= List of Slovenian writers =

This is a list of Slovenian writers. Names are in English alphabetical order. Information not on a person's page needs a reference.

- Vera Albreht (1895–1971)
- Gabriela Babnik (born 1979)
- Vladimir Bartol (1903–1967)
- Aleš Berger (born 1946)
- Cvetka Bevc (born 1960)
- France Bevk (1890–1970)
- Berta Bojetu (1946–1997)
- Ivan Cankar (1876–1918)
- Aleš Čar (born 1971)
- Dušan Čater (born 1968)
- Tone Čufar (1905–1942)
- Jurij Dalmatin (c. 1547–1589)
- Milan Dekleva (born 1946)
- Emil Filipčič (born 1951)
- Fran Saleški Finžgar (1871–1962)
- Jasmin B. Frelih (born 1986)
- Nejc Gazvoda (born 1985)
- Iztok Geister (born 1945)
- Tadej Golob (born 1967)
- Branko Gradišnik (born 1951)
- Andrej Hieng (1925–2000)
- Zoran Hočevar (born 1944)
- Jurij Hudolin (born 1973)
- Anton Ingolič (1907–1992)
- Jeannette Ipavec Čampa (1817–1911)
- Janez Jalen (1891–1966)
- Drago Jančar (born 1948)
- Miran Jarc (1900–1942)
- Mirko Javornik (1909–1986)
- Jože Javoršek (1920–1990)
- Simon Jenko (1835–1869)
- Vida Jeraj (1860–1932)
- Josip Jurčič (1844–1881)
- Alma Karlin (1889–1950)
- Irena Kazazić (born 1972)
- Janko Kersnik (1852–1897)
- Edvard Kocbek (1904–1981)
- Ciril Kosmač (1910–1980)
- Miroslav Košuta (1936–2026)
- Lojze Kovačič (1928–2004)
- Kajetan Kovič (1931–2014)
- Lado Kralj (1938–2022)
- Miško Kranjec (1908–1983)
- Maruša Krese (1947–2013)
- Julius Kugy (1858–1944)
- Mojca Kumerdej (born 1964)
- Lovro Kuhar (1893–1950), pseudonym of Prežihov Voranc
- Zofka Kveder (1978–2026)
- Feri Lainšček (born 1959)
- Vesna Lemaić (born 1981)
- Fran Levstik (1831–1887)
- Anton Tomaž Linhart (1756–1795)
- Florjan Lipuš (born 1937)
- Bogomir Magajna (1904–1963)
- Svetlana Makarovič (born 1939)
- Vitan Mal (born 1946)
- Katarina Marinčič (born 1968)
- Neža Maurer (1930–2025)
- Karel Mauser (1918–1977)
- Miha Mazzini (born 1961)
- Andrej Medved (1947–2026)
- Mira Mihelič (1912–1985)
- Marija Mijot (1902–1994)
- Miloš Mikeln (1930–2014)
- Vinko Möderndorfer (born 1958)
- Marica Nadlišek Bartol (1867–1940)
- Lela B. Njatin (born 1963)
- Josip Osti (1945–2021)
- Boris Pahor (1913–2022)
- Rudolf Pečjak (1891–1940)
- Vid Pečjak (1929–2016)
- Tone Polda (1917–1945)
- Krista Povirk (1938–2004)
- Janko Prunk (born 1942)
- Alojz Rebula (1924–2018)
- Miha Remec (1928–2020)
- Josip Ribičič (1886–1969)
- Pavla Rovan (1908–1999)
- Marjan Rožanc (1930–1990)
- Franček Rudolf (born 1944)
- Dimitrij Rupel (born 1946)
- Marija Rus (1921–2019)
- Tomaž Šalamun (1941–2014)
- Anka Salmič (1902–1969)
- Dušan Šarotar (born 1968)
- Rudi Šeligo (1935–2004)
- Igor Škamperle (born 1962)
- Selma Skenderović (born 2001)
- Andrej E. Skubic (born 1967)
- Angelca Škufca (1932–2020)
- Dominik Smole (1929–1992)
- Jože Snoj (1934–2021)
- Ljubka Šorli (1910–1993)
- Janez J. Švajncer (born 1948)
- Ivan Tavčar (1851–1923)
- Zora Tavčar (born 1928)
- Igor Torkar (1913–2004)
- Janez Trdina (1830–1905)
- Primož Trubar (1508–1586)
- Josipina Turnograjska (1833–1854)
- Josip Vandot (1884–1944)
- Milan Vidmar (1885–1962)
- Valentin Vodnik (1758–1819)
- Goran Vojnović (born 1980)
- Prežihov Voranc (1893–1950)
- Vlado Žabot (born 1958)
- Dane Zajc (1929–2005)
- Zdenka Žebre (born 1920)
- Irena Žerjal (born 1940)
- Ciril Zlobec (1925–2018)
- Vitomil Zupan (1914–1987)
- Katka Zupančič (1889–1967)
- Oton Župančič (1878–1949)

== See also ==
- Slovenian literature
- List of Slovenian women writers
- List of Slovenian language poets
- List of Slovenian writers and poets in Hungary
