= List of Slovenian women writers =

This is a list of women writers who were born in Slovenia or whose writings are closely associated with that country.

== A ==
- Vera Albreht (1895–1971), poet, children's writer, translator

== B ==
- Gabriela Babnik (born 1979), novelist, critic, translator
- Mária Bajzek Lukács (born 1960), Hungarian-born Slovene-language writer, educator, editor, translator
- Cvetka Bevc (born 1960), poet, prose writer, children's writer, playwright
- Berta Bojetu (1946–1997), poet, novelist
- Kristina Brenk (1911–2009), children's writer, poet, translator

== C ==
- Anica Černej (1900–1944), poet, children's writer

== D ==
- Elvira Dolinar (1870–1961), journalist, novelist, feminist

== G ==
- Alenka Goljevšček (1933–2017), playwright, young adult writer, essayist
- Berta Golob (born 1932), children's writer, poet
- Eliza Frančiška Grizold (1847–1913), teacher, poet, and composer

== H ==
- Milka Hartman (1902–1997), poet

== I ==
- Jeannette Ipavec Čampa (1817–1911), poet

== J ==
- Vida Jeraj (1860–1932), poet.

== K ==
- Alma Karlin (1889–1950), travel writer, poet, novelist, writing mainly in German
- Jana Kolarič (born 1954), poet, playwright, novelist and translator.
- Barbara Korun (born 1963), leading contemporary poet
- Tita Kovač Artemis (1930–2016), biographer, novelist
- Taja Kramberger (born 1970), poet, essayist, translator
- Maruša Krese (1947–2013), poet, short story writer, journalist
- Mojca Kumerdej (born 1964), short story writer, novelist, critic
- Meta Kušar (born 1952), poet, essayist
- Zofka Kveder (1878–1926), early Slovene-language woman writer, short story writer, playwright, journalist, feminist

== L ==
- Vesna Lemaić (born 1981), short story writer, novelist
- Cvetka Lipuš (born 1966), Austrian-born Slovene-language poet

== M ==
- Svetlana Makarovič (born 1939), acclaimed poet, children's writer, actress
- Katarina Marinčič (born 1968), novelist, short story writer
- Neža Maurer (1930–2025), poet, children's and young adults' writer
- Mira Mihelič (1912–1985), novelist, translator
- Marija Mijot (1902–1994), seamstress, dialectal poet and playwright
- Jana Milčinski (1920–2007), novelist, children's writer, journalist, translator

== N ==
- Marica Nadlišek Bartol (1867–1940), essayist, short story writer, editor
- Lela B. Njatin (born 1953), novelist, artist
- Lili Novy (1885–1958), acclaimed poet, poetry translator

== P ==
- Pavlina Pajk (1854–1901), novelist, essayist, biographer, feminist
- Krista Povirk (1938–2004), catechist, poet, choir director
- Alenka Puhar (born 1945), biographer, non-fiction writer, journalist, translator
- Benka Pulko (born 1967), photographer, travel writer, children's writer, journalist

== R ==
- Marija Rus (1921–2019), Romance philologist, professor of French, translator, poet

== S ==
- Anka Salmič (1902–1969), farmer, folk healer and poet
- Ifigenija Zagoričnik Simonović, poet, essayist, children's writer
- Simona Škrabec (born 1968), critic, columnist, essayist, translator, writing mainly in Spanish and Catalan
- Breda Smolnikar (born 1941), novelist, young adults writer
- Angelca Škufca (1932 –2020), farmer and folk writer
- Ljubka Šorli (1910-1993), teacher, writer, poet and anti-fascist
- Katja Špur (1908–1991), poet, columnist, children's writer
- Anja Štefan (born 1969), children's writer, poet
- Marija Šuštar (1905–1989), ethnochoreologist and folklorist

== T ==
- Zora Tavčar (born 1928), poet, short story writer, essayist, translator
- Josipina Turnograjska, pen name of Josipina Urbančič, (1833–1854), early Slovene-language letter writer, short story writer

== V ==
- Saša Vegri (1934–2010), poet, young adults writer
- Maja Vidmar (born 1961), poet
- Angela Vode (1892–1985), feminist writer, autobiographer
- Marija Vojskovič (1915–1997), short story writer, children's writer
- Erika Vouk (born 1941), poet, translator

== Z ==
- Zdenka Žebre (1920–2011), novelist, children's writer, autobiographical works about Africa
- Irena Žerjal (1940–2018), poet, novelist, translator
- Bina Štampe Žmavc (born 1951), poet, playwright, children's writer
- Svetlana Žuchová (born 1976), novelist, short story writer, translator
- Katka Zupančič (1889–1967), children's poet, short story writer, playwright

== See also ==
- List of women writers
- List of Slovenian writers
