= List of Slovene-language poets =

Poets who wrote or write much of their poetry in Slovene.

Fran Albreht (1889–1965)
Vera Albreht (1895–1971)
Anton Aškerc (1856–1912)
France Balantič (1921–1943)
Nevin Birsa (1947–2003)
Matej Bor (1913–1993)
Ivan Cankar (1876–1918)
Anica Černej (1900–1944)
Aleš Debeljak (1961–2016)
Karel Destovnik (1922–1944)
Julka Gantar Fortuna (1916–1999)
Pavel Golia (1887–1959)
Alojz Gradnik (1882–1968)
Niko Grafenauer (born 1940)
Simon Gregorčič (1844–1906)
Eliza Frančiška Grizold (1847–1913)
Igo Gruden (1893–1948)
Paula Gruden (1921–2014)
Olga Haring (1866–1943)
Ivan Hribovšek (1923–1945)
Jeannette Ipavec Čampa (1817–1911)
Miran Jarc (1900–1942)
Urban Jarnik (1784–1844)
Jože Javoršek (1920–1990)
Simon Jenko (1835–1869)
Vida Jeraj (1860–1932)
Janoš Kardoš (1801–1875)
Dragotin Kette (1876–1899)
Mile Klopčič (1905–1984)
Edvard Kocbek (1904–1981)
Srečko Kosovel (1904–1926)
Taja Kramberger (born 1970)
Meta Kušar (born 1952)
Fran Levstik (1831–1887)
Rudolf Maister (1874–1934)
Svetlana Makarovič (born 1939)
Karel Mauser (1918–1977)
Janez Menart (1929–2004)
Marija Mijot (1902–1994)
Ivan Minatti (1924–2012)
Josip Murn (1879–1901)
Anton Novačan (1887–1951)
Josip Osti (1945–2021)
Iztok Osojnik (born 1951)
Lili Novy (1885–1958)
Odon Peterka (1925–1945)
Anton Podbevšek (1898–1981)
Tone Polda (1917–1945)
Krista Povirk (1938–2004)
France Prešeren (1800–1849)
Franček Rudolf (born 1944)
Marija Rus (1921–2019)
Tomaž Šalamun (born 1941)
Anka Salmič (1902–1969)
Jakob Savinšek (1922–1961)
Tone Seliškar (1900–1969)
Jože Šerjak (1918–1945)
Selma Skenderović (2001–)
Anton Martin Slomšek (1800–1862)
Jože Snoj (born 1934)
Jožef Stefan (1835–1893)
Aleš Šteger (born 1973)
Josip Stritar (1836–1923)
Gregor Strniša (1929–1987)
Ljubka Šorli (1910–1993)
Vladimir Truhlar (1919–1977)
Josipina Turnograjska (1833–1854)
Janez Vesel (1798–1884)
Anton Vodnik (1901–1965)
France Vodnik (1903–1986)
Valentin Vodnik (1758–1819)
Stanko Vraz (1810–1851)
Dane Zajc (1929–2005)
Katka Zupančič (1889–1967)
Oton Župančič (1878–1949)

== See also ==
- List of Slovenian writers
- Slovenian literature
- List of Slovenian writers and poets in Hungary
- List of Slovenes
- List of poets
