= Pečjak =

Pečjak is a Slovenian surname. Notable people with the surname include:

- Rudolf Pečjak (1891–1940), Slovenian writer
- Sebastijan Pečjak (1976–2012), Slovenian darts player
- Vid Pečjak (1929–2016), Slovenian psychologist
