= Fabula Award =

Slovenian literary award

Fabula is a literary award in Slovenia awarded each year for the best collection of short prose in Slovene published in the previous two years. It has been bestowed since 2006 by the national newspaper house Dnevnik at the Fabula World Literatures festival that takes place every spring in Ljubljana. The winner also receives a financial award.

| Year | Author | Title | Title in English | Publisher | Year of publication |
|---|---|---|---|---|---|
| 2006 | Nejc Gazvoda | Vevericam nič ne uide | Nothing Escapes the Squirrels | Goga | 2004 |
| 2007 | Katarina Marinčič | O treh | About the Three | Mladinska Knjiga | 2005 |
| 2008 | Maruša Krese | Vsi moji božiči | All My Christmases | Mladinska Knjiga | 2006 |
| 2009 | Peter Rezman | Skok iz kože | Leaping from Skin | Litera | 2008 |
| 2010 | Vesna Lemaić | Popularne zgodbe | Popular Stories | Cankarjeva Založba | 2008 |
| 2011 | Lado Kralj | Kosec koso brusi | The Reaper Sharpening his Scythe | Beletrina | 2010 |
| 2012 | Dušan Čater | Džehenem | Jahannam | Beletrina | 2010 |
| 2013 | not bestowed | - | - | - | - |
