= Dedni Dol =

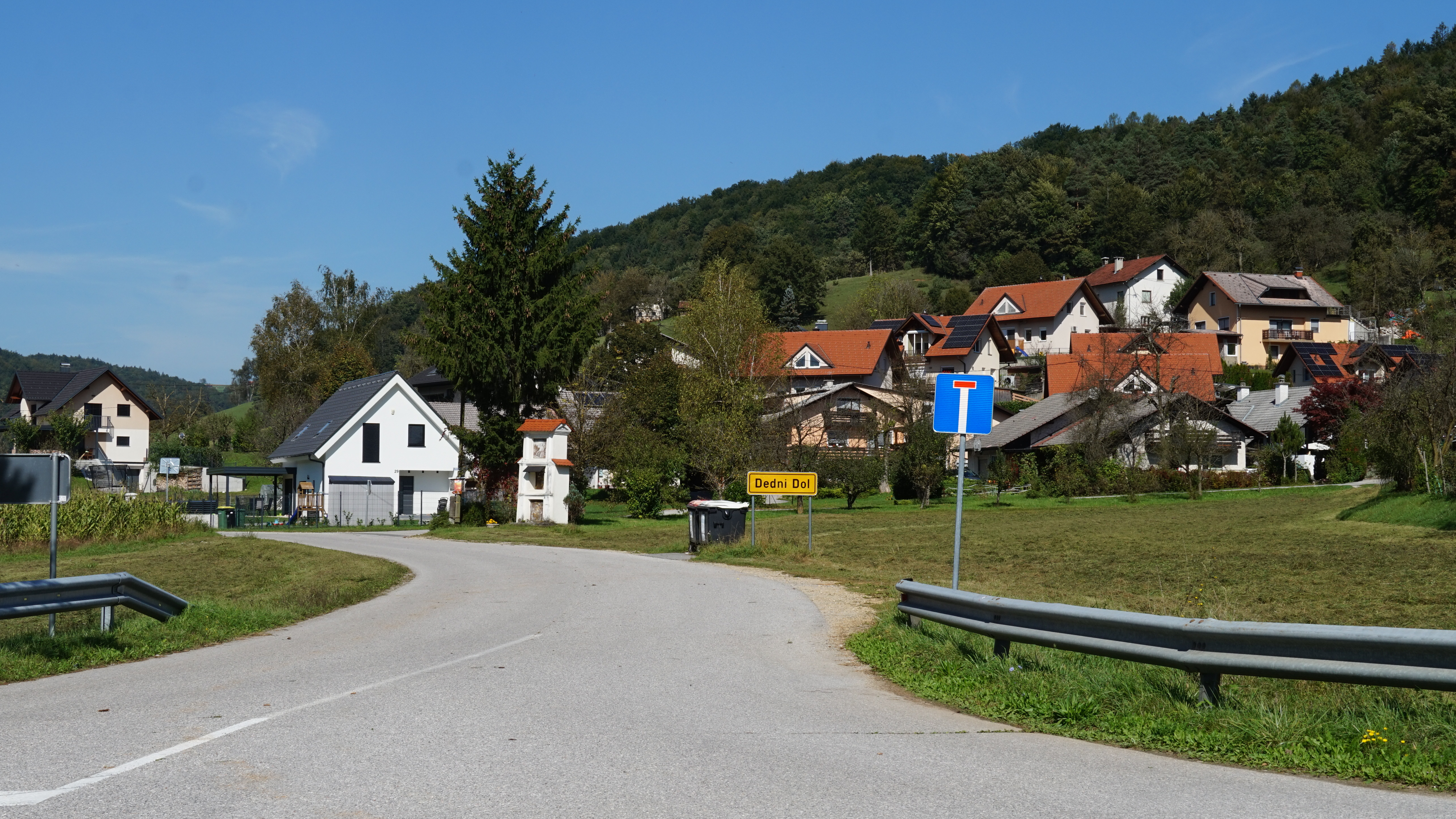
- Dedni Dol, Slovenia

- Location in Slovenia
- Coordinates: 45°58′0.98″N 14°44′3.55″E
- Country: Slovenia
- Traditional region: Lower Carniola
- Statistical region: Central Slovenia
- Municipality: Ivančna Gorica

Area
  - Total: 2.13 km^{2} (0.82 sq mi)
- Elevation: 378.4 m (1,241 ft)

Population (2002)
  - Total: 134

Dedni Dol (pronounced [ˈdeːdni ˈdɔu̯]; German: Dedendol) is a settlement northwest of Višnja Gora in the Municipality of Ivančna Gorica in central Slovenia. The area is part of the historical region of Lower Carniola. The municipality is now included in the Central Slovenia Statistical Region.

The local church is dedicated to Our Lady of Sorrows (Slovene: Cerkev Žalostne Matere božje) and belongs to the Parish of Višnja Gora. It dates to the 15th century with 18th-, 19th-, and 20th-century adaptations.

== Notable people ==
- Angelca Škufca (1932–2020), Slovenian farmer and folk writer
