= Filio ni doma =

1990 novel by Berta Bojetu

- Author: Berta Bojetu
- Language: Slovenian
- Publication date: 1990
- Publication place: Slovenia

Filio ni doma is a novel by Slovenian author Berta Bojetu. It was first published in 1990.

== Plot ==
The novel is divided into three parts, each telling the story of one of the main characters: Helena Brass, her granddaughter Filio, and Uri. However, the three stories are inseparably connected, so that by the end, the reader pieces together a complete narrative.

The story takes place on an unnamed island, which creates a sense that it could exist here and now. Only through the names of some characters (Mare, Kate, Lukrija, etc.) can we imagine a Dalmatian island—something literary historians have also suggested, identifying it with the island of Mljet. The author knew the island well and is said to have found the inspiration for the novel’s setting there, since in Roman times, the island served as a penal colony.

After a shipwreck, forty-two-year-old Helena Brass finds herself on the island together with her unnamed daughter and a boy she names Uri. Helena slowly becomes acquainted with life on the island and its strange, cruel rules. Men and women live separately—the women in the Upper Town and the men in the Lower Town—and each has specific duties. The women wear traditional clothing, wash clothes, and care for food and children, while the men work in vineyards, in the fish market, or as fishermen.

From the very beginning, the subordinate position of women is evident. They have no decision-making rights, no sense of community as in “normal” societies, and disobedient women are subjected to torture and brutal punishment, including sodomitic rape. The women are portrayed as mere “wombs” for childbearing, as men come to them every evening—each time a different man, according to a strict schedule. Reproduction is thus systematically organized, and even forced abortions are permitted.

Daughters may stay with their mothers, sharing the same fate as all women, while sons are taken away at the age of eight and brought to the Lower Town, where they are prepared for their future roles and work. All of this ensures the “proper” functioning of the island, which is owned by a man from the mainland. His orders are carried out by the Commander of the island.

Helena, as an outsider, struggles to adapt to a life governed by rules that deprive her of freedom and dignity. Nevertheless, she tries to make things better: she encourages the women to clean their homes together, open a laundry, and even start a school. These acts of defiance lead to punishment, but she is protected by the Commander, who is also her lover.

Helena’s daughter gives birth to Filio but shows no interest in her, so Helena raises the child herself. She also takes care of Uri, who is later taken to the Lower Town and trained to become the next manager of the island—a role that deeply troubles him, as he witnesses the cruelty around him. His only source of comfort is Filio, for whom he develops deep feelings. When Filio reaches sexual maturity, he visits her at night. Although she does not know who he is, she grows attached to him and eventually submits to life on the island.

However, when Filio becomes pregnant, the pregnancy is forcibly terminated. Traumatized, she decides to escape to the mainland. Uri remains behind but eventually follows her after becoming the island’s administrator. On the mainland, Filio builds a new life as a painter, holding exhibitions and eventually reuniting with Uri.

She returns to the island only when Helena falls ill, burying her after her death. By then, Filio is strong enough to confront her past and the memories it holds. The island itself begins to change as well—its rules loosen, and more and more people choose to leave it behind.

== See also ==
- List of Slovenian novels
