= Spodnje Brezovo =

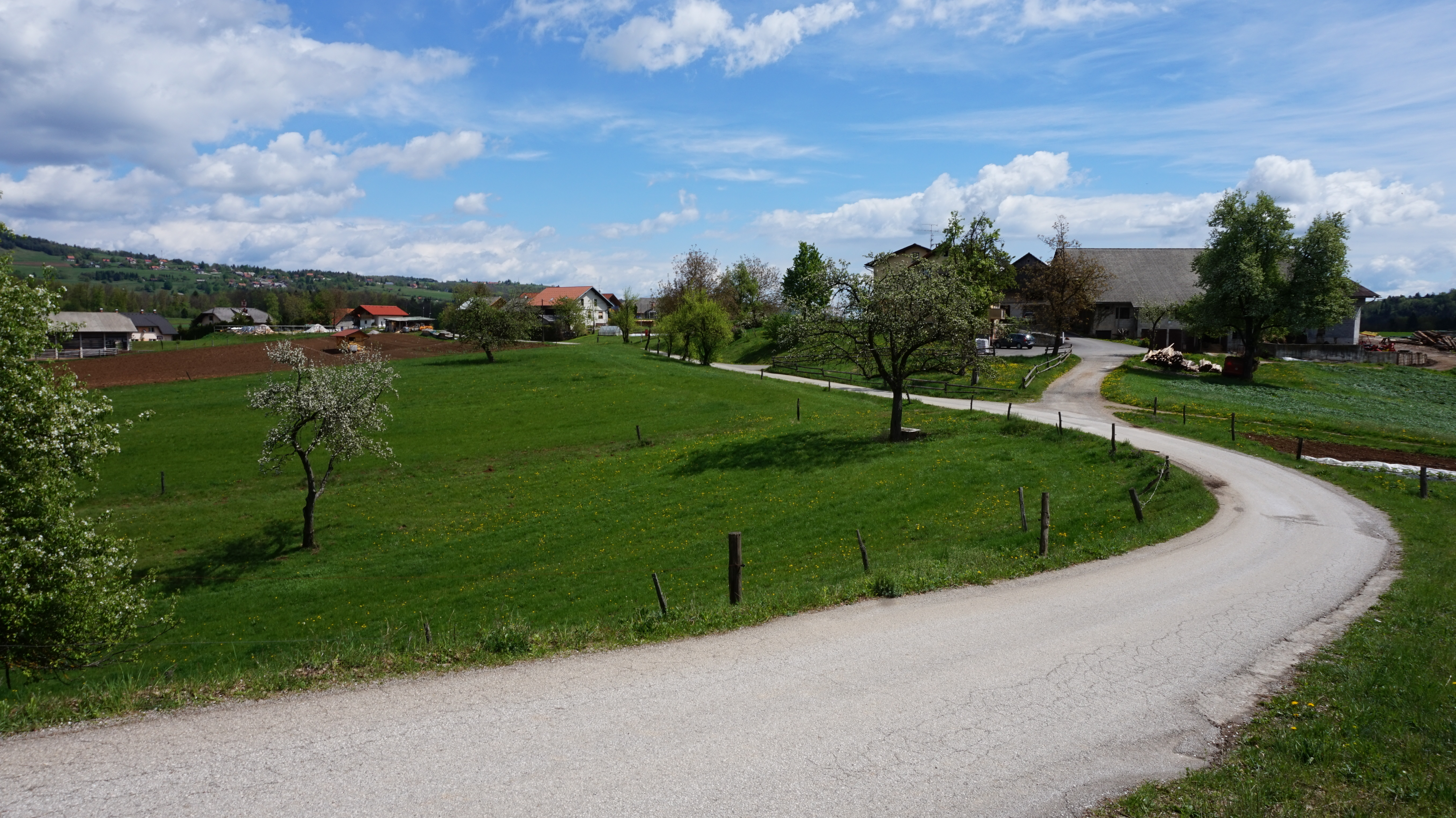

- Location in Slovenia
- Coordinates: 45°57′38.2″N 14°43′15.35″E
- Country: Slovenia
- Traditional region: Lower Carniola
- Statistical region: Central Slovenia
- Municipality: Ivančna Gorica

Area
  - Total: 2.2 km^{2} (0.85 sq mi)
- Elevation: 457.8 m (1,502 ft)

Population (2002)
  - Total: 135

Spodnje Brezovo (pronounced [ˈspoːdnjɛ ˈbɾeːzɔʋɔ]; German: Unterbresow) is a village west of Višnja Gora in the Municipality of Ivančna Gorica in central Slovenia. The area is part of the historical region of Lower Carniola and is included in the Central Slovenia Statistical Region.

== Notable people ==
- Angelca Škufca (1932–2020), Slovenian farmer and folk writer
