= Se spominjaš Afrike? =

2003 novel by Zdenka Žebre

- Author: Zdenka Žebre
- Language: Slovenian
- Publication date: 2003
- Publication place: Slovenia

Se spominjaš Afrike? (Do You Remember Africa?) is a novel by Slovenian author Zdenka Žebre. It was first published in 2003.

== See also ==
- List of Slovenian novels
