= Peter Rezman =

Slovene poet, writer and playwright (born 1956)

- Born: 21 October 1956; Celje, Socialist Federal Republic of Yugoslavia (now in Slovenia)
- Occupations: Poet, writer, playwright
- Writing career
- Notable works: Skok iz kože, Nujni deleži ozimnice, Tekoči trak
- Notable awards: Fabula Award; 2009 Skok iz kože

Peter Rezman (born 21 October 1956) is a Slovene poet, writer and playwright. He lives and works in Plešivec near Velenje in northern Slovenia.

Rezman was born in Celje in 1968. He worked as an electrician at the Velenje lignite mining|mine and has been active in local cultural and ecological societies. He has been publishing poetry since the mid-1980s and has also written several collections of short stories and theatre plays. In 2009 he was awarded the Fabula Award for best collection of short prose in Slovene published within the previous two years for his short story volume Skok iz kože (Leaping from Skin).

== Poetry ==
- Pesmi iz premoga (Poetry from Coal), (1985)
- Delavske pesmi (Worker's Poems), (1988)
- Črno in črno, rdeče in rdeče, zeleno in zeleno (Black and Black, Red and Red, Green and Green), (1991)
- Družmirje (1998)

== Prose ==
- Kiril Lajš ni lastnik krčme Peter Rezman (Kiril Lajš is Not the Owner of Peter Rezman Inn), short stories, (1985)
- Skok iz kože (Leaping from Skin), short stories, (2008)
- Pristanek na kukavičje jajce (Landing on the Cuckoo's Egg), novel, (2010)
- Nujni deleži ozimnice (Compulsory Shares of Winter Stockpile), short stories, (2010)
- "Tekoči trak", novel, (2015)
- "Mesto na vodi", novel, (2019)
