= Zagorice, Bled =

Former settlement in Bled, Slovenia

Zagorice
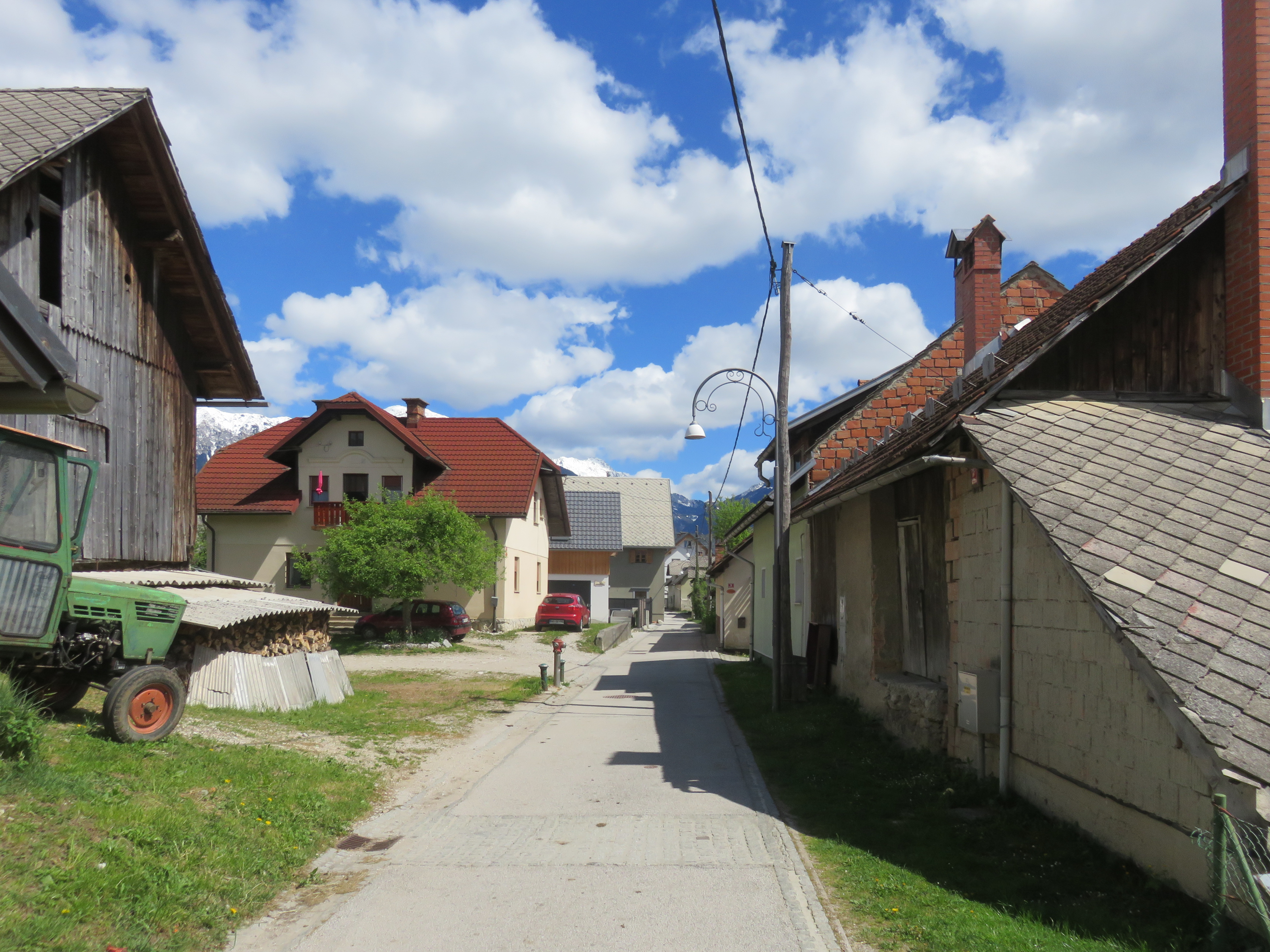

- Location in Slovenia
- Coordinates: 46°22′02″N 14°06′47″E
- Country: Slovenia
- Traditional Region: Upper Carniola
- Statistical region: Upper Carniola
- Municipality: Bled
- Elevation: 495 m (1,624 ft)

Zagorice (pronounced [zaɡɔˈɾiːcɛ], also Zagorica and formerly Bled–Zagorice; German: Auriz or Auritz) is a former settlement in the Municipality of Bled in northwestern Slovenia. It is now part of the town of Bled. The area is part of the traditional region of Upper Carniola and is now included with the rest of the municipality in the Upper Carniola Statistical Region.

== Geography ==
Zagorice lies in the southern part of Bled, above the eastern shore of Lake Bled. Roads to Spodnje Gorje, Koritno, and Ribno branch off from Zagorice.

== Name ==
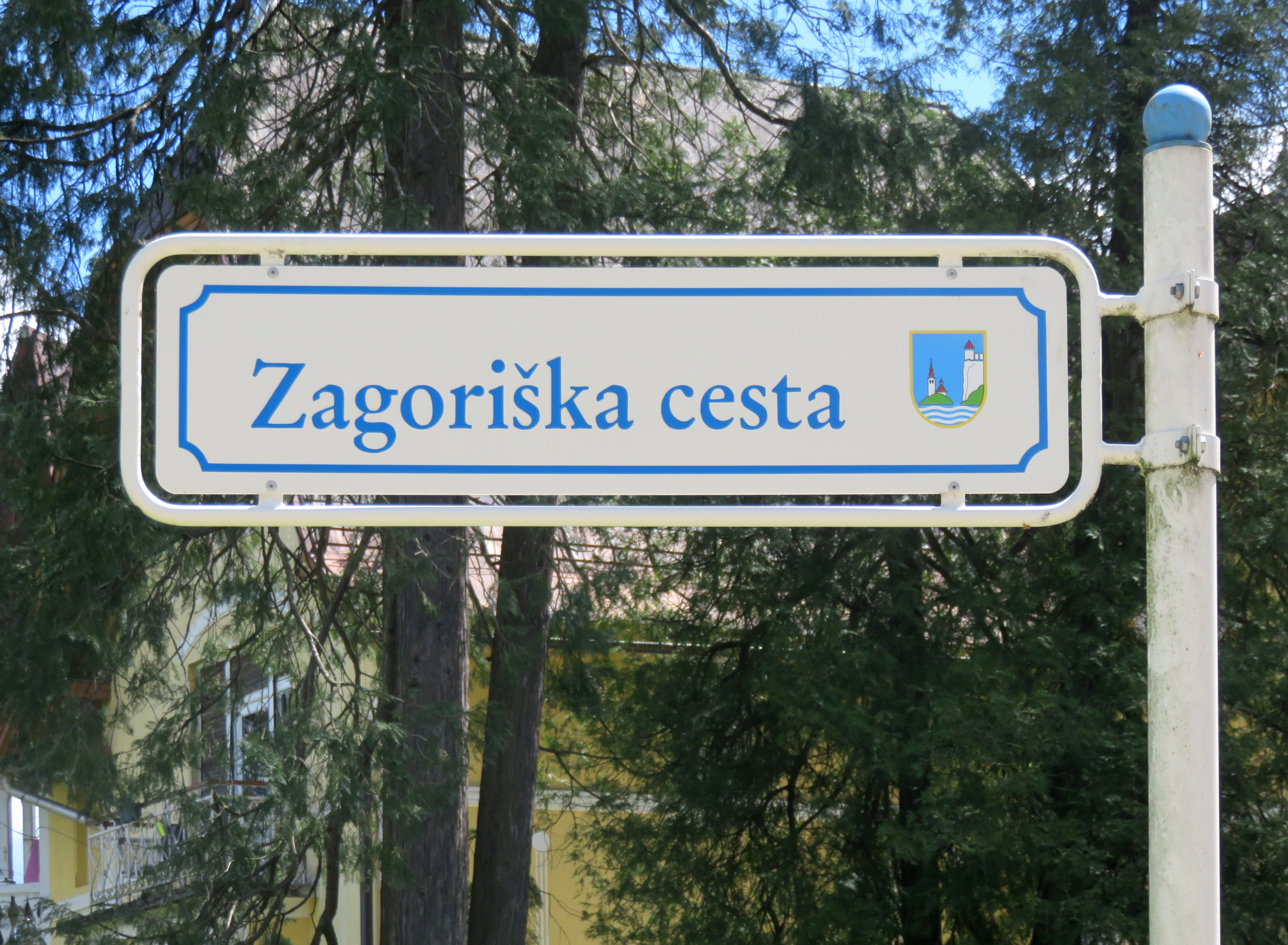
A sign for Zagoriška cesta (Zagorice Street)

Zagorice (a plural name) was attested in written sources as Aulatsch in 1253, Anraze in 1287, and Auratsch between 1306 and 1309, among other spellings, as well as Sagoritz between 1493 and 1501. The name also often appears in the singular form, Zagorica. After the Second World War, it was also known as Bled–Zagorice.

== History ==
Zagorice had a population of 235 living in 39 houses in 1869, 253 in 40 houses in 1880, 275 in 40 houses in 1890, 321 in 56 houses in 1900, and 479 in 113 houses in 1931. Zagorice was merged with other villages to create the town of Bled in 1960, ending its existence as a separate settlement.

== Notable people ==
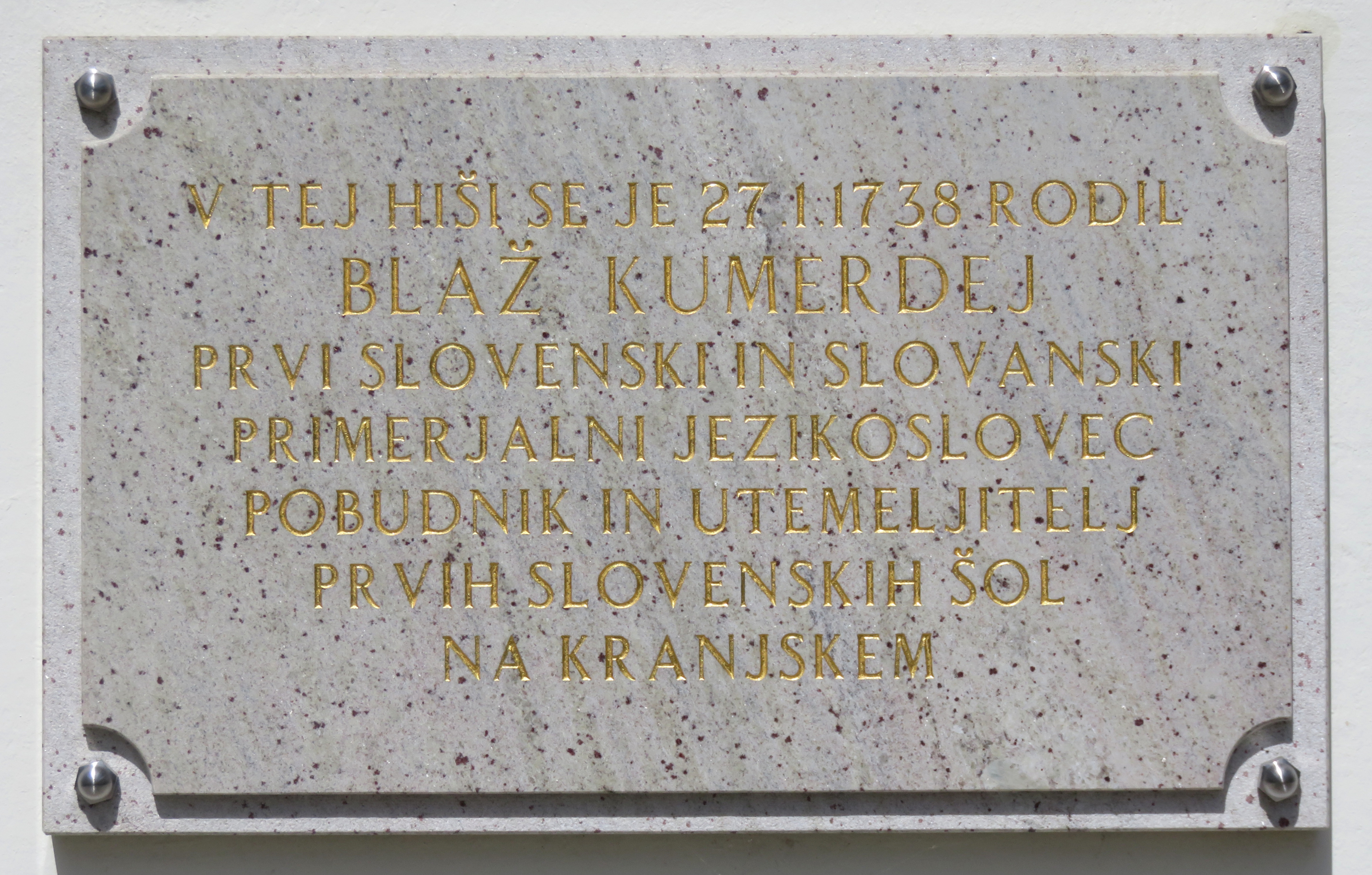
Plaque at the birthplace of Blaž Kumerdej in Zagorice

Notable people that were born or lived in Zagorice include the following:

- Vida Jeraj (1865–1932), poet and lyricist
- Blaž Kumerdej (1738–1805), philologist
- Matej Pretner (1858–1944), lawyer
