= Podreča =

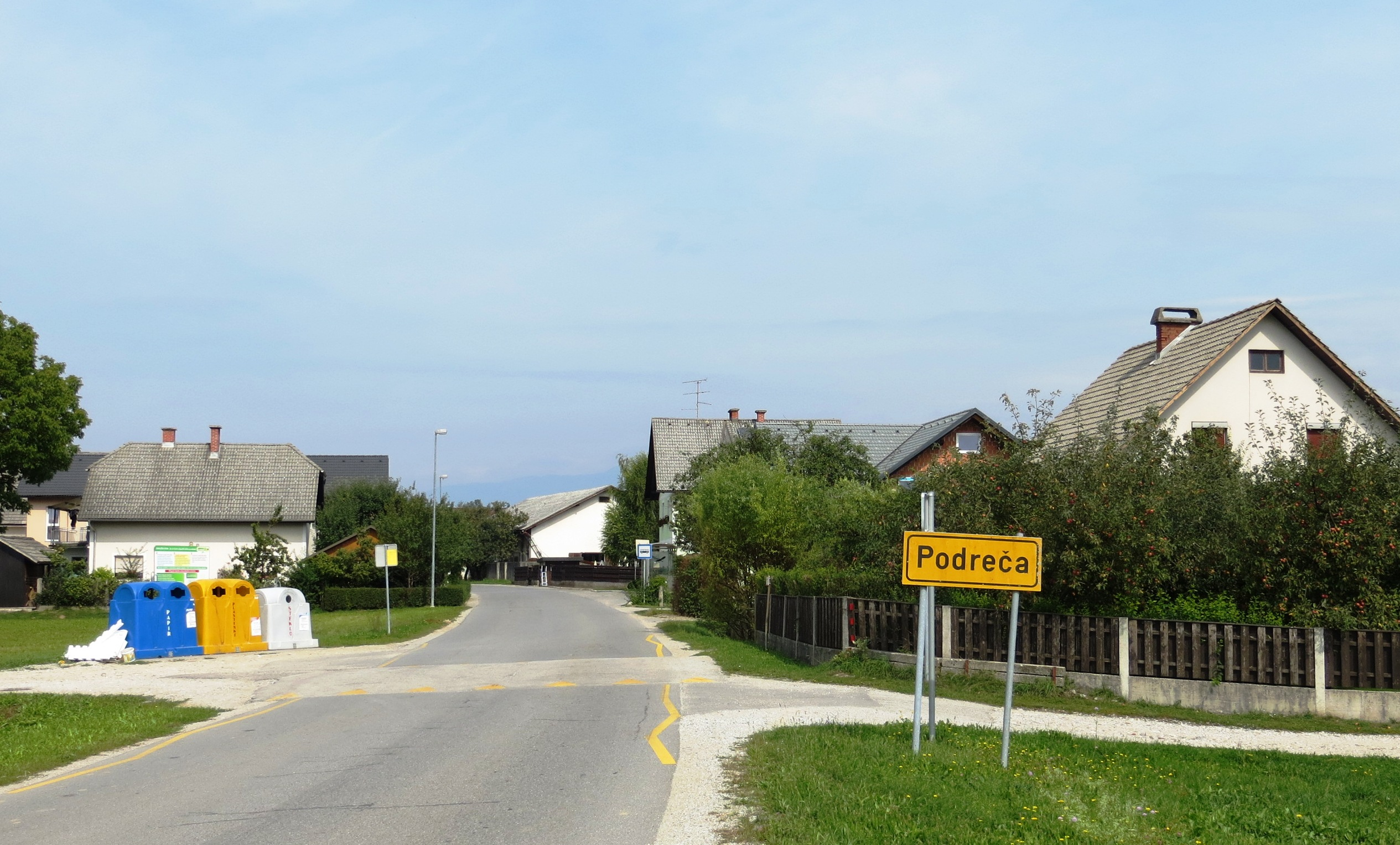

- Location in Slovenia
- Coordinates: 46°10′22.61″N 14°24′36.27″E
- Country: Slovenia
- Traditional region: Upper Carniola
- Statistical region: Upper Carniola
- Municipality: Kranj

Area
  - Total: 3.35 km^{2} (1.29 sq mi)
- Elevation: 356 m (1,168 ft)

Population (2002)
  - Total: 446

Podreča (pronounced [pɔˈdɾeːtʃa]; in older sources also Podreče, German: Podretsche) is a village on the right bank of the Sava River in the Municipality of Kranj in the Upper Carniola region of Slovenia.

== Name ==
Podreča was attested in written sources in 1334 as Patriarchsdorf, and in 1437 as de Patriarchali villa. The name is derived from *Podreča (vas) (literally, 'patriarch's village'); the first element is a possessive adjective from the noun podreka 'patriarch'. In the Middle Ages the village was a property of the Patriarchate of Aquileia, and so the name refers to historical ownership. A small rise near the settlement known as Abbot's Hill (Slovene: Opatji hrib) is also reminiscent of this ecclesiastical heritage.

== History ==
In 1929 a monument was set up behind the church, marking the former site of the house where the Slovene poet and writer Simon Jenko (1835–1869) was born. There were formerly a sawmill and grain mill in the village, but these sites were flooded when the Sava River was dammed for the Medvode hydroelectric plant in 1953, raising the water level by 5 meters (16 ft).

== Church ==
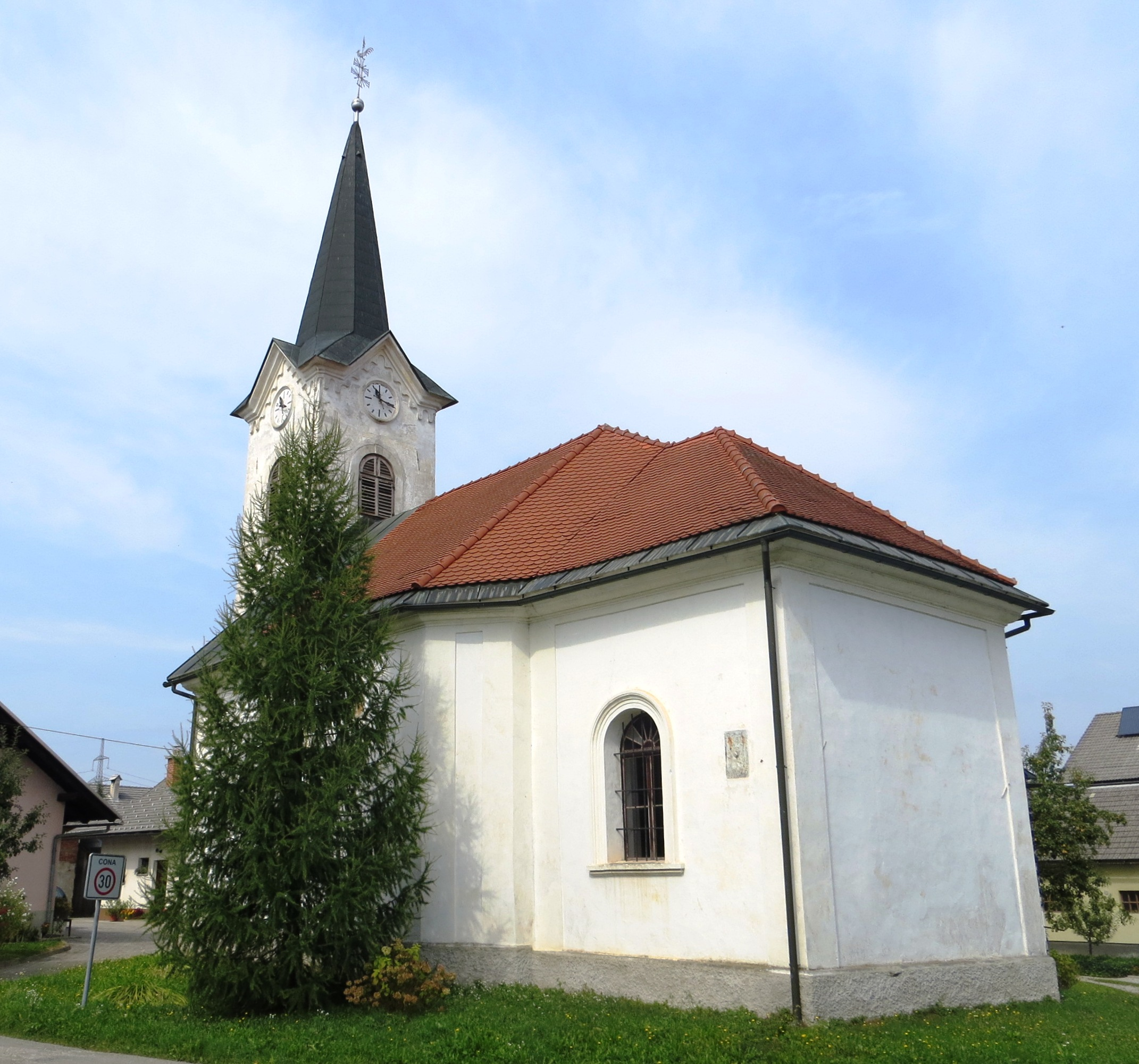
Church in Podreča

The local church is dedicated to Saints Cantius, Cantianus, and Cantianilla. It dates from 1854 and was restored after the 1895 Ljubljana earthquake. The church contains an altar created by one of the Goetzls in 1874.

== Notable people ==
Notable people that were born or lived in Podreča include:

- Simon Jenko (1835–1869), poet and writer
