= Gorenja Vas pri Leskovcu =

- Location in Slovenia
- Coordinates: 45°55′21.96″N 15°27′31.39″E
- Country: Slovenia
- Traditional region: Lower Carniola
- Statistical region: Lower Sava
- Municipality: Krško

Area
  - Total: 0.76 km^{2} (0.29 sq mi)
- Elevation: 162.5 m (533 ft)

Population (2002)
  - Total: 136

Gorenja Vas pri Leskovcu (pronounced [ɡɔˈɾeːnja ˈʋaːs pɾi lɛˈskoːu̯tsu]; Slovene: Gorenja vas pri Leskovcu, German: Oberdorf) is a village southwest of Leskovec in the Municipality of Krško in eastern Slovenia. The area is part of the traditional region of Lower Carniola. It is now included with the rest of the municipality in the Lower Sava Statistical Region.

== Name ==
Gorenja Vas pri Leskovcu was attested in historical sources as Oberndorf in 1445.

== Cultural heritage ==
A number of Roman graves have been found in the area, indicating the western extent of the nearby Neviodunum necropolis.

== Notable people ==
- Anka Salmič (1902–1969), Slovenian farmer, folk healer and poet
