= Josip Osti =

Bosnian writer (1945–2021)

Josip Osti (19 March 1945 – 26 June 2021) was a Bosnian and Slovenian poet, prose writer and essayist, literary critic, anthologist and translator.

== Biography ==
Osti was born in Sarajevo, Bosnia and Herzegovina. He graduated from the Faculty of Philosophy at the University of Sarajevo. He was the editor of the culture part of the student magazine Naši dani, editor at the publishing house Veselin Masleša, Secretary of the Literature Society of the City of Sarajevo and Director of the international literary festival Sarajevo Days of Poetry, Secretary of the Writers’ Association of Bosnia and Herzegovina, President of the Association of Literary Translators of Bosnia and Herzegovina and proof-reader/corrector of the publishing house Svjetlost.

Since 1990, Osti has been living in Slovenia, first in Ljubljana and then in the village of Tomaj in the Karst region, where he worked as a freelance writer.

Osti published some twenty-five books of poetry (last ten were written in Slovene), four books of prose, twelve books of essays, literary criticism and journalistic texts, as well as the book of conversations with Izet Sarajlić and the book of correspondence with Biljana Jovanović.

Osti edited and translated ten anthologies of Bosnian and Slovenian poetry and prose, and translated more than eighty books and fifteen plays by Slovenian authors. Some thirty translations of his books in Slovene, Italian, Czech, English, Polish, Turkish, Bulgarian and Macedonian have been published.

Osti won the Slovenian literary awards: Zlata ptica ("Golden Bird", 1993), Veronikina nagrada (Veronika Award, 1999), Župančičeva nagrada (Župančič Award, 2000) and Jenkova nagrada (Jenko Award, 2006), as well as the Vilenica International Literary Prize (1994), the special international poetry award Scritture di Frontiera (Trieste, 2005), and the PONT international literary prize for intercultural cooperation (2019).
