= Minka Krofta =

Slovene activist and publisher

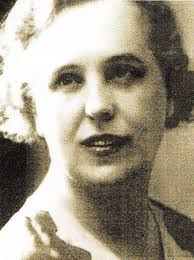
- Minka Krofta
- Born: September 3, 1888; Ljubljana, Slovenia
- Died: September 15, 1954 (aged 66)

Minka Krofta (1888–1954) was a Slovenian feminist, publisher, and literary patron. She is noted for being the president of Založba Belo-modra knjižnica, the first women's publishing house in Slovenia. Krofta advanced the welfare of children, young people, and women. She also promoted literacy and physical education.

== Biography ==
Krofta was born to a notable family in Ljubljana on September 3, 1888. Her father, Ivan Jelačin was a wholesaler while her mother, Maria, was one of the founding members of the Slovenian General Women's Association, the first Slovene feminist group. She married the banker Hanuš Krofta. Her social status allowed her to become an active member of Slovene society just like her mother.

In 1927, the Založba belo-modra knjižnica (the White and Blue Library) publishing house was established and she became its editor and president until its closure in 1941. An account cited that she accepted her role with the arrangement that the publication will focus on women's literature. Its sport and culture society called TKD also established a fairy tale section, which contributed to the professionalism of authors, schools, and literary institutions by developing literary materials for children and young adults. Under Krofta, the publication also became more ambitious and introduced new sections that included works of literature by Slovenian female authors. One of the notable works published was Zofka Kveder's collected works.

== Activism ==
Krofta led a group of intellectuals in narrating fairy tales to a young audience. This circle of female authors included Dora Gruden, Marija Jezernik, Manica Koman, Marijana Kokalj Željeznov, Marija Grošelj, and Ruža Lucija Petelin. This initiative led to the publication of the first Slovene picture book.

Krofta was also active in promoting women's rights. Založba belo-modra knjižnica established the magazine Housewife (Gospodinja) on her recommendation. By 1935, Krofta was recorded as a member of the Yugoslav Women's Association for the Drava Banovina. A year later, she delivered a lecture on rural women at the Congress of the International Women's Association in Dubrovnik. She also joined Anica Gogala on the financial commission of the Yugoslav Women's Association.
