= Vida Jeraj Hribar =

Slovenian violinist (1902–2002)

- Born: May 4, 1902; Vienna, Austria-Hungary
- Died: May 6, 2002 (aged 100); Ljubljana, Slovenia
- Occupations: Violinist and music teacher

Vida Jeraj Hribar (4 May 1902 – 6 May 2002) was a Slovenian violinist and music teacher who was named Slovene Woman of the Year in 1992 after publishing a book of her memoirs at the age of 91.

Jeraj was born in Vienna in 1902. Her father was also a violinist and her mother was the writer Vida Jeraj. The family moved to Ljubljana in 1919 where she continued her musical studies and later also taught at the Musical Society Conservatorium and became the headmistress of the newly established Ljubljana Music and Ballet Secondary School in 1953.

At the age of 91 she published a book of memoirs entitled Večerna sonata: spomini z Dunaja, Pariza in Ljubljane, 1902–1933 (Evening Sonata: Memoirs of Vienna, Paris and Ljubljana, 1902–1933) for which she was awarded the Levstik Award in 1993.

She died two days after her 100th birthday.

She was married to the philosopher Mirko Hribar, and was the sister-in-law of Ksenija Hribar, whose fate was depicted in Drago Jančar's novel That Night I Saw Her.
