= Pavlina Pajk =

Slovenian poet and writer (1854–1901)

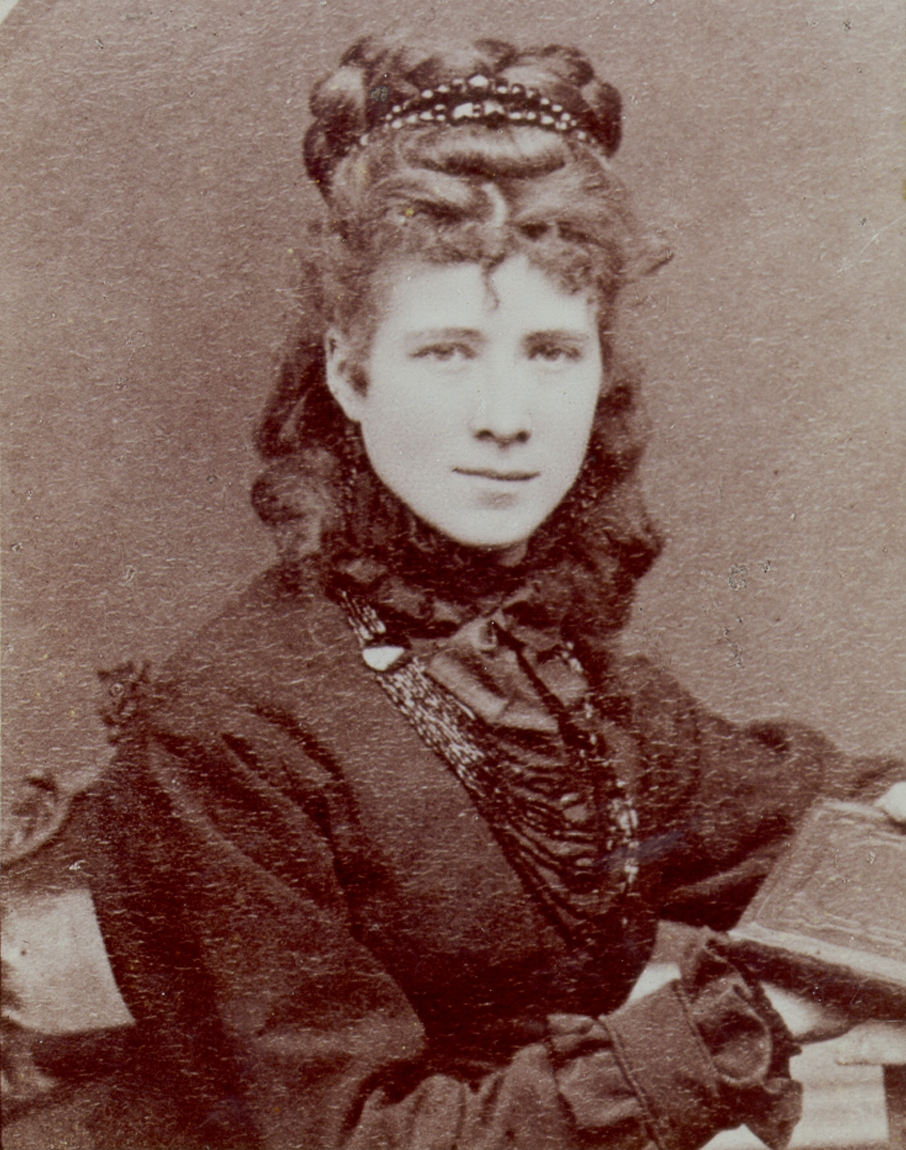
Pavlina Pajk

Pavlina Pajk, née Doljak (9 April 1854 – 1 June 1901) was an early Slovene poet, novelist, essay writer and biographer.

== Biography ==
Born in Pavia, then part of the Austrian Empire, Pajk's parents were Slovenes. The area came under Italian control when she was about five, and her family remained there. She first received an Italian education but after her parents had died, when she was 16 she moved to stay with her uncle in Solkan, Slovenia. She published her first collection of poems, Prva Ljibezen (First Love) in 1873. When she was 22, she fell in love with Janko Pajk, a Slovenian professor and editor. They arranged the wedding before they even met (through letters) and when they got married they moved first to Maribor then to Austria where she lived for the next 20 years. She wrote for Slovenian papers while living in Austria. She had a son named Milan and when he got a teaching job in Ljubljana Pavlina and her husband moved to Ljubljana where Pavlina Pajk died in 1901.

While her poetry was acclaimed by the critics, her prose works, which included six novels, were said to be less successful. In 1876, she also wrote an extensive obituary of George Sand, and went on to write other shorter obituaries. In 1893 and 1895 a two part collection of her works was published. In 1884, she wrote an article advocating the elementary schooling of women of all social classes.

== Works ==
- Odlomki iz ženskega dnevnika (1876)
- Roka in srce (1881)
- Blagodejna zvezdica (1881)
- Mačeha (1882)
- Pripovestnik v sili (1883)
- Očetov tovariš (1884)
- Arabela (1885)
- Dora (1885)
- Domačija nad vse (1889)
- Najgotovejša dota (1892)
- Prijateljev sin (1894)
- Obljuba (1894)
- Najdenec (1894)
- Planinska idila (1895)
- Roman starega samca (1895)
- Igra s srečo (1895)
- Spomini tete Klare (1895)
- Dušne borbe (1896)
- Judita(1896)
- Slučaji usode (1897)
- Življenja križi (1903)
