= Lela B. Njatin =

Slovene writer and visual artist

- Born: 1963 (age 62–63)
- Occupations: writer and visual artist
- Writing career
- Notable work: Nestrpnost

Lela B. Njatin (born 1963) is a Slovene writer and visual artist. She is best known for her novel Nestrpnost (Intolerance) and her conceptual art installations.

== Biography ==
B. Njatin was born in Ljubljana in 1963. She studied Comparative literature and Philosophy at the University of Ljubljana. Most of her career she is a self-employed writer and artist. She also worked as an editor and a public relations consultant. She mostly writes short stories that have been published in several anthologies at home and abroad. Her 1988 novel Nestrpnost (Intolerance) won her critical acclaim and has been reprinted and also translated into Croatian (Croatian title Netrpeljivost). Her fairy tale Velikanovo srce (The Giant’s Heart) was nominated for the Večernica Award and has also been translated into Czech (Czech title Obrovo srce) and Croatian (Croatian title Divovo srce). Her work has also been was published in several anthologies abroad, including: Schnellstrasse, Fernlicht/Hitra cesta, ostra luč, Kovič, Grafenauer, Šalamun, Jančar, B. Njatin (Droschlverlag in Mladinska knjiga, Graz - Ljubljana 1990); The Day Tito Died, Jančar, Gradišnik, Virk, B. Njatin, Blatnik (Forrest Books, London 1993); The Third Shore, Women's Fiction from East Central Europe, anthology of ten authors (Northwestern University Press, Evanston 2005). Outstanding is her contribution to a monograph on Antony Gormley (E. H. Gombrich, J. Hutchinson, W. J. T. Mitchell, L. B. Njatin, Phaidon Press, London 1995, revis. ed. 2000). In the field of visual arts she works as a conceptual artist and explores the relation between literature and art. She started by writing conceptual poetry in the 1970s. Mostly she creates mixed-media art installations, among them I didn’t want to know, but I have since come to know (Muzeum, Ljubljana 2005) and Absence, Hommage à Igor Zabel (Museum of Modern Art, Ljubljana, 2007). In 2016, the Museum of Contemporary Art in Zagreb presented a retrospective of her works Subversive Body. Conceptual works 1977-2015. In 2021, Gallery Miklova hiša Ribnica and Pilon’s gallery Ajdovščina presented her work from 2005-2020 with an exhibition and a monograph publication Because We Are Not Just Images, We Are People. 2005 – 2020. She has also notably contributed to the graphic arts in Slovenia. In 2022, her work One must rely on Art was selected for the contemporary production overview exhibition Prints and Impressions II, and in 2005 her work With the left hand was included in the retrospective exhibition Avant-garde and alternative prints in Slovenia from conceptualism to the present day, both at MGLC-International Centre of Graphic Arts, Ljubljana.

== Published works ==
- Rošlin in Verjanko (IRošlin and Verjanko), 1987
- Nestrpnost (Intolerance), 1988, reprinted 1991 & 2018
- Začasno bivališče (Temporary Residence), 1990
- Velikanovo srce (The Giant's Heart), 1997
- Zakaj je babica jezna (Why Granny is Angry), 2011
- Lokalitetno v identiteti (Local Contents of Identity), 2020
- Smer srca (The Direction of the Heart), 2022
- Samski blok (The House of Solitude), 2022

== Performed works ==
- short film What to do, B. Njatin (production of ŠKUC, Ljubljana and AUZO, Kočevje-Maribor) based on the original screenplay by co-authors B. Njatin, Ravnikar, Oražem, 1981
- feature-length video-film Intolerance (directed by Neven Korda, produced by TV Slovenija and Brut Film, Ljubljana) based on motifs from B. Njatin’s novel Intolerance, 1991
- theatre performance The Manifestations of Home (directed by Barbara Novakovič, produced by MGL-City Theatre of Ljubljana and Zavod Muzeum, Ljubljana) based on motifs from B. Njatin’s short story The Sky over Ljubljana, 2004
- theatre miniature I didn't want to know, but I have since learned to know (directed by Lela B. Njatin, produced by Zavod Muzeum, Ljubljana) based on the original script by B. Njatin, 2005
- short film Girl with a Flute (directed by Jure Bradeško, produced by CZMK, Kočevje) based on B. Njatin’s fairy tale Girl with a Flute, 2018
- the video-cartoon The Giant and the Little Fish (produced by Gallery Miklova hiša Ribnica) based on the original script by B. Njatin, 2019
