= Emil Filipčič =

Slovene writer, playwright and actor

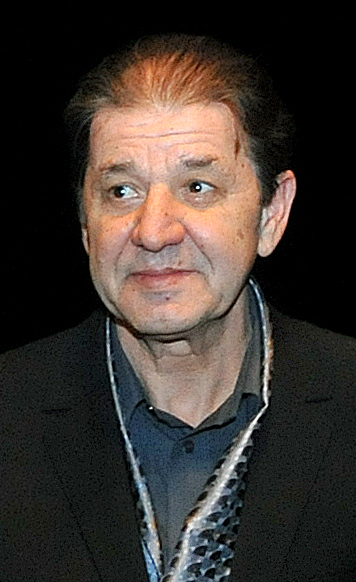
- Emil Filipčič in 2011
- Born: 8 April 1951 (age 75); Belgrade, Socialist Federal Republic of Yugoslavia (now in Serbia)
- Occupations: Writer, playwright, actor
- Writing career
- Notable works: Keopsova piramida, Problemi
- Notable awards: Prešeren Foundation Award; 2011 for Problemi

Emil Filipčič (born 8 April 1951) is a Slovene writer, playwright and actor. He is known for his novels, short stories and dramas and has also appeared as an actor in numerous theatre productions in Slovenia.

Filipčič was born in Belgrade in 1951. He studied at the Academy for Theatre, Radio, Film and Television in Ljubljana and works as a freelance writer, actor, playwright and director. In 2011, he won the Prešeren Foundation Award for his novel Problemi (Problems).

== Selected works ==
- Grein Vaun, novel, (1979)
- Kerubini (Cherubins), satirical novel co-written with Branko Gradišnik under the single pseudonym Jožef Paganel
- Kuku, novel, (1985)
- Ervin kralj, novel, (1986)
- X-100, novel, (1988)
- Orangutan, short stories (1992)
- Dobri robotek, short stories (1993)
- Urugvaj 1930, novel, (1993)
- Jesen je, novel, (1995)
- Izlet v naravo, short stories (1997)
- Keopsova piramida, novel, (2005)
- Problemi, novel, (2009)

== Plays ==
- Kegler, drama (1981)
- Ujetniki svobode, drama (1982)
- Altamira, satirical comedy (1982)
- Bolna nevesta, satirical comedy (1984)
- Kako naj odgovorim spoštovanemu tovarišu Francetu Piberniku?, drama (1985)
- Atlantida, drama (1988)
- Božanska tragedija, drama (1989)
- Psiha, comedy (1993)
- Veselja dom, drama (1996)
