= Lado Kralj =

Slovene writer and critic (1938–2022)

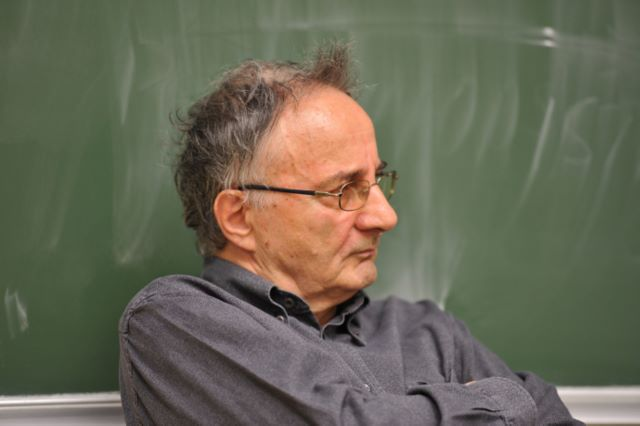
- Kralj in 2010
- Born: 27 March 1938; Slovenj Gradec, Kingdom of Yugoslavia (now in Slovenia)
- Died: 12 December 2022 (aged 84)
- Occupations: Writer, theatre critic, literary critic
- Writing career
- Notable works: Kosec koso brusi (The Scyther Grinds the Scythe); Ne bom se več drsal na bajerju (I Will No Longer Skate on the Pond)
- Notable awards: Fabula Award; 2011 Kosec koso brusi Kresnik Award; 2023 Ne bom se več drsal na bajerju

Lado Kralj (27 March 1938 – 12 December 2022) was a Slovene writer, theatre critic and literary historian. From 1987 to 2005 he worked as a professor in comparative literature at the University of Ljubljana. He published and contributed to numerous books on literature and theatre.

Kralj was born in Slovenj Gradec in northern Drava Banovina (today Slovenia) in 1938. He studied comparative and English literature at the University of Ljubljana where he also got his PhD in 1986. He attended postgraduate study at New York University (1970–1971) and co-founded an experimental theatre group upon his return to Ljubljana. Between 1978 and 1982 he was also artistic director at the Slovene National Theatre in Ljubljana. He worked as a lecturer at the University in Ljubljana until his retirement in 2005.

In 2010 he published his literary debut Kosec koso brusi (The Scyther Grinds the Scythe), which won him the Best Debut Novel Award awarded by the Union of Slovenian Publishers and Booksellers as well as the 2011 Fabula Award for best collection of short prose in Slovene published within the previous two years. In 2023 he was nominated for the annual Cankar Award.

Kralj died on 12 December 2022, aged 84. In June 2023, his novel Ne bom se več drsal na bajerju (I Will No Longer Skate on the Pond) was awarded the Kresnik prize, the most prestigious prize for novels in Slovenia. The novel takes place in Ljubljana during the Italian occupation in the early 1940s and in the post-war period in the 1950s. It focuses on the Šiška District of Ljubljana, where a young man working for the Communists falls in love with a student at the monastery boarding school, a woman who is also the love interest of an Italian officer.

== Published works ==
- Ekspresionizem (Expressionism), monograph, (1986)
- Teorija drame (The Theory of Drama), (1998)
- Primerjalni članki (Comparative Articles), (2006)
- Kosec koso brusi (The Reaper Sharpening His Scythe), short stories, (2010)
- Ne bom se več drsal na bajerju (I Will No Longer Skate on the Pond), novel, (2022)
