= Marica Nadlišek Bartol =

Slovenian writer and editor (1867–1940)

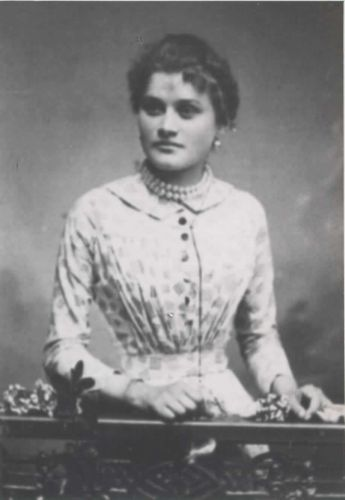
- Born: Marica Nadlišek; 10 February 1867; Trieste, Austrian Empire
- Died: 3 January 1940 (aged 72); Ljubljana, Kingdom of Yugoslavia
- Occupation: Teacher, writer, editor
- Language: Slovene
- Spouse: Gregor Bartol
- Children: 7, including Vladimir Bartol

Marica Nadlišek Bartol (February 10, 1867 – January 3, 1940) was a Slovenian writer and editor. From 1897 to 1899, she served as founding editor of the influential women's journal Slovenka.

Forced to flee her home city of Trieste in 1919 after the Italian takeover, she settled in Ljubljana and resumed her Slovenian nationalist and feminist writing and activism, which had been cut short by her marriage two decades earlier.

== Early life and education ==
Marica Nadlišek was born in Trieste, in what was then the Austrian Empire, in 1867. Her father was a middle-class land surveyor who was active in the Slovenian community of Trieste.

In 1882, she enrolled in a teacher's college in Gorizia; teaching was one of the few professions available to Slovenian women at the time. While at school in Gorizia, she became interested in Slovenian literature and entered the world of Slovenian intelligentsia. After graduating in 1886, she returned to the Trieste area and became a teacher in Slovenian schools in the city's suburbs.

== Literary career ==
While she worked as a teacher, Nadlišek became involved in the Trieste literary scene, writing opinion articles and short fiction. Her first essay, emphasizing the role of women in encouraging Slovenian nationalism, appeared in the newspaper Edinost in 1888. The following year, she published her first short story, titled "Moja prijateljica" ("My Female Friend"), in the periodical Ljubljanski zvon. She would become one of the first women to regularly contribute to the publication, while also writing for other Slovenian publications, including Domači prijatelj.

She wrote a novel, Fatamorgana ("Mirage"), in 1898, though it would not be published in book form until a century later, in 1998. It is considered the first Slovenian Trieste novel.

Nadlišek co-founded and served as the first editor of the women's journal Slovenka, which ran from 1897 to 1902. The journal aimed to strengthen Slovenian national identity among women, promote the emancipation of Slovenian women, and support women's literary education. She served as editor from its founding until 1899, when she stepped down due to her marriage. In her time as editor, she published such writers as Vida Jeraj, Kristina Šuler, and Marica Strnad Cizerlj. As she spoke several languages, including Croatian, German, and Russian, she established herself as a translator in the pages of Slovenka, publishing translations of work by Mikhail Lermontov, Alexander Pushkin, Ivan Turgenev, and Heinrich Heine.

== Writing ==
Nadlišek Bartol's writing frequently featured strong Slovenian nationalist themes. She also wrote on feminist subjects, notably participating in a long dialogue with the Catholic religious leader Anton Mahnič in which she disputed his argument that men should be supreme and dominant in society. She was influenced by her deep appreciation for Russian realist literature. Her characters were notably different from those of her Slovenian female literary predecessors in that they were bourgeois and working-class, non-idealized women.

== Activism ==
In addition to writing on Slovenian nationalist and feminist subjects, Nadlišek Bartol was an influential activist in her community, serving as the central organizer of Slovenian women in Trieste at the turn of the century. While Nadlišek Bartol was politically moderate compared to those who would come after her, she held modern, liberal views, and some of her activities were viewed as radical at the time. She helped co-found the all-women local branch of the Society of Saints Cyril and Methodius, an educational organization, in 1887.

== Marriage and exile from Trieste ==
Nadlišek married the postal clerk Gregor Bartol in 1899 and had seven children with him between 1901 and 1909, two of whom died in early childhood. One of her children would go on to become the famous Slovenian writer Vladimir Bartol. Her marriage frustrated Nadlišek Bartol, as it cut short her career and activism.

After World War I, as the Italians took control of Trieste, she continued to secretly teach Slovene, causing the Carabinieri to frequently interrogate her. Her family was eventually forced to move to Ljubljana in September 1919, and she initially lived there in a train wagon with her five children.

Once she had settled into the city and managed to arrange for her family's basic survival, she began writing again and working as a translator. She contributed to the women's magazine Ženski svet, serving as its editor from 1931 to 1934, and both joined and co-founded women's rights organizations. She was also active in organizations fighting for the rights of Slovenians who remained in Italy.

Nadlišek Bartol began writing a memoir of her life, titled Iz mojega življenja, beginning in 1927. It was published posthumously in the literary journal Razgledi in 1948. She died in 1940 in Ljubljana, at age 72.
