= Svetlana Žuchová =

Slovak writer and translator (born 1976)

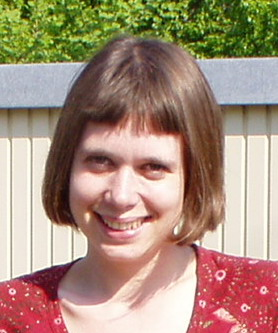
Photo of Svetlana Žuchová

Svetlana Žuchová (born December 1976) is a Slovak writer and translator. She has published a collection of short stories and three novels. Her first novel received the Ivan Krasko Prize. Her 2013 novel Obrazy zo života M. (Scenes from the Life of M.) won the EU Prize for Literature in 2015.

== Life ==
Žuchová is a Slovak writer and translator. She was born in Bratislava in December 1976, and her father Ivan Žuch is a psychiatrist and wrote literature, poems and essays. She was educated at Vienna University and Comenius University in Bratislava, studying medicine and psychology. She is a practising psychiatrist in a hospital in Germany.

== Works ==
As a short story writer, Žuchová has twice won prizes in the Slovak literary competition Poviedka. Her first collection of short stories Dulce de Leche appeared in 2003 and won the Ivan Krasko Prize. She has published three novels since then: Yesim (2006), Zlodeji a svedkovia (Thieves and Witnesses, 2011), and Obrazy zo života M. (Scenes from the Life of M., 2013). All three have made the shortlist for Anasoft Litera, Slovakia's most prestigious literary prize. In 2015, Obrazy zo života M. won Zuchova the EU Prize for Literature. The novel has been translated into Italian with the title Marisia. Frammenti di una vita by Tiziana D'Amico for Mimesis. Žuchová writes about themes such as displaced people, immigrant communities, and bereavement.

Žuchová's translations include works by Michel Faber, Sarah Kane, Sophie Kinsella and Sabine Thiesler. She has worked in Prague and Munich, and is married to an American physicist.
