= Simon Jenko =

Slovene poet

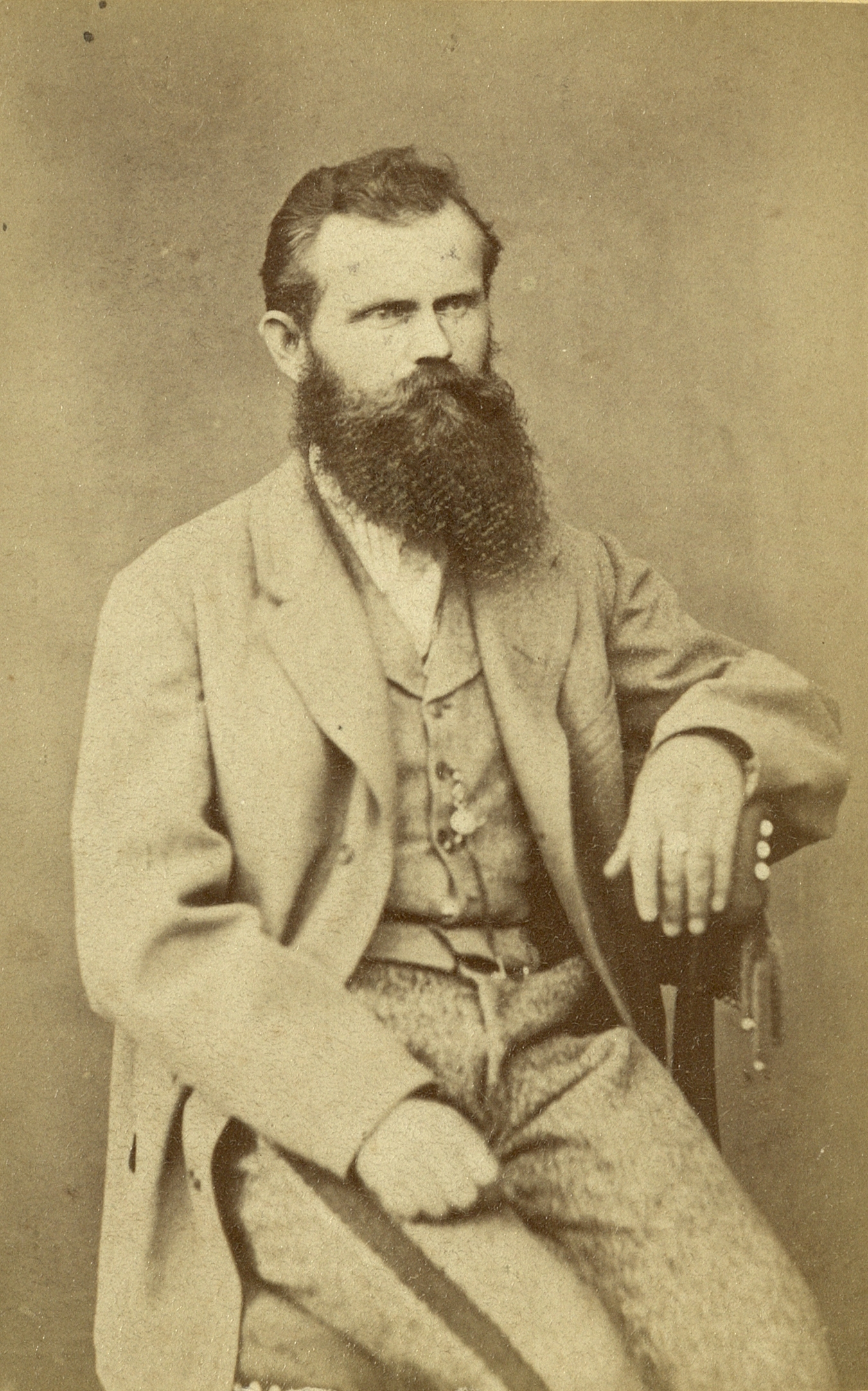
Simon Jenko.

Simon Jenko (October 27, 1835 – October 18, 1869) was a Slovene poet, lyricist and writer.

Jenko was born in Podreča in the Sora Plain (Sorško polje) in Upper Carniola, then part of the Austrian Empire, now in Slovenia, as an illegitimate son of poor peasant parents. Later he moved with his parents to Praše, which was the very inspiration for most of his poems and short stories. The local clergy enabled him to study in Novo Mesto, Klagenfurt, and Ljubljana. Contrary to their will, however, Jenko decided not to become a priest, but enrolled at the University of Vienna, where he studied law, classical philology, and history.

Together with Fran Levstik, Josip Jurčič, Josip Stritar, Simon Gregorčič, and Fran Erjavec, he belonged to the group of prominent Slovenes that embraced a progressive and nationalist political ideology (often with Pan-Slavic elements) and introduced literary realism in Slovenian literature. He mostly wrote lyrical and patriotic poems, which reveal an influence of late romanticism. He also wrote short prose in a realistic style.

He was the cousin of the composer Davorin Jenko. The two composed the song Naprej zastava slave together, which used to be the unofficial Slovenian national anthem up to the 1980s.

He died in Kranj.

The Jenko Award bestowed each year for the best poetry collection in Slovene published in the previous two years by the Slovene Writers' Association is named after Simon Jenko.

== See also ==
- List of Slovene-language poets
