= Vid Pečjak =

Slovene author and psychologist

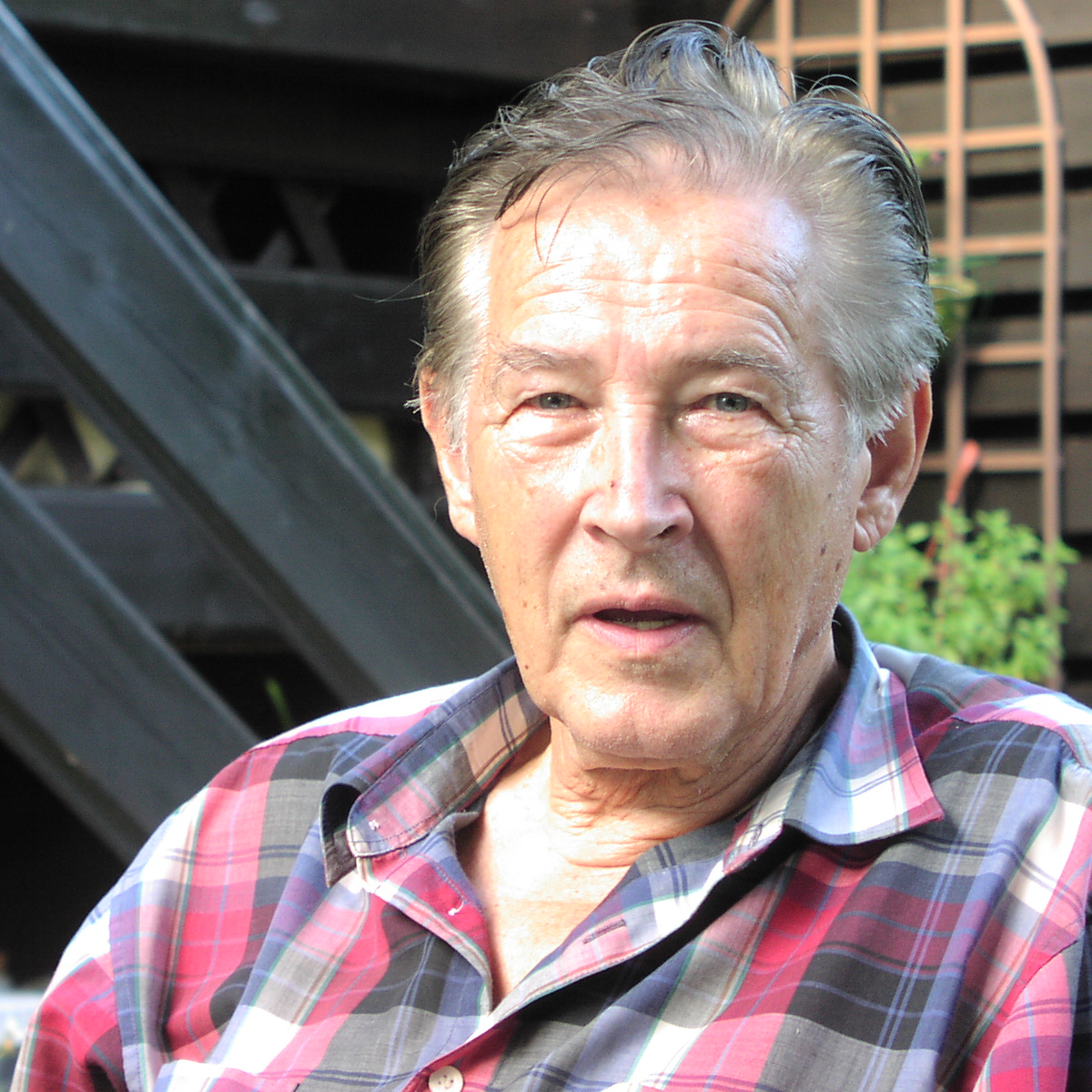
Vid Pečjak

Vid Pečjak (7 January 1929 – 27 February 2016) was a Slovene author and psychologist.

Pečjak was born in Ljubljana, Slovenia. His father was Rudolf Pečjak.

Vid Pečjak has written 90 books, two thirds in the field of psychology. Most of his literary works are science fiction stories, novels, novelettes and also travel diaries and comic strip. Some of his works were written under his pseudonym Div Kajčep (palindrome of his name).

Pečjak is perhaps best known for his SF novel for children and youth Drejček in trije marsovčki (Drejček and Three Little Martians) (1961), which concerns a little boy named Drejček (Andy) who meets three little Martians.
