= Maruša Krese =

Slovene poet, writer and journalist

- Born: 13 April 1947; Ljubljana, Socialist Federal Republic of Yugoslavia (now in Slovenia)
- Died: 7 January 2013 (aged 65); Ljubljana, Slovenia
- Occupations: Poet, writer, journalist
- Writing career
- Notable works: Vsi moji božiči, Vse moje vojne
- Notable awards: Fabula Award; 2008 Vsi moji božiči

Maruša Krese (13 April 1947 – 7 January 2013) was a Slovene poet, writer and journalist. Krese was born in Ljubljana in 1947. She studied literature and art history at the University of Ljubljana and psychodrama and Gestalt therapy in the United States in the early 1970s.

She worked as a group therapist in Ljubljana and Tübingen, and was a Slovene radio correspondent in Berlin in the early 1990s. From 1992 onward she worked as a freelance journalist and writer in Berlin.

In 1997, Krese was awarded the Order of Merit of the Federal Republic of Germany for her humanitarian efforts in the Bosnian War.

In 2008 she won the Fabula Award for best collection of short prose in Slovene published within the previous two years for her work Vsi moji božiči (All My Christmases).

== Prose ==
- Vsi moji božiči (All My Christmases), short stories, 2006
- Vse moje vojne (All My Wars), short stories, 2009
- Da me je strah? (That I Am Afraid?), novel, 2012

== Poetry ==
- Danes (Today), 1989
- Postaje (Stations), 1992
- Sarajevo, ljubavi moja (Sarajevo, My Love), 1994
- Beseda (The Word), 1994
- Selbst das Testament ging verloren (Even the Will Was Lost), 2001
- Yorkshire Tasche (Yorkshire Bag), 2003
- Heute nicht (Not Today), 2009
