= Vesna Lemaić =

Slovene writer from Ljubljana (born 1981)

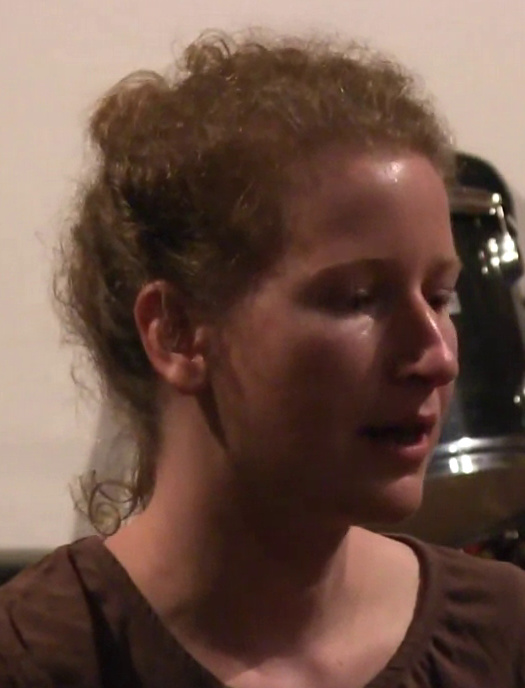
- Vesna Lemaić in 2015
- Born: 1981 (age 44–45)
- Occupation: writer
- Writing career
- Notable works: Popularne zgodbe, Odlagališče
- Notable awards: Fabula Award; 2010 Popularne zgodbe

Vesna Lemaić (born 1981) is a Slovene writer from Ljubljana.

== Biography ==
Vesna Lemaić is a writer from Slovenia. In 2008, she entered the literary scene with a highly acclaimed short stories collection Popular stories (Popularne zgodbe). The book won three awards for a short story collection in Slovene. In 2010, her first novel The Dumping ground (Odlagališče) was published.

Regarding short stories, story "The pool" (Bazen) was placed into short stories collection Best European fiction 2014. Her stories were published in literary periodicals Literatura, Sodobnost, Dialogi, etc. Her radio drama Underpassenger (Podpotnik) was produced by Slovene national radio Radio Slovenija.

Lemaić's literary works have been translated into several languages, among them Croatian, Serbian, Slovak, Hungarian, Lithuanian, German and English. She collaborates with ŠKUC Association in organizing annual international literary-musical festival Live literature that occurs every June in Ljubljana. In addition, she established reading club Anoymous readers and regularly carries out creative writing and group trash writing workshops.

Her activism focuses both on the LGBTQ community in Slovenia and on migration and volunteer work supporting refugees. These themes are reflected in her literary works.

== Literary works ==
- Popularne zgodbe (Popular stories), short stories collection (Cankarjeva Publishing House, 2008)
- Odlagališče (The Dumping ground), a novel (Cankarjeva Publishing House, 2010)

=== Short stories anthologies ===
- Best European Fiction 2014 (in English; ed. Drago Jančar; Illinois: Dalkey Archive Press, 2014)
- Razkriti obrazi svobode (Uncovered faces of freedom) (in Slovene; ed. Janina Kos; Ljubljana: Publishing House Beletrina, 2014)
- Nahliadnutia do súčasnej slovinskej prózy(Insight into current Slovene prose) (in Slovak; ur. Saša Vojtechová Poklač, Svetlana Kmecová; Bratislava: Univerzita Komenského, 2013).
- Kliči me po imenu(Call me by my name) (in Slovene; ed. Silvija Borovnik; Ljubljana: Študentska Publishing House, 2013)
- Pristojan život (Decent living) (in Serbian; ed. Dragoslava Barzut; Beograd: Labris, Rekonstrukcija ženski fond, 2012)

=== Other translations ===
- Popularne priče (Popular stories) (in Croatian; Zagreb: Centre for creative writing, 2014)

== Awards ==
- Fabula award for best short stories collection in two years´ time (2010)
- Golden bird award for emerging and promising author in the field of literature (2009)
- Slovene book fair award for best first novel of the year (2009)
- Radio Slovenia award for best short story (2008)
- international award Lapis Histriae for best short story (Croatia, 2009).
