= Selma Skenderović =

Slovene writer (born 2001)

- Born: 9 June 2001; Autonomous Province of Kosovo and Metohija, Federal Republic of Yugoslavia
- Occupations: writer; poet; slovenist

Selma Skenderović is Bosniak descent Slovene writer, poet, and slovenist.

== Life ==
She was born in present-day Kosovo. At the age of nine, she moved to Slovenia with her parents.

She is studying Slovene and comparative studies at the Faculty of Arts, University of Ljubljana. She publishes prose and poetry in various anthologies and other platforms.

In 2021, she published her first work of short prose Why Are You Silent, Hava? (Zakaj molčiš, Hava?) which has been translated into several languages (English, Montenegrin, Bosnian). It was translated into English by Andreja Šalamon Verbič. This book has been selected for the project Readers of Europe 2022.
