= Zofka Kveder =

Slovenian writer and editor (1878–1926)

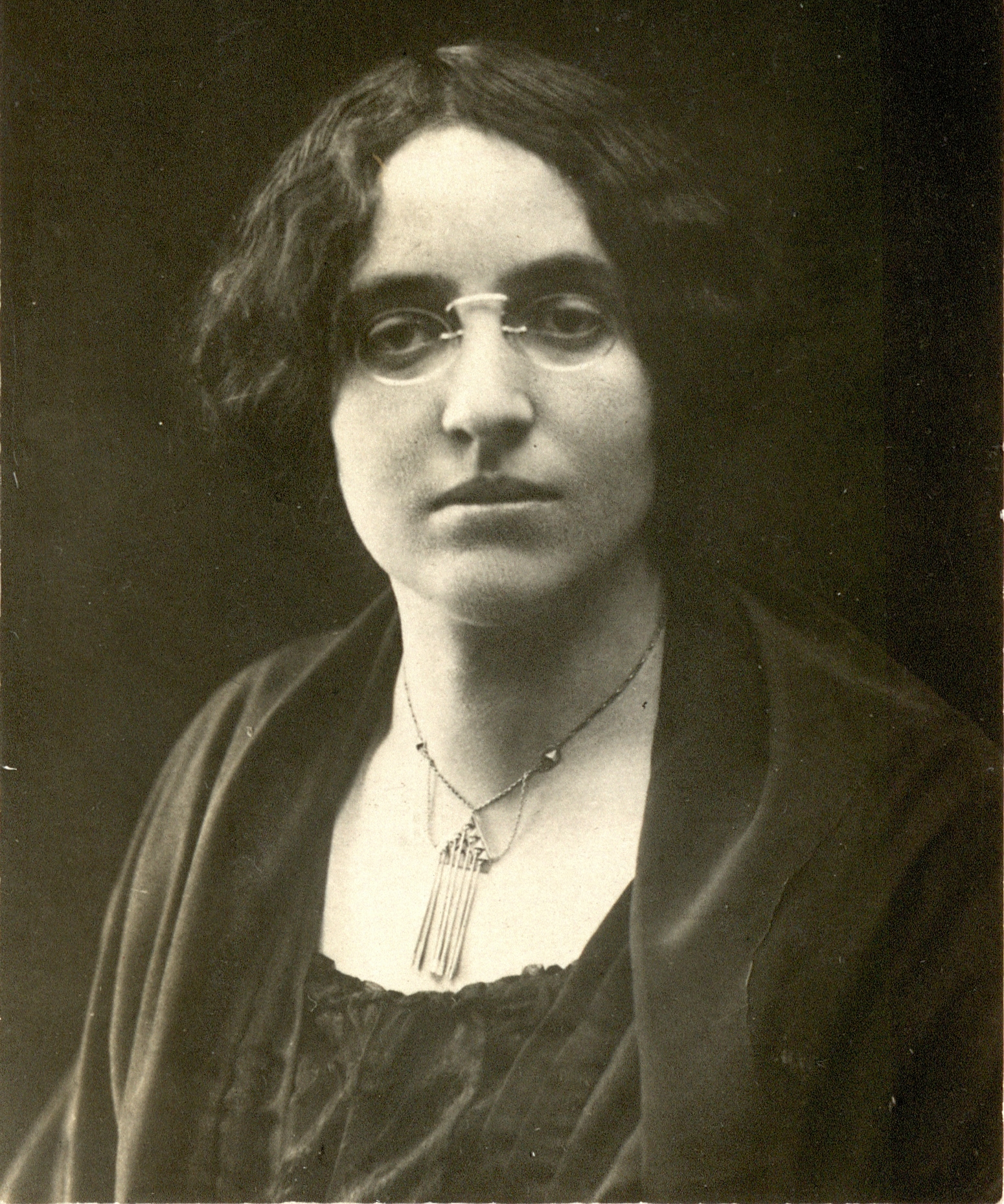
- Born: 22 April 1878; Ljubljana, Austria-Hungary (now Slovenia)
- Died: 21 November 1926 (aged 48); Zagreb
- Occupations: writer, playwright, journalist
- Writing career
- Notable works: Misterij žene, Odsevi, Njeno življenje, Iz naših krajev, Amerikanci

Zofka Kveder (22 April 1878 – 21 November 1926) was a writer, playwright, translator and journalist who wrote in Slovene, German and later in life also in Croatian. She is considered one of the first Slovene women writers and feminists.

Kveder was born in Ljubljana and spent most of her childhood in rural Lower Carniola before she was sent to a convent school in Ljubljana. In 1897 she found work in Ljubljana. In 1899 she first moved to Trieste and then to Bern where she enrolled in the university, but was unable to support herself financially and headed for Munich and then Prague. There she met her future husband Vladimir Jelovšek, a Croatian medical student with whom she moved to Zagreb in 1906. She later remarried to the Croatian politician Juraj Demetrović. In Prague she published her first book of short stories Misterij žene (The Mystery of a Woman). An anthology of her work was published by the Založba Belo-modra knjižnica, which was run by noted feminist and publisher Minka Krofta. It was the first women's publishing house in Slovenia.

In Slovene literature her encouragement of young writers at the time such as Prežihov Voranc and France Bevk in her role as the editor of the Prague published journal Domači prijatelj is also acknowledged. She also translated some of Janko Kersnik and Ivan Cankar's work into German as well as Czech and Croatian plays into Slovene.

== Selected works ==
- Misterij žene, short stories (1900)
- Odsevi, short stories (1902)
- Iz naših krajev, short stories (1903)
- Iskre, short stories (1905)
- Njeno življenje, novel (1914 and 1918)
- Vladka in Mitka, (1927)
- Vladka, Mitka in Mirica, (1928)
- Hanka, novel (1917 in Croatian, 1938 in Slovene)
- Veliki in mali ljudje, (1960)

== Plays ==
- Ljubezen, (1901)
- Amerikanci, (1908)
- Unuk Kraljevića Marka (1922)
- Arditi na otoku Krku, (1923)
