= Angelca Škufca =

Slovenian farmer and folk writer (1932–2020)

- Born: December 20, 1932; Spodnje Brezovo, Slovenia
- Died: November 9, 2020 (aged 87); Slovenia
- Occupations: farmer, writer

Angelca Škufca (20 December 1932 – 9 November 2020) was a Slovenian farmer and folk writer. Though uneducated, she wrote short stories, in which she wrote about 20th-century Slovenia.

== Childhood ==
She was born on 20 December 1932 in Spodnje Brezovo to a poor family. Her mother and father were farmers. She had thirteen brothers and sisters. At the age of three, her parents sent her together with one brother to live with her aunt and uncle in the nearby village of Dedni Dol. Her uncle, a miller, was her mother's brother, and her aunt, a farmer, was her father's sister. They had no children of their own. With them, Angelca did not suffer deprivation, but from an early age she had to work hard on the farm and in the mill. She attended primary school for four years, but her further education was interrupted by the World War II.

== Work ==
After finishing school she stayed with her uncle and aunt, working on their farm and in the mill. She loved reading and built up a rich vocabulary and broad outlook despite her limited formal education. When her aunt and uncle grew old, she cared for them. After their deaths, she remained alone on the isolated farm with the mill, where, due to its remoteness, there was not even electricity. Later, when technology developed, she was provided with a solar panel so she could have light in the house. All her life she farmed and occasionally milled grain brought to her. She lived alone with several dogs.

== Illness ==
At the age of twenty-eight she fell ill, becoming weak, easily tired, and plagued by pain throughout her body. She underwent various examinations and tests, which revealed nothing, leading some to accuse her of inventing her illness. She was sent to psychiatrists and prescribed medication that harmed her. Only after ten years did someone with similar problems direct her to a doctor who finally diagnosed her condition. Just fifteen minutes after taking the prescribed medicine she felt relief. She joined the Muscular Dystrophy Association and the Christian Fellowship of the Sick and Disabled. For a long time she struggled to accept that her illness was incurable, until she took part in a pilgrimage of the sick and disabled to Brezje, where she met people even more seriously ill than herself. In an interview for the magazine Oznanjenje she later said: "The beginning, at twenty-eight, was really hard… At that time, when I didn’t know any young person who was sick, I couldn’t come to terms with my illness. … Father Simon Ašič (her confessor and friend) was the first who helped me connect with the sick. I was at a meeting at Brezje, organized for many years by Ognjišče. When I saw disabled people in wheelchairs, when they brought a disabled person to visit me, I thought what he would give to still be able to walk. So I soon learned to accept, to be grateful to God for the strength and health I still had."

== Writing ==
She began writing after reading stories in the newspaper Kmečki glas. She once sent a question to a doctor there, received a poor reply, then wrote her own response, for which she was paid. This encouraged her to write more short pieces, which were published. Thus in 1962 her career as a writer began. She was very observant and able to express well what she had learned or realized. Her sketches often carried a strong religious sentiment. She published stories in magazines and newspapers Ognjišče, Kmečki glas, and Prijatelj. She also published various articles, for example in Cerkveni glasbenik. In 1997 her first collection of short sketches, Šopek cvetja in trnja (A Bouquet of Flowers and Thorns), was published by the Cistercian Abbey of Stična. In 2002 Božji mlini (God's Mills) was published by Ognjišče, and in 2014 her book Moj apostolat (My Apostolate) appeared with Salve.

== Later life and death ==
In 2020, Angelca Škufca moved into a retirement home. She continued to write as long as she was able. Her final story, "Bomo šli kmalu v nebesa" (Will We Soon Go to Heaven), was published in the November 2020 issue of Ognjišče. She died on 9 November 2020.

== Works ==
- Šopek cvetja in trnja (A Bouquet of Flowers and Thorns), short stories, Stična, Cistercian Abbey, 1997
- Božji mlini (God's Mills), short stories, Koper, Ognjišče, Muscular Dystrophy Association of Slovenia, 2002
- Moj apostolat (My Apostolate), short stories, Ljubljana, Salve, 2014

== See also ==
- Anka Salmič
