= Irena Žerjal =

Slovene poet, writer and translator (1940–1018)

- Born: 20 April 1940; San Giuseppe della Chiusa, Kingdom of Italy (now in Italy)
- Died: 2018 (aged 77–78)
- Occupations: Poet, writer, translator and teacher

Irena Žerjal (20 April 1940 – 2018) was a Slovene poet, writer and translator who also used the pen name Maja Tul in her early work.

Žerjal was born in San Giuseppe della Chiusa (Slovene: Ricmanje) in Italy in 1940. She studied Slovene and Russian at the University of Ljubljana. She taught at various Slovene language secondary schools in the Trieste region. She writes poetry and short stories. She was married to the public intellectual, sociologist and politician Jože Pučnik from 1964 to 1969 and lived with him in Hamburg, Germany, for a while.

== Published works ==
=== Poetry ===
- Goreče oljke (Burning Olive Trees), 1969
- Topli gozdovi (Warm Forests), 1972
- Klišarna utopičnih idej (The Cliche Factory of Utopic Ideas), 1974
- Pobegla zvezda (The Fugitive Star), 1977
- Gladež (Famine), 1982
- Alabaster (Alabaster), 1984
- Let morske lastovice (Flight of the Sea Swallow), 1987

=== Prose ===
- Tragedijica na Grobljah (The Small Tragedy at Groblje), 1973
- Morje, ribe, asfalt (Sea, Fish, Asphaplt), co-author with Marija Mislej, 1976
- Burja in kamni (The Bora and Stones), co-author with Nadja Švara in Marija Mislej, 1987
- Magnetofonski trak (The Recording Tape), 1994
