= Anica Černej =

Slovenian writer (1900–1944)

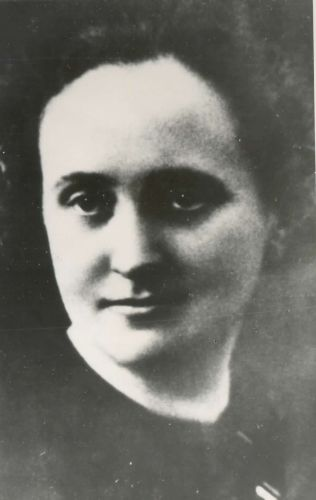
Anica Černej in the 1920s

Anica Černej (3 April 1900, in Čadram, Oplotnica – 3 May 1944, in Neubrandenburg) was a Slovene teacher, author and poet. She wrote poems for children, youth and adults, lectured on youth literature, and in 1922 published an essay about the children's poet, Oton Župančič. Černej died in 1944 in Neubrandenburg concentration camp after being arrested in 1943. A school in Makole, a kindergarten in Celje and streets in Slovenske Konjice, Slovenska Bistrica and Dogoše near Maribor are named after her.

== Early life and education ==
Černej was born in 1900, and her parents were both teachers. She attended school in Griže, Žalec in 1905, and then in 1915 went to Maribor, where she attended a private school for school nurses. Graduating in 1919, she worked at a school in Griže before moving a year later to Celje.

From 1924 Černej attended the Higher Pedagogical School in Zagreb for two years, learning to teach mathematics and sciences. After teaching for several years, she returned to Zagreb graduating in 1930 with a degree in pedagogy, psychology and mathematics.

== Career ==
Černej worked at a high school and the college of education in Ljubljana, where her main interests were social and pedagogical subjects. She was also a writer and pedagogue. Černej wrote poems for children, youth and adults, as well as an essay about Oton Župančič as a children's poet in Popotni. She provided an overview of youth literature for an exhibition called Slovene Books 1918–1938, and gave lectures on the subject. Černej also wrote on pedagogy and psychology for the magazine Popotnik.

In the autumn of 1943, she was arrested together with many professors and students by German occupying armed forces. After ten days of interrogation she was sent to Ravensbrück concentration camp and later on Neubrandenburg, where she died shortly thereafter aged 44. Her cause of death was likely tuberculosis. She was cremated at Ravensbrück concentration camp.

== Legacy ==
In Celje a kindergarten is named after Černej and streets in Slovenske Konjice, Slovenski Bistrica, Lisce and Dogoš near Maribor are named after her. The primary school in Makola is also named after her.

== See also ==
- Slovenian literature
