= Branko Gradišnik =

Slovene writer and translator (born 1951)

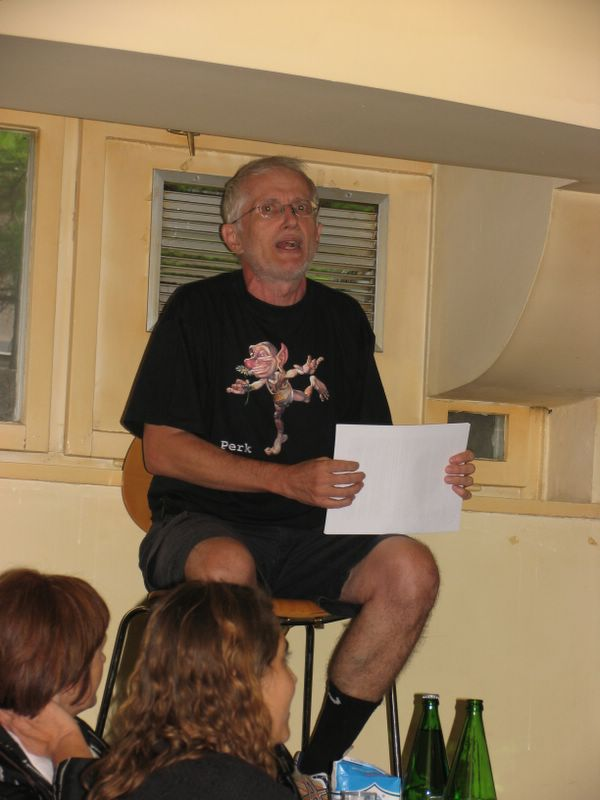
- Branko Gradišnik in 2006
- Born: 7 January 1951 (age 75); Ljubljana, Socialist Federal Republic of Yugoslavia (now in Slovenia)
- Occupations: Writer, translator
- Writing career
- Notable works: Zemlja, zemlja, zemlja; Leta; Nekdo drug
- Notable awards: Prešeren Foundation Award; 1982 Zemlja, zemlja, zemlja

Branko Gradišnik (born 7 January 1951) is a Slovene writer and translator. He writes short stories and is a well-known columnist that writes for the newspaper Delo and other Slovene publications. In 2004 he was a candidate for mayor of Ljubljana.

Branko Gradišnik was born in Ljubljana in 1951 and is the son of author and translator Janez Gradišnik. He received a bachelor's degree in art history and sociology from the University of Ljubljana and holds a master's degree in creative writing from Lancaster University. In 1982 he won the Prešeren Foundation Award for his collection of predominantly science fiction short stories titled Zemlja, zemlja, zemlja (Earth, Earth, Earth). He is also known for his translation of The Lord of the Rings trilogy into Slovene.

== Selected works ==
- Čas (Time), short stories, (1977)
- Mavrična krila (Rainbow Wings), short science fiction stories in an anthology with other authors (1978)
- Kerubini (Cherubins), satirical novel co-written with Emil Filipčič under the single pseudonym Jožef Paganel
- Zemlja, zemlja, zemlja (Earth, Earth, Earth), short stories (1981)
- Leta (The Years), novel, (1984)
- Mistifikcije (Mystifications), short stories, (1987)
- Nekdo drug (Someone Else), crime novel, (1990)
- Nekaj drugega (Something Else), (1990)
- Igre: volčje in ovčje (Games: For Wolves and Sheep), (1993)
- Roka, voda, kamen (Hand, Water, Stone) (2007)
