= Karel Mauser =

Slovene poet, author, and playwright (1918–1977)

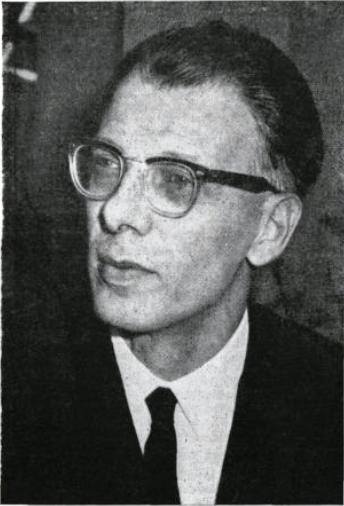
- Born: June 19, 1918; Bled, Kingdom of Yugoslavia
- Died: January 21, 1977 (aged 58); Cleveland, Ohio
- Resting place: All Souls Cemetery, Chardon, Ohio
- Occupations: Poet, author, and playwright

Karel Mauser (August 11, 1918 – January 21, 1977) was a Slovene poet, author, and playwright. He is ranked among the best writers of Slovene postwar prose.

== Life ==
Karel Mauser was born in Bled to Franc and Helena Mauser. In 1939 he started studying theology in Ljubljana, but he did not graduate because he left the seminary in 1944. While serving as an assistant medic with the Village Guard (Slovene: Vaška straža), he was captured at Turjak Castle and taken to the prisons in Kočevje and then held at Stična Abbey, from where he fled to Ljubljana and worked there as a co-editor of the book series Slovenčeva knjižnica (The Slovene Library). After fleeing Slovenia twice (at the end of 1945 and in early 1946), he made his way to the United States through the Carinthian refugee camps in 1950, and he worked until 1976 at a factory in Cleveland producing drill bits.

== Literary work ==
Mauser began to publish his first prose and poems in 1938 in the newspapers Dom in svet, Mentor, Mlada setev, and Vrtec, and after his exile mostly with the Hermagoras Society in Klagenfurt and Slovene Cultural Action in Buenos Aires, as well as in the domestic and expatriate press in the United States and Canada.

He continued the Slovene tradition of the local story with stories from village life with typically emotionally colored narratives and morally defined literary characters. Mauser's best works are the novella Sin mrtvega (Son of the Dead) and the novel Ljudje pod bičem (People under the Scourge). Both works deal with the subject of World War II and the first years after it. Along with the historical image of the time, they mainly show the moral and emotional upheavals that accompany the destinies of the characters in the story. Mauser also relates to traditional Slovenian prose with the theme of the clerical profession, which is presented in the play Kaplan Klemen (Chaplain Klemen), and in his unfinished biography of Bishop Frederic Baraga, Le eno je potrebno (Only One is Necessary). Mauser's prose has been translated into French, German, and Spanish.

His posthumous poetry collection Zemlja sem in večnost (I Am the Earth and Eternity) contains religious poetry and reflective poems about nature, as well as philosophical, hymn-like, and reflective poems.
