= Franček Rudolf =

Slovenian poet, author, screenwriter, playwright, film director, critic and journalist

Franček Rudolf (born 5 September 1944) is a Slovenian poet, author, screenwriter, playwright, film director, critic, and journalist.

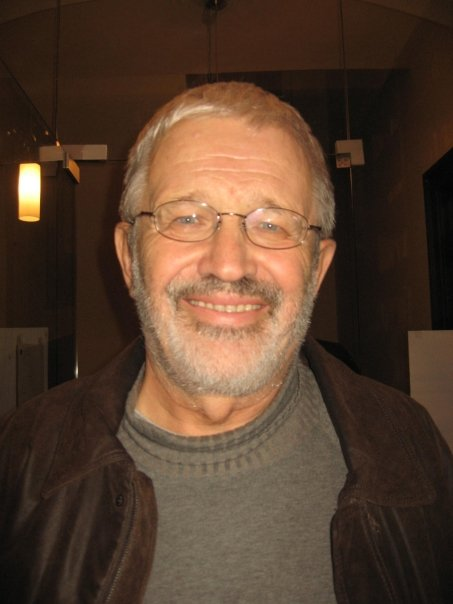
Franček Rudolf

Rudolf was born in Lipovci, Slovenia. He grew up in Yugoslavia under Tito, completing high school in Maribor and graduating from the Academy for Theatre, Radio, Film and Television (AGRFT) at the University of Ljubljana.

He started out as an actor in 1969, but soon became involved in screenwriting. In the 1970s he worked as a screenwriter and eventually director for Viba Film. In addition to his film and television work, he taught film classes and wrote film reviews in the 1980s. In 1994 he became an editor at Radio Slovenije and remained there until his retirement in 2006.

Rudolf's first book of poetry, Dnevi v Predalu (Days in the Drawer), was published in 1968. His most recent poetry volume is Dež, ulice, mesec (Rain, Streets, Moon) was published in 2004. His first novel, Kam je mama šla? (Where Has Mother Gone?) was published in 1975. Fifteen novels followed, the most recent being Tolmun na dnu reke (Pool at the Bottom of the River) published in 2006.
