= Cvetka Bevc =

Slovene writer and poet

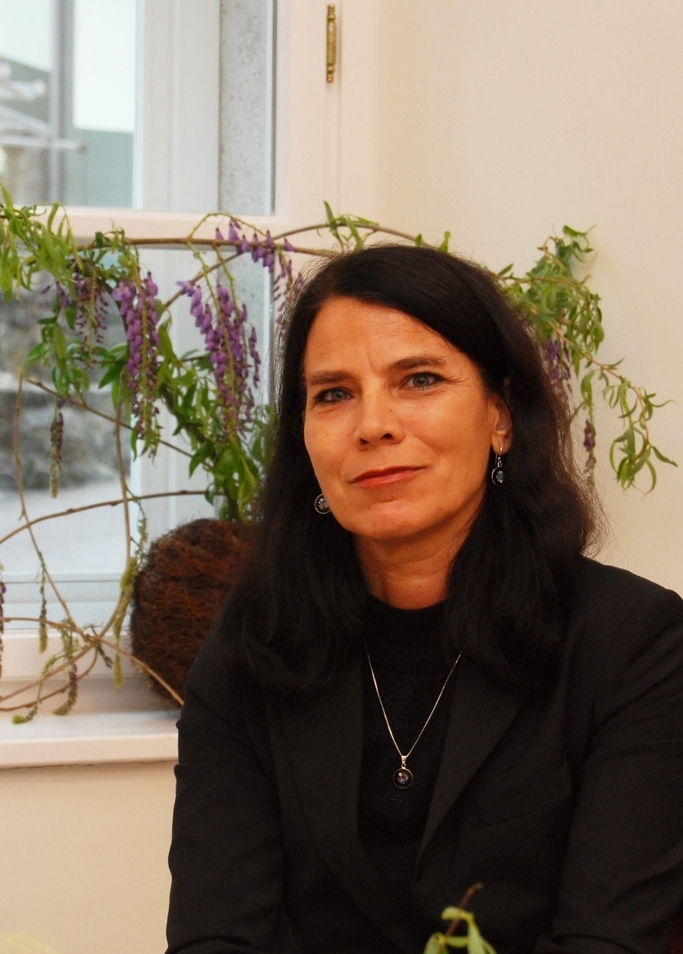
- Cvetka Bevc at a literary evening in Žiri, Skofja Loka, in April 2011. Photo: Gregor Grešak
- Born: 29 October 1960; Slovenj Gradec, Socialist Federal Republic of Yugoslavia (now in Slovenia)
- Occupations: Writer, poet and musicologist
- Writing career
- Notable works: Zgodbe iz somraka Potovci

Cvetka Bevc (born 29 October 1960 in Slovenj Gradec) is a Slovene writer and poet.

She studied musicology and comparative literature at the University of Ljubljana and also attended post-graduate study at University College Cork. She worked as an editor at Glasbena mladina, a music journal for young people, at the Radiotelevizija Slovenija, Slovenia's national public broadcasting organization, and the Slovene Writers' Association. She writes poetry, prose, radio plays and children's stories. Her novel Potovci (Travellers) was one of the five finalists for the 2012 Kresnik Award.

== Published works ==
Prose

- Prigode Špelce Žvekič, 2003
- Soba gospe Bernarde, 2007
- Zgodbe iz somraka, 2007
- Škampi v glavi, 2010
- Desetka, 2011
- Potovci (Travellers), 2011

Poetry collections

- Prelet žerjavov, 2004
- Med ločjem, 2005
- Odbleski, 2009

Children's books

- Klavirski duhec Jošti, 2005
- Abecednik zaljubljene krastače, 2007
- Labod Zaki najde starše, 2008
- Veverica Mica in druge pravljice iz Zelenega gozda, 2009
- Pesem za vilo, 2009
