= Berta Bojetu =

Slovene writer, poet and actress

- Born: 7 February 1946; Maribor, Socialist Federal Republic of Yugoslavia (now in Slovenia)
- Died: 16 March 1997 (aged 51); Ljubljana, Slovenia
- Occupations: writer, poet, actress
- Writing career
- Notable works: Filio ni doma, Ptičja hiša
- Notable awards: Kresnik Award; 1996 Ptičja hiša

Berta Bojetu (also Berta Bojetu Boeta; 7 February 1946 – 16 March 1997) was a Slovene writer, poet and actress.

== Life ==
Bojetu was born in Maribor in 1946. She studied at the Faculty of Education at the University of Ljubljana and at the Academy of Performing Arts in Ljubljana. She worked at the Ljubljana Puppet Theatre and was one of the cofounders of the theatre group Koreodrama. She died in Ljubljana in 1997.

In 1996 she received the Kresnik Award for her novel Ptičja hiša (The Birdhouse).

In 2002 an international symposium about Bojetu's work was organised in Maribor. The papers given at the symposium were published in 2004.

She was the mother of the historian and translator Klemen Jelinčič Boeta.

== Published works ==
- Žabon, poetry, (1979)
- Besede iz hiše Karlstein, poetry, (1988)
- Filio ni doma (Filo is not at Home), novel, (1980)
- Ptičja hiša (The Birdhouse), novel, (1995)
