= Gabriela Babnik =

Slovene writer, literary critic and translator

Gabriela Babnik Ouattara
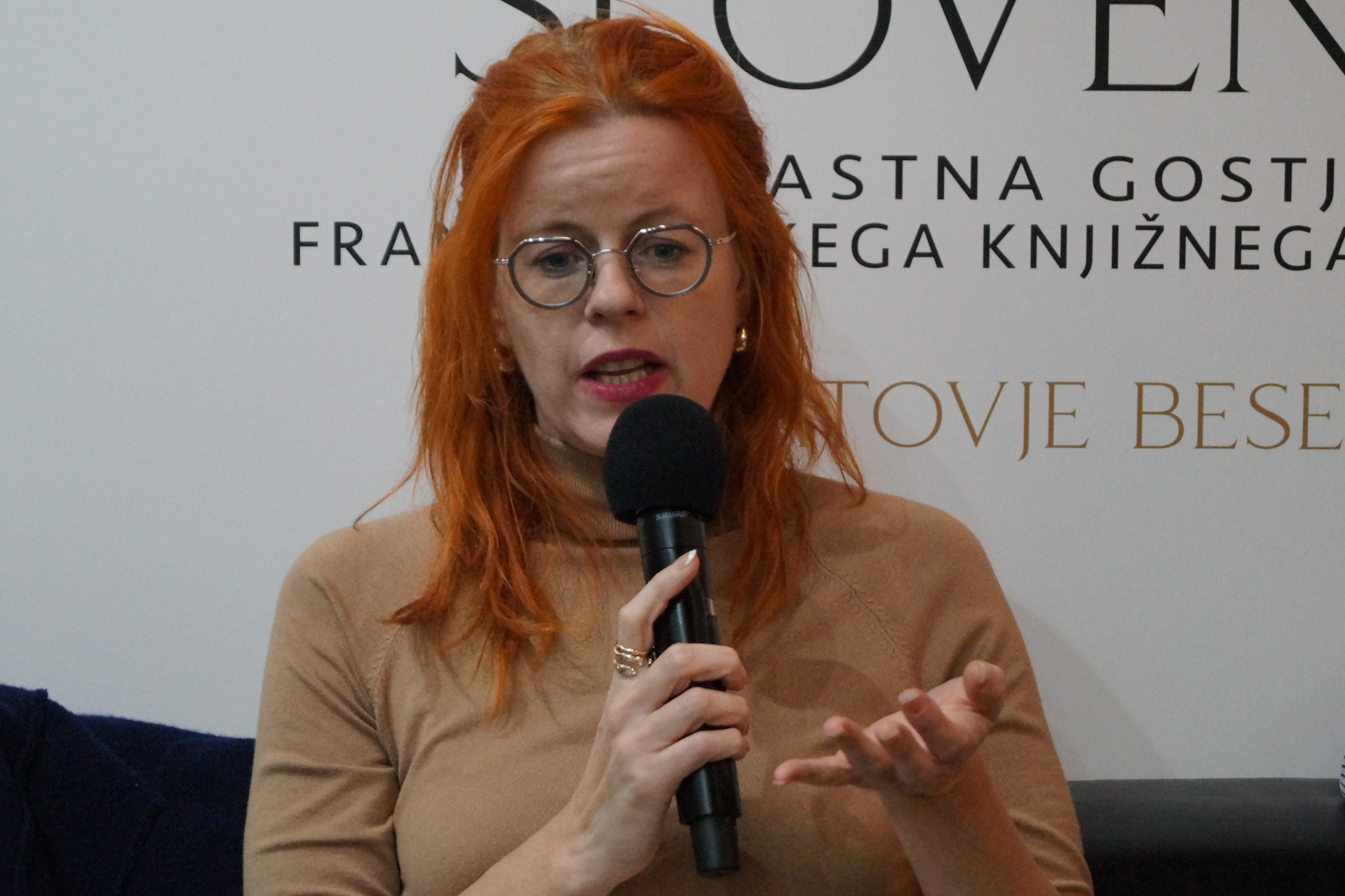
- Gabriela Babink, 2023
- Born: 1979 (age 46–47); Göppingen, West Germany
- Occupations: Writer, literary critic and translator
- Writing career
- Notable works: Koža iz bombaža, Sušna doba

Gabriela Babnik (born 1979) is a Slovene writer, literary critic and translator. She has published three novels and her journalistic literary and film criticism regularly appears in national newspapers and magazines in Slovenia.

Babnik was born in Göppingen in West Germany in 1979. She studied comparative literature at the University of Ljubljana and then travelled to Africa, particularly Burkina Faso, which has become the inspiration for much of her work. She holds an MA on the Contemporary Nigerian Novel and has also translated Chimamanda Ngozi Adichie's novel Half of a Yellow Sun into Slovene (Slovene title: Polovica rumenega sonca).

Her first novel Koža iz bombaža won the Best First Book Award at the Slovenian Book Fair in 2007. Her third novel Sušna doba won the 2013 European Union Prize for Literature (Slovenia).

== Published works ==
- Koža iz bombaža, 2007
- V visoki travi, 2009
- Sušna doba, 2011

== Translated into English ==
"Dry Season": London, Istros Books, 2015.

== Translated into Italian ==
"La stagione secca" (transl. by M. Obit): Milano-Udine, Mimesis edizioni, 2017.
