= Rudolf Pečjak =

Slovene writer

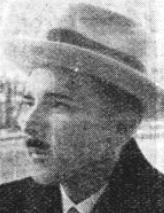
Rudolf Pečjak

Rudolf Pečjak (9 May 1891 – 27 December 1940) was a Slovene writer.

== Early life ==
Pečjak attended school in Novo Mesto. In 1921, he passed the examinations for a teachers course. Then he began a career as a teacher. His first job was at schools in Ribnici, where he worked between 1913 and 1917. In 1920 he joined the boys school in Ljubljana. Then he shifted to the school in Monfalcone, teaching from 1921 to 1924. From 1924 he was a district school inspector in Kranj. In 1928 he was appointed the director of civic school in St. Veit, a post he held until his death in 1940.

He was father of Slovene author and psychologist Vid Pečjak.

Pečjak began his writing career in 1914. He wrote songs and educational records for the youth and for kindergarten magazines such as Angeljček. He also wrote educational articles aimed at Slovenian teachers. In 1939, his kindergarten magazine Pvest Mikica and Mokica was published. It received rave reviews. He was also involved in collecting Japanese fairy tales for the Vrtčevo library. Pečjak was the editor of the book Our Public School, published in 1929. Beside his role in public schools, Pečjak was a famous lecturer, who often lectured in educational as well as professional organizations.
