= Zdenka Žebre =

Slovenian writer

- Born: 15 November 1920; Ljubljana, Kingdom of Serbs, Croats and Slovenes (now in Slovenia)
- Died: 2011 (aged 90–91)
- Occupation: writer
- Writing career
- Notable works: Okomfu Anoči, Se spominjaš Afrike, Jernejček v daljni deželi

Zdenka Žebre (15 November 1920 – 2011) was a Slovene writer, best known for her books with an African theme.

== Early years ==
Žebre was born in Ljubljana in 1920. She studied Law but her studies were interrupted by the Second World War. In 1963 she moved to Africa with her husband and lived in Ethiopia and Ghana for over a decade.

== Writing career ==
Africa inspired her to start writing and she worked on her novel Okomfu Anoči about the Ashanti priest and statesman Okomfo Anokye. She continued to use Africa as an inspiration for her work, including the three children's books she published. She also wrote a memoir of her life in Africa in the autobiographical novel entitled Se spominjaš Afrike (Do You Remember Africa?), published in 2003.

== Published works ==
for adults

- Okomfu Anoči (Okomfo Anokye), 1982
- Kamen na srcu (A Stone on the Heart), 1996
- Se spominjaš Afrike? (Do You Remember Africa?), 2003

for children

- Jernejček v daljni deželi (Jernejček in a Far Away Land), 1979
- Petra in gazela Frčela (Petra and Frčela the Gazelle), 1987
- V čudežni svet in nazaj (To the Magic Land and Back), 1997
