= Meta Kušar =

Slovene poet and essayist (born 1952)

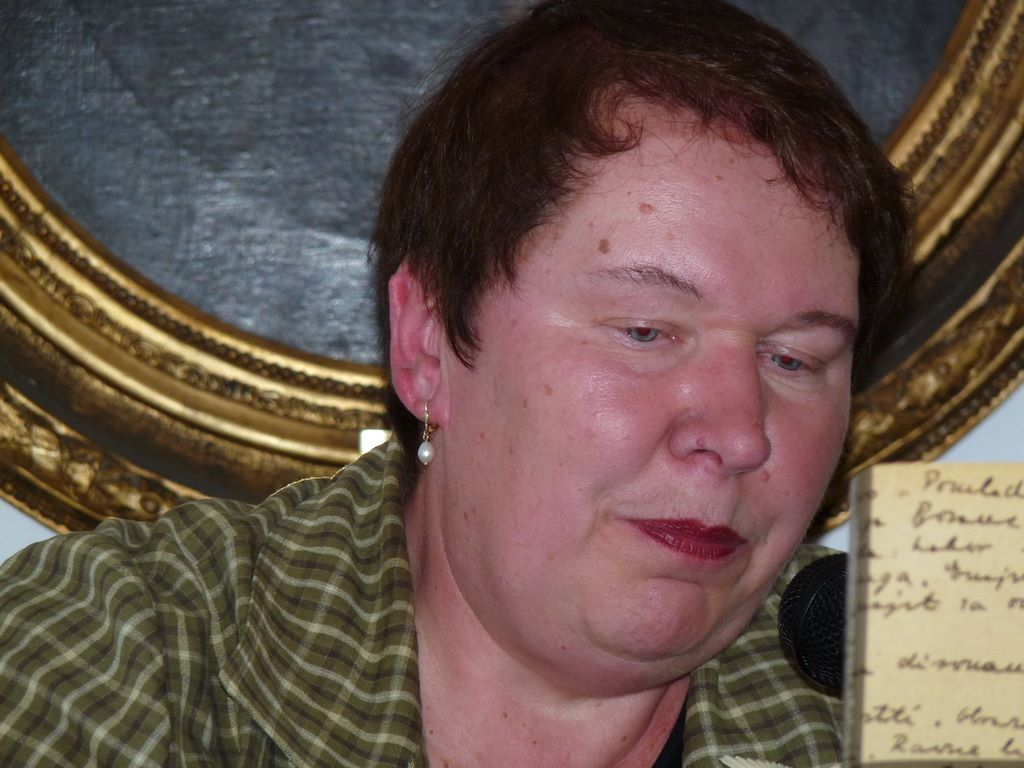
- Born: 10 May 1952; Ljubljana, Socialist Federal Republic of Yugoslavia (now in Slovenia)
- Occupations: Poet and essayist
- Writing career
- Notable work: Kaj je poetično ali ura ilegale
- Notable awards: Rožanc Award; 2012 for Kaj je poetično ali ura ilegale

Meta Kušar (born 10 May 1952) is a Slovene poet and essayist.

Kušar was born in Ljubljana in 1952. She studied Slovene language and literature at the University of Ljubljana and is best known for her poetry.

In 2012 she received the Rožanc Award for her collection of essays Kaj je poetično ali ura ilegale.

== Published works ==
- Madeira, poetry (1993)
- Svila in Lan (Silk and Flax), poetry (1997)
- Ljubljana, poetry (2004)
- Kaj je poetično ali ura ilegale (What is Poetic or the Hour of the Underground), essays (2011)
- Jaspis, poetry (2008)
- Intervju, interview (2009)
- Vrt, poetry (2014)
- Azur/Himmelblau, poetry (2015)
- Zmaj, poetry (2021)
