= Marija Rus =

Slovenian French scholar and poet (1921–2019)

- Born: Marija Rus; 2 August 1921; Novo Mesto, Kingdom of Serbs, Croats and Slovenes
- Died: April 2019 (aged 97); Brežice, Slovenia
- Occupations: Romance philologist, French professor, translator, poet
- Awards: Chevalier des Palmes académiques (France, 1985)

Marija Rus (2 August 1921 – April 2019) was a Slovenian Romance philologist, professor of French, translator, and poet. She was the first French teacher at Nova Gorica Grammar School. She contributed to the preparation of textbooks and curricula for the teaching of French. For her merits she received the French decoration Chevalier des Palmes académiques (Knight of the Order of Academic Palms). She also translated French poetry and wrote religious lyric poetry.

== Childhood and education ==
She was born as the eldest child in a Slovenian family on 2 August 1921, in Novo Mesto. Her mother was the teacher Amalija Vardjan (1884–1943) from Črnomelj, and her father was the geographer and historian Jože Rus (1888–1945) from Ribnica. She had a younger sister and brother. Between 1929 and 1931 the family moved to Ljubljana, where she began attending a girls' primary school run by the Ursuline nuns. After completing primary school, she enrolled in a classical grammar school. During this time, her father left her mother. Marija remained with her sister and brother and their mother. In 1940, she completed secondary school with honours. She enrolled in the study of classical philology at the Faculty of Arts in Ljubljana.

In September 1943, her mother, already retired, went to her native Črnomelj to collect food for the family, as there was a shortage in Ljubljana behind the wire. While returning through Novo Mesto she died during an aerial bombing. Soon afterwards Marija's brother entered the seminary and began studying theology, and later became a medic with the Slovene Home Guard. In January 1944, her father was arrested by the Nazis and deported first to Dachau and, toward the end of the Second World War, to Buchenwald, where he died before the end of the war. After the war, her brother withdrew with the Home Guard to Carinthia and was later returned to Teharje and murdered, probably in a mine in Hrastnik.

Because of this, she and her sister, who later became a teacher, were expelled from the university for two years and thus left without means of support. She later recalled this in her first poetry collection: "I was young, physically and mentally healthy, and despite everything terrible I experienced, I preserved my faith in God." In 1947, she was admitted back to the university, took her final exam, and graduated in February in classical languages, ancient history with archaeology, and French.

== Work ==
=== Teaching ===
After graduating, she first worked as a teacher of mathematics and Russian at the lower secondary school in Kozina and as a Russian teacher at the lower secondary school in Tomaj, where she worked for four years. In 1951, she passed the professional examination for high-school professor and in the autumn took up a post as a Latin teacher at the grammar school in Šempeter pri Gorici. The following year, the school moved to Nova Gorica, and Marija continued teaching at the newly built Nova Gorica grammar school.

In 1955, teaching of Latin was discontinued at Yugoslav grammar schools, so she began teaching French at the Nova Gorica grammar school. She did this work until her retirement in June 1980. In her own words, French was "a language that had no tradition in the Littoral Slovenia". Although fairly conventional forms of foreign-language teaching prevailed in the pedagogy of the time, she used a method of exceptionally active work and communication. In 1961, she further developed her French in Grenoble, in 1965 in Pau, in 1971 in Paris, and in 1972 in Dijon. She established herself as one of the best French teachers in Slovenia. Her pupils received a number of awards.

Working with the SRS Institute of Education, she helped prepare textbooks and curricula for teaching French. She worked with the youth section of the mountaineering society, ran the library of the workers’ cultural society Svoboda (Delavsko prosvetno društvo Svoboda), assisted as a proofreader for the Nova Gorica Volunteer Fire Brigade (Prostovoljno gasilsko društvo Nova Gorica), and was active in the Association of Friends of Youth (Društvo prijateljev mladine).

For her services in teaching French, in 1985, she received the French decoration Chevalier des Palmes académiques (Knight of the Order of Academic Palms).

=== Literary work ===
She began writing poetry in her youth. Her first poems were published between 1949 and 1951 in the magazine Razgledi. During her work at the grammar school, she occasionally published in various periodicals in the Slovene Littoral. She devoted herself more intensely to poetry after retirement. In her poems, she described her inner inclinations and feelings, her experience of 20th-century Slovenian history, her Catholic faith, and nature.

Between 1981 and 1985, she published poems in the magazine Mladika, and between 1981 and 1984, in the magazine Primorska srečanja ("Littoral Encounters”). In 1998, her poetry collection Pesmi in časi (Poems and Times) was published by the Trieste publisher Mladika. She also worked as a translator and translated poetry by Stéphane Mallarmé, Paul Valéry, Charles Baudelaire, and Gérard Nerval.

== Later life and death ==
After retiring, she moved to Ljubljana at Christmas 1980. There she became actively involved in the parish of Ježica (Ljubljana), which she had not been able to do earlier as a teacher. She worked on translation from French and on poetry. She never married and had no children. She died in early April 2019, in Brežice.

== Honours ==
- Chevalier des Palmes académiques (Knight of the Order of Academic Palms, France, 1985)

== Bibliography ==
- Pesmi in časi (Poems and Times; poetry; Mladika, Trieste, 1998)
