= Anka Salmič =

Slovenian farmer, folk healer and poet (1902–1969)

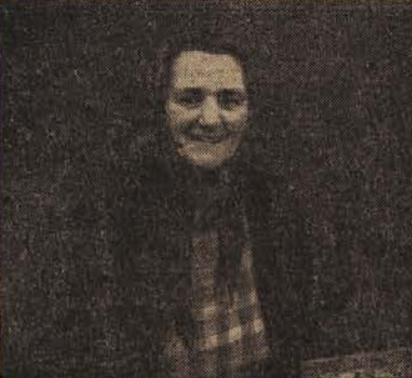
- Anka Salmič around 1950
- Born: Ana Salmič; May 29, 1902; Gorenja vas pri Leskovcu, Slovenia (then Austria-Hungary)
- Died: September 2, 1969 (aged 67); Novo Mesto, Slovenia (then Socialist Republic of Slovenia, SFR Yugoslavia)
- Occupations: field labourer, maidservant, farmer, folk healer, folk composer, poet

Ana Salmič, also known as Anka Salmič, (Note: Also known as Ančka Salmič, Anica Salmič, or Ani Salmič.) (29 May 1902 – 2 September 1969) was a Slovenian farmer, folk healer and poet. Born into a poor rural family, she received limited formal education and supported herself through agricultural labour, while developing a body of folk-inspired poetry that was published in newspapers, magazines, and self-published collections. During the Second World War she was deported to a Nazi camp, where she continued to write poetry and create stories and plays for fellow prisoners, later publishing works reflecting her experiences of exile and wartime suffering.

== Childhood ==
She was born into a Slovenian family on 29 May 1902 in Gorenja vas pri Leskovcu. Her mother was the small farmer and field labourer Franca Hočevar, and her father was the small farmer and field labourer Jožef Salmič. She had eight siblings. Her family was very poor. She attended school for five years. Although she wished to continue her schooling, her parents could not afford it due to poverty. She read many books, especially poetry. She was particularly fond of Simon Gregorčič’s poetry, so at home they sometimes even called her Simon Gregorčič. As a child she often sang melodies to her own lyrics. She wrote down her first poem at the age of seventeen.

== Adult life and writings ==
=== Interwar period ===
After finishing school, she began working as a field labourer on nearby farms. She supported herself this way into old age. In 1925, one of her poems was published under a pseudonym in the Catholic girls’ magazine Vigred. That same year she intended to travel to Canada to join her fiancé. When everything had already been arranged, she received word that he had died in a mining accident. She wrote many poems to her deceased fiancé. To ease her sorrow, she went to Zagreb to work as a domestic helper for a family. When the lady of the house caught her composing poems a few times, she would always scold her that poetry was not for a servant girl.

After a few years, she returned to her home region. At the age of twenty-seven, in 1929, she gave birth to her only son. As an unmarried mother, she was despised and mocked by the villagers; she kept to herself and, when she was not working in the fields, spent her time alone with her son in their room. In solitude she often wrote poetry. She also wrote a few stories. She sent poems to magazines and newspapers where she was not personally known. Thus her poems, and a few stories, were published in magazines and newspapers Kmečka žena (The Peasant Woman), Ženski svet (Women’s World), Jadranska straža, the Calendar of the saint Mohor Society (Koledar Mohorjeve družbe), and Vigred. She often also composed melodies for the poems she wrote. Others wrote these down for her, since she did not know musical notation. She also practiced folk healing. In 1940 she self-published a collection of her poems Cvetje z neobdelanih gredic (Flowers from Untended Beds).

=== WW II ===
In 1940, Nazi Germany occupied Yugoslavia, which at the time included Slovenian territory. The following year, the Nazis took Anka Salmič, her son, and some fellow villagers from the Krško area to a camp in Germany. In the camp, despite harsh circumstances, she continued writing poetry and comforted her compatriots. She made up fairy tales and stories and told them to imprisoned children. She also wrote plays and recitations for the imprisoned youth.

=== Post-war period ===
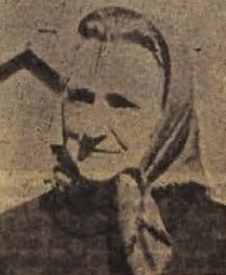
Anka Salmič in 1967

In September 1945 she returned to her homeland with her son and the surviving fellow villagers. When they reached the railway station at Jesenice, she sang, together with others returning, upon seeing Triglav the song Hrepenenje po domovini (Longing for the Homeland), which she had written and composed music to in the camp. She returned with her son to Krško and supported herself by farming. In 1967 a collection of her poems about the wartime period, Iz črnih dni pregnanstva (From the Dark Days of Exile), was published in Krško.

== Later life and death ==
In old age she moved in with her son’s family in Leskovec pri Krškem, where she lived until her death. She looked after her grandchildren while her son and daughter-in-law were at work, and wrote poetry in the evenings. She continued to practice folk healing. She drew much inspiration for her poems from the forest. She died on 2 September 1969 in the hospital in Novo Mesto.

== Legacy ==
A book titled Moja pesem (My Song), containing her previously unpublished poetry, was published in Krško in 1995. In Leskovec pri Krškem, where she spent her last ten years, one of the main streets is named after her, Ulica Anke Salmič (Anka Salmič Street).

== Bibliography ==
- Cvetje z neobdelanih gredic (Flowers from Untended Beds) (poetry, 1940)
- Iz črnih dni pregnanstva (From the Dark Days of Exile) (poetry, Krško, 1967)
- Moja pesem (My Song) (poetry, Krško, 1995)

== See also ==
- Julka Gantar Fortuna
- Angelca Škufca
