= Marija Mijot =

Slovenian seamstress, folk poet and writer (1902–1994)

- Born: Marija Mijot; May 23, 1902; San Giovanni, Trieste
- Died: August 6, 1994 (aged 92); San Giovanni, Trieste
- Occupations: Shop assistant, maid, seamstress, writer, playwright
- Known for: Her literary work in which she preserved the atmosphere, customs and traditions of working-class Slovene minority in Trieste

Marija Mijot (May 23,1902 – August 6, 1994) was a Slovenian seamstress, dialectal poet, writer and playwright. She was important for her literary work in which she preserved the atmosphere, customs and traditions of working-class Slovene minority in Trieste.

== Childhood ==
Marija Mijot was born into a Slovene family on 23 May 1902 in San Giovanni, a suburb of the Austro-Hungarian city of Trieste (now in Italy). Her mother was washerwoman Ivanka Hrovatin, and her father carpenter Anton Mijot. She completed primary school and a two-year commercial school at the school of saints Cyril and Methodius in Trieste. When she was twelve years old the First World War began. It brought misery, hunger and sorrow to the suburb of San Giovanni. During the war, she wrote her first poems in the local Slovenian dialect. They were so sad and hopeless that, when reading them, she and her mother burst into tears and threw them into the fire.

== First publications ==
As a child, Marija wanted to become a teacher, but because of poverty, she could not continue her studies. After the war, she was employed as a saleswoman in the Trieste free port. After six years she left that job and began to earn her living as a seamstress and housemaid, which she continued until her death. She attended various evening courses, read a great deal of Slovene and Russian literature, and subscribed to Slovene newspapers and magazines. As a gifted singer, she studied singing for four years at the Trieste music school Ateneo musicale. She sang in the local church choir and in the Sokol choir. She wrote from the First World War onward, but did not publish her works. She always wrote in the local Slovenian dialect. After the Second World War friends persuaded her to send some poems to the newspaper Primorski dnevnik. They were printed there. The committee for folklore at the Slovene Academy of Sciences and Arts also praised them. Her poems were later published in the almanac Jadranski koledar, in the magazines Zaliv and Dan, and in other Trieste periodicals. They were read on Radio Trst A and Radio Koper.

== Souze jn smeh ==
In 1962, her poetry collection Souze jn smeh (Tears and Laughter) was published by the Založništvo tržaškega tiska (Trieste Publishing House) in Trieste. The book contained 25 poems. Marija Mijot stated that with the book she wanted to preserve for future generations the former atmosphere, customs and traditions that were rapidly sinking into oblivion. The foreword was written by the writer Vladimir Bartol. It was illustrated by the Slovenian librarian and painter Antonija Kolerič. The book was so successful that in 1969 the Založništvo tržaškega tiska reprinted it. In the new edition, she added 39 new poems, among them also some poems for children. The introduction was written by Vladimir Bartol. At the core of the book are poems about nature and people and about former life in San Giovanni. Here she captured everyday life in the house, in the yard, in the fields, washerwomen by the brook, wakes by the deceased, carnival time, the fair, the bonfire night, the conversations of grandmothers about everything that was happening in the village.Her children's poems are written in very simple language.

== Later life and death ==
Besides poetry she also wrote plays. These too were written in the local Slovenian dialect. After the Second World War, she also devoted herself to the renewal of cultural life in San Giovanni. At the Trieste society Slavko Škamperle she sang, acted and practiced gymnastics. She was also a gymnastics instructor and an assistant at the Trieste study library. She died on 6 August 1994 in San Giovanni.

== Published works ==
- Betuon (play)
- Dva vinska bratca in nočne prikazni (one-act play)
- Mandrjerke se pričkajuo: slike iz življenja svetoivanskih strin (play)
- Slika iz življenja svetoivanksih manderjerjev (play)
- Na izletu (play)
- Souze jn smeh (poetry, 1962)
- Souze jn smeh (poetry, 1969)
- Lučke. Božična balada (poetry, 1969)
- Lučke. Na božično viljo pad kaminan: (slika mandrjarjev) (poetry, 1969)
- Kar naprej trajati: šest tržaških pesnikov (poetry, 1994)
- Otroške pesmi in dramski prizori (various literary forms, 2012)

== See also ==
- Slovene literature

== Sources ==
- Enciklopedija Slovenije; book 7, Mladinska knjiga, Ljubljana, 1993
- Janež, Stanko, A Survey of Slovene Literature, Založba Obzorja Maribor, 1978
