= Vida Jeraj =

Slovene writer and poet

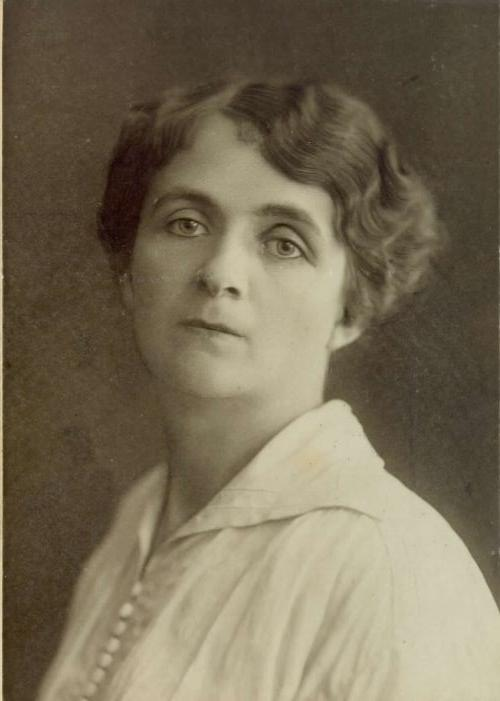
- Born: Frančiška Vovk; 31 March 1860; Zagorice (now Bled), Austrian Empire
- Died: 1 May 1932 (aged 72); Ljubljana, Kingdom of Yugoslavia
- Writing career
- Language: Slovene
- Genre: Poetry

Vida Jeraj, born Frančiška Vovk, (31 March 1860 – 1 May 1932) was a Slovene poet and lyricist. Born in Zagorice (now Bled), she travelled extensively through the Austrian Empire and, later the Kingdom of Serbs, Croats and Slovenes, living in Ljubljana, Vienna and Kassel, initially with her mother and then later her husband, the violinist Karl Jeraj. After graduating as a teacher in 1895, she taught in primary schools. Much of her work was tragic, particularly following the death of her son in 1906, and her poetry covered a wide range of topics, and was influenced by literary modernism, Biblical themes and fairy tales. In the aftermath of the First World War, she helped run a charity for blind soldiers. She also wrote poetry for children, and had some of her work set to music by her husband. In the 1920s, she returned to Ljubljana and was active in the Drustva Slovenkih Leposlovcev Socialnogospodarskega in Kulturnega Zenskega (Women's Social, Economic and Cultural Association of Slovenia), and died in 1932.

== Biography ==
Jeraj was born in Zagorice (now Bled) in the Austrian Empire on 31 March 1860, the daughter of France Vovk and Neza, a native of Kropa. Her father was the nephew of the poet France Prešeren. He could be violent when drunk, which, combined her mother's temperament, meant that, although she was beloved as their only surviving child, her early life was full of tension. The family lost their estate due to debt and moved to Ljubljana, where her mother made a living as a cook for workers of the railway. She and her mother subsequently moved to Vienna and Kassel, leaving her father behind. At age 26, she met Karl Jeraj, a violinist with the Vienna Court Opera. They married and she moved back to Vienna.

Jeraj returned to Ljubljana to attend the teacher training college, graduating in 1895. She then took a job as a primary school teacher. She returned to Vienna and continued to write, including an increasing output for children. As part of the cultural scene in the Imperial capital, Jeraj wrote poetry that drew on her childhood experience of uncertainty. Her style reflected the literary modernism that was common at the time and was also informed by fairy tales and folklore, which gave her poetry a popularity amongst the Slovenian people, particularly in the emerging nationalism that led to the foundation of the Kingdom of Serbs, Croats and Slovenes. Some of her poems were put to music by her husband, particularly those which were aimed at children.

However, on 1 May 1906, her son died of scarlet fever. After this, her work became very sombre. Her writing covered adult subjects like war, and used the formal rhythms from folk tales to bring the reality of suffering to the readers. She also pulled in biblical themes, particularly of the challenge of retaining faith in midst of conflict. After the First World War, Jeraj moved to Purkersdorf, where she helped run a charity for those blinded in the conflict. In 1919, she moved back to Ljubljana when her husband was appointed to the newly founded Ljubljana Conservatory. She resumed writing for children, and helped found the Drustva Slovenkih Leposlovcev Socialnogospodarskega in Kulturnega Zenskega (Women's Social, Economic and Cultural Association of Slovenia).

Jeraj died on 1 May 1932. She was survived by three daughters, Vida, Maro and Oli.

== Selected writing ==
- Slutnje (Premonitions), Slovenka, 1897.
- Spomin ob Savi (Memory of the Savi). 1897.
- Mrtvemu pesniku Aleksandrovu I, II, (To the Dead Poet Aleksandrovu), 1901.
- Balada I (Ballad 1), 1904.
- Tam zunaj, tam daleč je moja mladost, Pojdi v sever (Out there, far away is my youth, Go north). 1908.
- Pri mojih durih čaka smrt (Death awaits at the door). 1908.
- Jezero mojih dni (Lake of my days), 1914.
