= Sveti Pavel =

Sveti Pavel may refer to:

- Prebold, a settlement in the Municipality of Prebold, Slovenia, known as Sveti Pavel pri Preboldu until 1952
- Šentpavel na Dolenjskem, a settlement in the Municipality of Ivančna Gorica, Slovenia, known as Sveti Pavel until 1955
- Sveti Pavel (novel), a novel by Pavle Zidar
