= List of Slovene novels =

A list of Slovene novels:

== 0-9 ==
- 5 do 12h

== A ==
- Abadon (novel)
- Alamut (1938 novel)
- Angie
- Aritmija (novel)
- Ata je spet pijan

== B ==
- Balerina, balerina
- Bela dama Devinska
- Bobri (novel)
- Boštjanov let

== C ==
- Čaj s kraljico
- Camera obscura (novel)
- Car brez zaklada
- Ciklamen
- Con brio (novel)

== D ==
- Deseti brat
- Devet fantov in eno dekle
- Distorzija
- Dnevnik Hiacinte Novak
- Drejček in trije Marsovčki

== F ==
- Fantje iz gline
- Filio ni doma
- Finta v levo
- Fužinski bluz

== G ==
- Gimnazijec (novel)
- Gluhota (novel)
- Gospodin Franjo
- Grenki med

== H ==
- Hiša groze
- Hiša Marije Pomočnice
- Hiša na meji (novel)

== I ==
- Ivan Erazem Tatenbah (novel)
- Izpred kongresa

== J ==
- Janov krik

== K ==
- Kapitanov ključ
- Keopsova piramida (novel)
- Kosmati predsednik
- Kralj ropotajočih duhov (novel)
- Kraljeva hči
- Kri na dlaneh

== L ==
- Ledene magnolije
- Leta milosti
- Leteči mački
- Ljubezen.si
- Ljubezni Sinjebradca
- Ljubezni tri in ena smrt
- Ločil bom peno od valov

== M ==
- Med dvema stoloma
- Menuet za kitaro
- Mladost na stopnicah
- Mlinarjev Janez: Slovenski junak ali uplemenitba Teharčanov
- Modri e
- Modrost starodavnega anka
- Mojster nebeške lepote
- Morje v času mrka
- Mrtvo morje (novel)
- Muriša

== N ==
- Na Žerinjah
- Ninina pesnika dva
- Norišnica

== O ==
- Obiskovalec
- Objestnost
- Od blizu
- Od RTM do WTF
- Odprava zelenega zmaja
- Odveč srce
- Otrok brez otroštva
- Otroške stvari
- Očeta Vincenca smrt

== P ==
- Pastorek (novel)
- Petelinji zajtrk (novel)
- Pod milim nebom
- Pod svobodnim soncem
- Popkorn (novel)
- Pot (Zaplotnik)
- Požganica
- Predmestje (novel)
- Prikrita harmonija
- Princ zelenih sanj
- Princeska z napako

== R ==
- Rheia
- Rokovnjači

== S ==
- Saga o Karantaniji, Kralj Samo
- Sarkofag (novel)
- Se spominjaš Afrike?
- Sedmi svet
- Seks, ljubezen in to
- Sekstant (novel)
- Sence v očesu
- Šesta knjiga sanj
- Slepi potnik
- Slovenski svetec in učitelj
- Smeh za leseno pregrado
- Šolen z brega
- Srebro iz modre špilje
- Sveti Pavel (novel)

== T ==
- Tango v svilenih coklah
- Teden dni do polne lune
- Telesni čuvaj (novel)
- Tito, amor mijo
- To noč sem jo videl
- Tri (novel)
- Triptih Agate Schwarzkobler
- Trnovska mafija
- Trnovska mafija drugič

== Z ==
- Zoo (novel)
- Žarometi (novel)
