= Trnovska mafija drugič =

1997 novel by Dim Zupan

- Author: Dim Zupan
- Language: Slovenian
- Series: Trnovska mafija trilogy
- Genre: Children's novel
- Publisher: Prešernova družba
- Publication date: 1997
- Publication place: Slovenia
- Media type: Hardcover
- Pages: 170
- ISBN: 9789616261012

Trnovska mafija drugič is a novel by Slovenian author Dim Zupan. It is the sequel to Zupan's 1992 novel, Trnovska mafija. It was first published in 1997. It is the second part of a trilogy, concluded with the novel Trnovska mafija – v tretje gre rado (2003).

== See also ==
- List of Slovenian novels
