= Con Brio =

Con Brio may refer to:

- Con brio, a musical direction, meaning "with spirit" or "with vigor"
- Con brio (Widmann), a composition by Jörg Widmann
- Con Brio (band), a funk band based in San Francisco
- Con Brio, Inc., a defunct synthesizer manufacturer
- Con Brio Records, a defunct record label
- Con brio (novel), a 1998 novel by Slovenian author Brina Švigelj-Mérat
