= Odveč srce =

2006 novel by Brina Švigelj Mérat

- Author: Brina Svit
- Language: Slovenian
- Genre: Novel
- Publisher: Cankarjeva založba
- Publication date: 2006
- Publication place: Slovenia
- Media type: Hardcover
- Pages: 220
- ISBN: 9789612315320

Odveč srce is a novel by Slovenian author Brina Svit. It was first published in 2006.

== Plot ==
The main heroine of the novel is Lila Sever, a blonde and tiny forty-four-year-old with two mothers, two homelands and also two loves. The novel is an intertwining of three stories: the frame story is a conversation between Lila and her best friend Simona. It takes place in Lila's apartment one morning after her return from Slovenia to Paris. The central story tells of Lila's several-month visit to Slovenia, where she first went to her father's funeral, but then stayed there much longer out of love. The third story, however, is the story of Lila's father, which Lila learns about through reading the book The Heart of the Redundant, which her father left her in order to learn more about her past.

The frame story is without special events: Lila, a perfume maker, and Simona, a top designer, sit down to breakfast and talk to each other only once when Lila asks Simona if she wants a glass of water. Simona is visiting at the request of Lila's husband Pierre, so that Lila can tell her the truth about her lover from Slovenia, but he doesn't tell her.

The central story goes back in time. After the call of her half-brother Izza, Lila travels to Slovenia due to her father's death. There she gets the keys to the old house in Bled and stays longer than she initially thought, as she gets involved in a romance with doctor Sergej. Forget about your life in Paris and completely indulge in the winter idyll in Bled, making love with Sergei, chatting with old Romanian Nast, feeding a black cat and reading your father's book. Thinking that Sergei has drowned in the lake, he returns to Paris only when Pierre comes to look for her.

In the third story, which Lila reads in the book, we get to know the love story of her father Matija, a distinguished and conservative professor and translator, who got married and entered into a passionate relationship with his student Vesna. The fruit of this love was Lila, who lived with her father, breadwinner and two half-brothers after the untimely death of her mother Vesna (she had an accident in the mountains when Lila was one year old).

== See also ==
- List of Slovenian novels
