= Finta v levo =

2002 novel by Ivan Sivec

- Author: Ivan Sivec
- Language: Slovenian
- Publication date: 2002
- Publication place: Slovenia

Finta v levo is a novel by Slovenian author Ivan Sivec. It was first published in 2002.

== See also ==
- List of Slovenian novels
