= Objestnost =

Slovenian novel

- Author: Jurij Hudolin
- Language: Slovenian
- Genre: Novel
- Publisher: Beletrina
- Publication date: 2005
- Publication place: Slovenia
- Media type: Hardcover, E-book
- Pages: 160
- ISBN: 978-961-242-028-4

Objestnost is a novel by Slovenian author Jurij Hudolin. It was first published in 2005.

== See also ==
- List of Slovenian novels
