= Šolen z brega =

1997 novel by Zoran Hočevar

- Author: Zoran Hočevar
- Language: Slovenian
- Series: Kresnik, Zelena
- Subject: Ljubljana, Independence of Slovenia, Satire, Family relations, Housing issues
- Genre: Social novel, satire, allegory
- Publisher: Založba / cf.
- Publication date: 1997
- Publication place: Slovenia
- Pages: 228
- Award: Kresnik Award (1998)
- ISBN: 9789616271004

Šolen z brega is a Social novel by Slovenian author Zoran Hočevar. It was first published in 1997.

== Reception and awards ==
The novel was critically well-received and was nominated for the Kresnik Award, which it won in 1998. One critic noted that the novel had been circulating among publishers for five years before it was finally published, expressing surprise that a "mildly ironic, humorous, witty" book with "undeniable literary weight" was overlooked for so long.

== See also ==
- List of Slovenian novels
