= Očeta Vincenca smrt =

1979 novel by Peter Božič

- Author: Peter Božič
- Language: Slovenian
- Publisher: Mladinska knjiga
- Publication date: 1979
- Publication place: Slovenia
- ISBN: 8611172159

Očeta Vincenca smrt is a novel by Slovenian author Peter Božič. It was first published in 1979.

== See also ==
- List of Slovenian novels
