= Fantje iz gline =

2005 novel by Janja Vidmar

- Author: Janja Vidmar
- Language: Slovenian
- Publication date: 2005
- Publication place: Slovenia

Fantje iz gline (Boys in Clay) is a novel by Slovenian author Janja Vidmar. It was first published in 2005. The novel deals in depth with the problem of different sexual orientations.

== Plot description ==
High school classmates Ajk and Mali have little in common - one is a muscular athlete, a bold breaker of girls' hearts, for whom schoolwork means little, the other is an artistic soul, non-competitive and very understanding. When Ajk gets into an argument with an art professor, Ajk's girlfriend asks Mai for help in writing a research paper on Michelangelo's David. The collaboration is complicated by Ajk's stubborn dislike of art and of his queer classmate, as well as by the homophobic rumors that spread through the school.

== See also ==
- List of Slovenian novels
