= Smeh za leseno pregrado =

2000 novel by Jani Virk

- Author: Jani Virk
- Language: Slovenian
- Publication date: 2000
- Publication place: Slovenia

Smeh za leseno pregrado is a novel by Slovenian author Jani Virk. It was first published in 2000.

== See also ==
- List of Slovenian novels
