= Angie (novel) =

2007 novel by Janja Vidmar

- Author: Janja Vidmar
- Language: Slovenian
- Publication date: 2007
- Publication place: Slovenia

Angie is a novel by Slovenian author Janja Vidmar. It was first published in 2007.

== See also ==
- List of Slovenian novels
