= Pod milim nebom =

2009 novel by Desa Muck

- Author: Desa Muck
- Language: Slovenian
- Publication date: 2009
- Publication place: Slovenia

Pod milim nebom is a novel by Slovenian author Desa Muck. It was first published in 2009.

== See also ==
- List of Slovenian novels
