= Aritmija =

Aritmija may refer to:

- Aritmija (novel), a 2004 novel by the Slovenian author Jani Virk
- Aritmija (album), a 2006 album by the Croatian band Vatra
