= Predmestje (novel) =

2002 novel by Vinko Möderndorfer

- Author: Vinko Möderndorfer
- Language: Slovenian
- Publication date: 2002
- Publication place: Slovenia

Predmestje is a novel by Slovenian author Vinko Möderndorfer. It was first published in 2002. It was later adapted by Möderndorfer into a film of the same name.

== See also ==
- List of Slovenian novels
