= Kapitanov =

Kapitanov may refer to

- Iliyan Kapitanov (born 1992), Bulgarian football player
- Kapitanov ključ, a novel by Slovenian author Ivan Sivec
