= Ljubezni Sinjebradca =

2005 novel by Vinko Möderndorfer

- Author: Vinko Möderndorfer
- Language: Slovenian
- Publication date: 2005
- Publication place: Slovenia

Ljubezni Sinjebradca is a novel by Slovenian author Vinko Möderndorfer. It was first published in 2005.

== See also ==
- List of Slovenian novels
