= Saga o Karantaniji, Kralj Samo =

Novel by Ivan Sivec

Saga o Karantaniji, Kralj Samo is a Slovenian novel by Ivan Sivec. It was first published in 2010.

== See also ==
- List of Slovenian novels
