= Zoo (Vidmar novel) =

2005 novel by Janja Vidmar

- Author: Janja Vidmar
- Language: Slovenian
- Publication date: 2005
- Publication place: Slovenia

Zoo is a novel by Slovenian author Janja Vidmar. It was first published in 2005.

== See also ==
- List of Slovenian novels
