= Pastorek =

Pastorek may refer to:

- Pastorek (novel), a 2008 novel by Slovenian writer Jurij Hudolin
- Pastorek (surname), a Slovak surname
