= Beno Zupančič =

Slovene writer and journalist

- Born: 22 March 1925; Sisak, Kingdom of Serbs Croats and Slovenes (now in Croatia)
- Died: 28 August 1980 (aged 55); Ljubljana, Socialist Federal Republic of Yugoslavia (now in Slovenia)
- Occupations: Writer; journalist; scriptwriter
- Writing career
- Notable works: Sedmina, Gramada,
- Notable awards: Prešeren Award; 1958 for his novel Sedmina

Beno Zupančič (22 March 1925 – 28 August 1980) was a Slovene writer and journalist. He is best known for his novels and youth literature.

Zupančič was born in Sisak, then part of the Kingdom of Serbs, Croats and Slovenes, now in Croatia. He went to school in Ljubljana and during the Second World War participated in the Slovene Liberation Front and was sent to a detainment camp as a result. He completed his studies after the war and then worked in publishing and as a politician.

In 1958 he won the Prešeren Award for his novel Sedmina. He was also president of the Slovene Writers' Association in the late 1950s.

The public library in Postojna is named after Zupančič.

== Selected works ==
- Sanje (1945)
- Štirje molčeči in druge zgodbe (1951)
- Veter in cesta (1954)
- Sedmina (1957)
- Mrtvo morje (1956)
- Meglica (1966)
- Plat zvona (1970)
- Potres (1971)
- Golobnjak (1972)
- Grmada (1974)

=== Youth prose ===
- Janez morski volk (1954)
- Deček Jarbol (1959)
- Koromindija doma (1971)
- 105 lubenic (1972)
- Luka (1981)
