= Modri e =

1998 novel by Matjaž Pikalo

- Author: Matjaž Pikalo
- Language: Slovenian
- Publication date: 1998
- Publication place: Slovenia

Modri e is a novel by Slovenian author Matjaž Pikalo. It was first published in 1998.

== Plot ==
The few-day story of the first-person narrator Alfred Pačnik is set in Kanal, where Alfred has just graduated from high school. His every day is full of complications, twists and turns, adventures and adventures, laughter and sadness. He is a boy who is bored with the speech of the principal and the awarding of graduation certificates. He likes his younger brother Benči, who accompanies him to kindergarten in the morning, but he doesn't like his classmate Fleischmance and the corrupt local policeman Petarda. There are the usual conflicts in his relationship with his older, adopted brother Best, but he also sees a role model in Best. Best is the best footballer in the local football club. Alfred is not used to comfort, as he comes from a working-class family. The mother is a hairdresser and the father works illegally in Austria because he is on hold at his home factory. The family lives in a small apartment in a factory block. Alfred doesn't even have his own room. At night, he shares the living room with his grandfather, who sleeps on a sofa bed, and Alfred puts his bed in the closet every day and puts it back in the evening. He earns extra money by delivering the newspaper in the afternoon, which is why he was nicknamed the Postman. He is in love with his brother's girlfriend Bilo, who tries to convince her with naive dreams that they are traveling to a lonely island. Alfred is troubled by a gang of three hooligans who are smashing and harassing the whole town. Alfred is once beaten and his front tooth is broken. Tired and fed up with his place, he wants to go to the world as soon as possible: somewhere in the jungle or Venus, as he says. Alfred thought of running away from home. He arms himself with a friend's father's gun, takes refuge in church for Mass and Confession, but because he remembers the afternoon's football club game against the violas, he heads to the stadium with his teacher. With his first love, football, everything settles down. With all the problems that plague him, with all the successes and failures he experiences, he takes refuge in the embrace of a kind of sanctuary of football, in his temple of peace and comfort, in the bar Modri e.

== See also ==
- List of Slovenian novels
