= Od RTM do WTF =

2008 novel by Asja Hrvatin

- Author: Asja Hrvatin
- Language: Slovenian
- Genre: Young adult novel
- Publisher: Mladinska knjiga
- Publication date: 2008
- Publication place: Slovenia
- Pages: 259
- ISBN: 9789610105138

Od RTM do WTF is a novel by Slovenian author Asja Hrvatin. It was first published in 2008.

== See also ==
- List of Slovenian novels
