= Princeska z napako =

1998 novel by Janja Vidmar

- Author: Janja Vidmar
- Language: Slovenian
- Publication date: 1998
- Publication place: Slovenia

Princeska z napako is a novel by Slovenian author Janja Vidmar. It was first published in 1998.

== See also ==
- List of Slovenian novels
