= Kapitanov ključ =

2004 novel by Ivan Sivec

- Author: Ivan Sivec
- Language: Slovenian
- Publisher: Založba Mladinska knjiga
- Publication date: 2004
- Publication place: Slovenia
- Pages: 249
- ISBN: 86-11-16784-8

Kapitanov ključ is a novel by Slovenian author Ivan Sivec. It was first published in 2004.

== See also ==
- List of Slovenian novels
