= Šesta knjiga sanj =

2006 novel by Dušan Merc

- Author: Dušan Merc
- Language: Slovenian
- Publication date: 2006
- Publication place: Slovenia

Šesta knjiga sanj is a novel by Slovenian author Dušan Merc. It was first published in 2006.

== See also ==
- List of Slovenian novels
