= Abadon (novel) =

1893 novel by Janez Mencinger

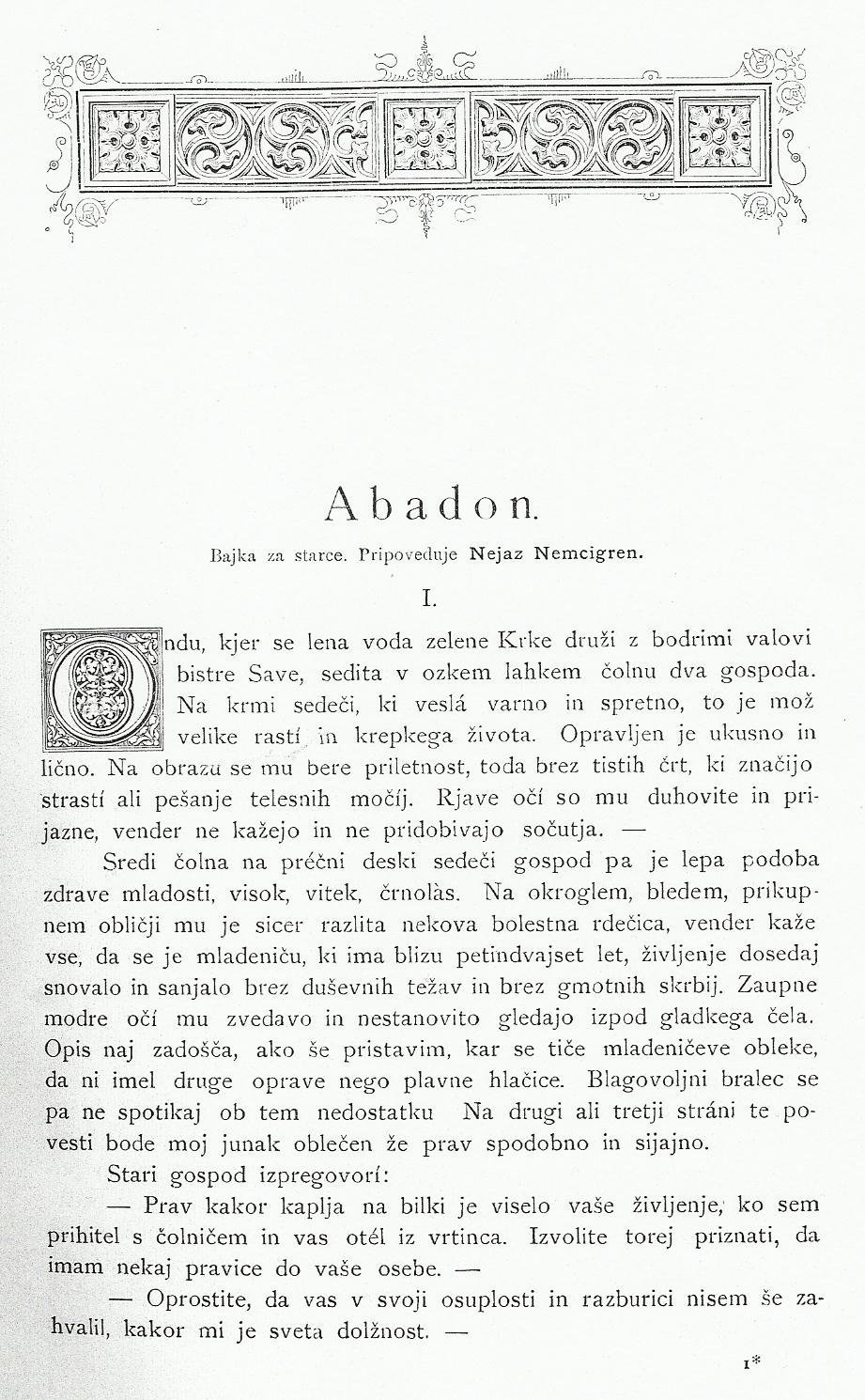
- First page from 1893 Ljubljanski zvon edition
- Author: Janez Mencinger
- Language: Slovenian
- Subject: Anti-utopian satirical novel
- Genre: Science fiction
- Publisher: Tiskovna zadruga
- Publication date: 1893
- Publication place: Slovenia
- ISBN: 9789612427

Abadon is a science fiction novel by Slovenian author Janez Mencinger. It was first published in 1893.

== Content ==
=== Renewal ===
Samorad Veselin is a student of rich parents from Kraljevec ob Sotli. He falls in love with Cvetana, a rich neighbor with whom he decides to marry. A month before the wedding, the lover becomes the victim of a gypsy and his mother, as the latter try to break up the love with a plot. Samorad, who is convinced that Cvetana will marry someone else, runs into the Sava vortices in a suicidal tendency, but is rescued unconscious. This is where his heat delusions begin.

In his delusions, he is rescued from the Sava waves by an old man who soon introduces himself as Abaddon, "an evil spirit of lies and deception, hypocrisy and injustice - the leading genius of the [...] age!" acquired Cvetano, concludes a contract with Abadon. He renounces four hours of sleep a day, is forbidden any contact with water, gets an invisible ring around his neck, and in return Abaddon serves him with all the supernatural powers at his disposal.

With the conclusion of the contract, Samorad begins an instructive journey through space and time, in which he learns how each use of Abadon's help hurts someone, what the future of Europe and the Slovenian nation will look like and what interpersonal relationships are. Samorad first returns home, where he learns of the death of his mother, who was blamed for his suicide attempt, and then, through Samorad's fault, Cvetan is accused of murdering his fiancé. In helplessness, Samorad leaves Dolenjska on a plane with Abadon and travels around Europe, where he meets stingy capitalists in Paris. Abaddon then shows him an image of the future, where utilitarian Asians rule Europe in the 24th century, witnessing the extinction of Slovenes. After returning to his time, he finds himself in America, where, through his and Abaddon's fault, Cvetan commits suicide. Samorad refuses Abaddon's help, impoverished finds himself in Chicago. A person who is Samorad's conscience enters the inn "Pri postenem Kranjcu", where he takes refuge, and persuades him to leave Abaddon. A fire breaks out in the inn, Samorad's conscience unites with his body, and in that, a jet of water from Samorad's fire hose liberates Abadon's authority.

At the end of the novel, the reader learns that all the events were Samorad’s delusion. He wakes up from the fever, accompanied by a doctor, Cvetana, his mother and classmate Živko Tratilek. He is told that he had incomprehensible delusions, which were written down, and at the same time the bookworm Nemcigren was asked to remove from the Samorad library all inappropriate books, "all the many degenerates of the boiling brain and the unpleasant greed of our nervous age."

=== An anti-utopian state of the 24th century ===
When Samorad leaves his body to Abaddon, he moves with the servant Plahtalič to the 24th century. During this period, Europe was occupied by Asians and turned into their colony. New Europe is ruled by totalitarianism, which is disillusioned. The state has deprived people of every form of freedom, power extends over all spheres of (private) life. From birth, people are divided according to the roles they will acquire in life. Every birth of a child is predetermined, only the most deserving people are chosen as parents, who have the right to live in a partnership until one day the authorities kill them. Children are immediately separated according to gender, girls are brought up for motherhood and work in guardianship institutions, and boys are directed to specialized forms of work that they will do later in life. Soon they put masks on their heads (masks are different colors, depending on the hierarchy of the future worker), which make it impossible to separate people from each other. When they finish school, the state distributes them to work areas, where they produce the resources necessary for the existence of the state in some factories. They are constantly prevented from communicating with each other, people live in isolation, and the state commands them to obey unconditionally. Any doubt about the immortality of their leader (the immortal ruler is at the head of the state) and free thinking are strictly forbidden under the threat of the death penalty. To this end, the state has developed a “chair of obvious confession,” a chair in which the accused cannot speak anything other than the truth. With the help of a chair, every spark of free thinking is suppressed already in the mud, so the country is internally homogeneous.

The 24th century state is the antithesis of the 19th century state. Plahtalič justifies such a state as a consequence of the social demands of the 19th century, when the individual demanded unlimited freedom and rights for himself, and unlimited duty for the state. Because the two are incompatible, the state has retained only its duty to the people, sacrificing freedom and justice to that end.

== See also ==
- List of Slovenian novels
