= Mrtvo morje =

1956 novel by Beno Zupančič

- Author: Beno Zupančič
- Language: Slovenian
- Publication date: 1956
- Publication place: Slovenia

Mrtvo morje is a novel by Slovenian author Beno Zupančič. It was first published in 1956.

== See also ==
- List of Slovenian novels
