= Muriša =

2006 novel by Feri Lainšček

- Author: Feri Lainšček
- Translator: Erica Johnson Debeljak
- Language: Slovenian
- Genre: Novel, historical, family saga
- Publisher: Študentska založba
- Publication date: 2006
- Publication place: Slovenia
- Pages: 225
- ISBN: 9789612420758

Muriša is a novel by Slovenian author Feri Lainšček. It was first published in 2006.

== Translations ==
- English, translated by Erica Johnson Debeljak, ISBN 978-9616995108

== See also ==
- List of Slovenian novels
