= Sekstant =

Slovenian novel

- Author: Štefan Kardoš, Norma Bale, Robert Titan Felix
- Language: Slovenian
- Publication date: 2002
- Publication place: Slovenia

Sekstant is a Slovenian novel. It was first published in 2002.

== See also ==
- List of Slovenian novels
