= Ninina pesnika dva =

1995 novel by Bogdan Novak

- Author: Bogdan Novak
- Language: Slovenian
- Publisher: Mladinska knjiga
- Publication date: 1995
- Publication place: Slovenia
- ISBN: 978-86-11-16219-5

Ninina pesnika dva is a novel by Slovenian author Bogdan Novak. It was first published in 1995.

== See also ==
- List of Slovenian novels
