= Pot (novel) =

1981 novel by Nejc Zaplotnik

- Author: Nejc Zaplotnik
- Language: Slovenian
- Publication date: 1981
- Publication place: Slovenia

Pot is a novel by Slovenian author and climber Nejc Zaplotnik (1952–1983). It was first published in Ljubljana, then part of Yugoslavia, in 1981. The book narrates, in a novelized way, Zaplotnik's life and experiences as an alpinist in postwar Slovenia, culminating in the ascension of both Makalu and Everest. Zaplotnik died two years after the book's publication in an avalanche while climbing Manaslu at age 31.

Pot is translated as "the Way" or "the Path". In it, Zaplotnik writes, "He who seeks a goal will remain empty when he reaches it, but he who finds a way will always carry the goal within himself".

The book has had a long resonance for alpinists, and Slovenian climbers specifically. Marko Prezelj has described the book as an early "bible" that inspired his climbing aspirations.

== See also ==
- List of Slovenian novels
