= Kri na dlaneh =

2004 novel by Slovenian author Robert Titan Felix

- Author: Robert Titan Felix
- Language: Slovenian
- Publication date: 2004
- Publication place: Slovenia

Kri na dlaneh is a novel by Slovenian author Robert Titan Felix. It was first published in 2004.

== See also ==
- List of Slovenian novels
