= Sedmi svet =

2009 novel by Sebastjan Koleša

- Author: Sebastjan Koleša
- Language: Slovenian
- Publication date: 2009
- Publication place: Slovenia

Sedmi svet is a novel by Slovenian author Sebastjan Koleša. It was first published in 2009.

== See also ==
- List of Slovenian novels
