= Boštjanov let =

2003 novel by Florjan Lipuš

- Language: Slovenian
- Publication date: 2003
- Publication place: Slovenia

Boštjanov let is a novel by Slovenian author Florjan Lipuš. It was first published in 2003.

== See also ==
- List of Slovenian novels
