= Princ zelenih sanj =

2007 Slovenian fantasy novel

Princ zelenih sanj (Prince of Green Dreams) is a Slovenian parallel romance fantasy novel by Marjetke Jeršek. It was released in 2007 by Stella. The main characters, Alesta and Ned, are lovers, who have many adventures through their exploration of parallel realities. The book features numerous fantasy elements such as elves, magical fairies and magic stones.

== See also ==
- List of Slovenian novels
