= Ločil bom peno od valov =

2003 novel by Feri Lainšček

- Author: Feri Lainšček
- Language: Slovenian
- Publisher: Študentska založba
- Publication date: 2003
- Publication place: Slovenia
- Pages: 317
- ISBN: 978-961-6446-31-0

Ločil bom peno od valov (I Will Separate the Foam from the Waves) is a novel by Slovenian author Feri Lainšček. It was first published in 2003.

== See also ==
- List of Slovenian novels
