= Devet fantov in eno dekle =

Book by Gitica Jakopin

- Author: Gitica Jakopin
- Language: Slovenian
- Publication date: 1963
- Publication place: Slovenia

Devet fantov in eno dekle is a novel by Slovenian author Gitica Jakopin.

== Plot ==
The story takes place during the World War II in a place along the Sava and is built in two parts.

Before Ivan said goodbye to his girlfriend Majda, he contemplated about the secret operation they would perform that day. He then went to the train station to wait for Angelo, who was supposed to bring explosives for their campaign. But Angela didn't show up. So he headed towards the tent where they were gathering with rebel friends. Angela arrived by a later train because she had to avoid a pursuer in the city. Ivan was not waiting for her at the station, so she went to the barber shop to ask Milan for help. But there was a German soldier whom Angela found suspicious. In all the confusion as she tried to save herself, she forgot her briefcase with the explosive on the barber table, and successfully reached the tent herself. Nine boys and one girl, aged between sixteen and twenty-one, huddled here in the evening. There was a raging storm outside. Majda jumped into the tent and warned them that the Germans had been looking for them all day. She suggested that they run away as soon as possible, but at the same time she wanted Ivan to stay with her. She told him she was pregnant, but he nonetheless decided to give up his beliefs and fight the occupier and ran away with the boys and Angela. They were soon captured by German soldiers.

In the second part, Metka tells the story. Four SS soldiers were housed in their house, so Metka had to sleep on a sofa in her parents' room. The parents were afraid that they would be relocated and that they would lose all their property. The father wanted Metka to study for the German exam, which all the children had to pass if they wanted to continue their education. Metka did not want to study, so she could not answer the question on the exam. However, everyone passed the exam. A few days later, towards evening, soldier Müller called Metka to the airfield to answer a difficult question about life and death in front of the gathered company. When Metka answered correctly, Müller was very pleased to win the bet. The colonel's remark about the stupidity of the Balkans greatly upset Metka's father, who swept everything he had achieved from the table in front of him with a swing.

One morning, a completely changed Müller returned home. At night, Metka's father told his mother that the Germans had captured nine boys and one girl. They were interrogated and tortured all day and all night, but no one said anything. They were then taken to the forest, where they dug their own graves, and the Germans shot them into it. Müller was in command. One of the boys did not want to fall, he was shot by three, and he was still standing. So Müller shot him up close and before he fell, the boy looked at him mockingly. They then leveled the ground so that this grave would never be found. In the morning, it message was found written on the chestnut tree in front of the house: "Any resistance to the existing administrative order would be punished immediately".

== See also ==
- List of Slovenian novels
