= Otrok brez otroštva =

2009 autobiographical novel by Franc Šetinec

- Author: Franc Šetinec
- Language: Slovenian
- Subject: Slovenes, Exiles, World War II, Memoirs
- Genre: Documentary literature
- Publisher: Viharnik
- Publication date: 2009
- Publication place: Slovenia
- Media type: Hardcover
- Pages: 125
- ISBN: 978-961-6057-73-8

Otrok brez otroštva is an autobiographical novel by the Slovenian author Franc Šetinec. It was first published in 2009.

== Content ==
The Šetinc family lived in the village of Mihalovec near Dobova during the Second World War. One morning Franc saw a truck turn onto the road towards their house. He was aware that now it was their turn to evict. They were taken to the Rajhenburg concentration camp, where they took an oval plate with a number. They were then settled in Striegau, Emigrant Camp 122. Franc was often hungry for various antics, as food stamps were taken from him. The children had to work hard, and they were also sent to work for the farmers. Franc thus became a horseman in Pasje polje. He helped the farmer with the horses and so he got a lot to eat. After a while, he had to return to the camp as he would have to move to another camp with his family. Franc, who was employed in an armature factory, does not leave the camp but is offered a job by entrepreneur Otto Opitz. Unfortunately for him, his family is transferred to the Grüssav camp. Thus Franc awaits the end of the war separately from his family.

== See also ==
- List of Slovenian novels
