= Med dvema stoloma =

1876 novel by Josip Jurčič

- Author: Josip Jurčič
- Language: Slovenian
- Publication date: 1876
- Publication place: Slovenia

Med dvema stoloma (Between Two Chairs) is a novel by Slovenian author Josip Jurčič. It was first published in 1876.

== See also ==
- List of Slovenian novels
