= Hiša groze =

Novel by Janje Vidmar

- Author: Janje Vidmar
- Language: Slovenian
- Publication date: 2000
- Publication place: Slovenia

Hiša groze is a novel by Slovenian author Janje Vidmar. It was first published in 2000.

== Synopsis ==
Jošt's mother died, his father completely forgot about him in emotional pain, so Jošt was first forced to find himself in a house haunted by the evil witch Maya and waiting to get the heart of a little boy in exchange for the heart of his son, who was also burned at the stake along with her. One day, Jošt's father goes on a business trip and provides the frightened Jošt with bodyguard Paja. Together with her friend Izije, she and her boyfriend have different plans, and neither Pajo nor Izi know that time is running out for the witch Maya, who must get Jošta into her hands as soon as possible. The girl Maja also plays an important role, through which we learn that the story that is taking place is not new, but a version of the story of the boy Gala is somehow repeated. But despite all the shocking, unusual and scary things that are happening in this house, we are just waiting for a happy ending.

== See also ==
- List of Slovenian novels
