= Tango v svilenih coklah =

2002 novel by Ted Kramolc

- Author: Ted Kramolc
- Language: Slovenian
- Series: Zbirka Samorog
- Genre: Novel
- Publisher: Nova revija
- Publication date: 2002
- Publication place: Slovenia
- Pages: 293
- ISBN: 9789616352420

Tango v svilenih coklah is a novel by Slovenian author Ted Kramolc. It was first published in 2002.

== See also ==
- List of Slovenian novels
