= Landscape No. 2 =

- Directed by: Vinko Möderndorfer
- Written by: Vinko Möderndorfer
- Distributed by: Forum Ljubljana
- Release date: 2008
- Running time: 90 minutes
- Country: Slovenia
- Language: Slovene

Landscape No. 2 (Slovene: Pokrajina št. 2) is a 2008 Slovenian film directed by Vinko Möderndorfer. The film appeared at the 65th Venice International Film Festival. It won the best film award at the 11th Slovenian Film Festival.

The film deals with crimes by the Yugoslav Partisans in 1945 in post-World War II Slovenia.
