= Slovenski svetec in učitelj =

1886 novel by Josip Jurčič

- Author: Josip Jurčič
- Language: Slovenian
- Publication date: 1886
- Publication place: Slovenia

Slovenski svetec in učitelj is a novel by Slovenian author Josip Jurčič. It was first published in 1886.

== See also ==
- List of Slovenian novels
