= Ivan Erazem Tatenbah =

Book by Josip Jurčič

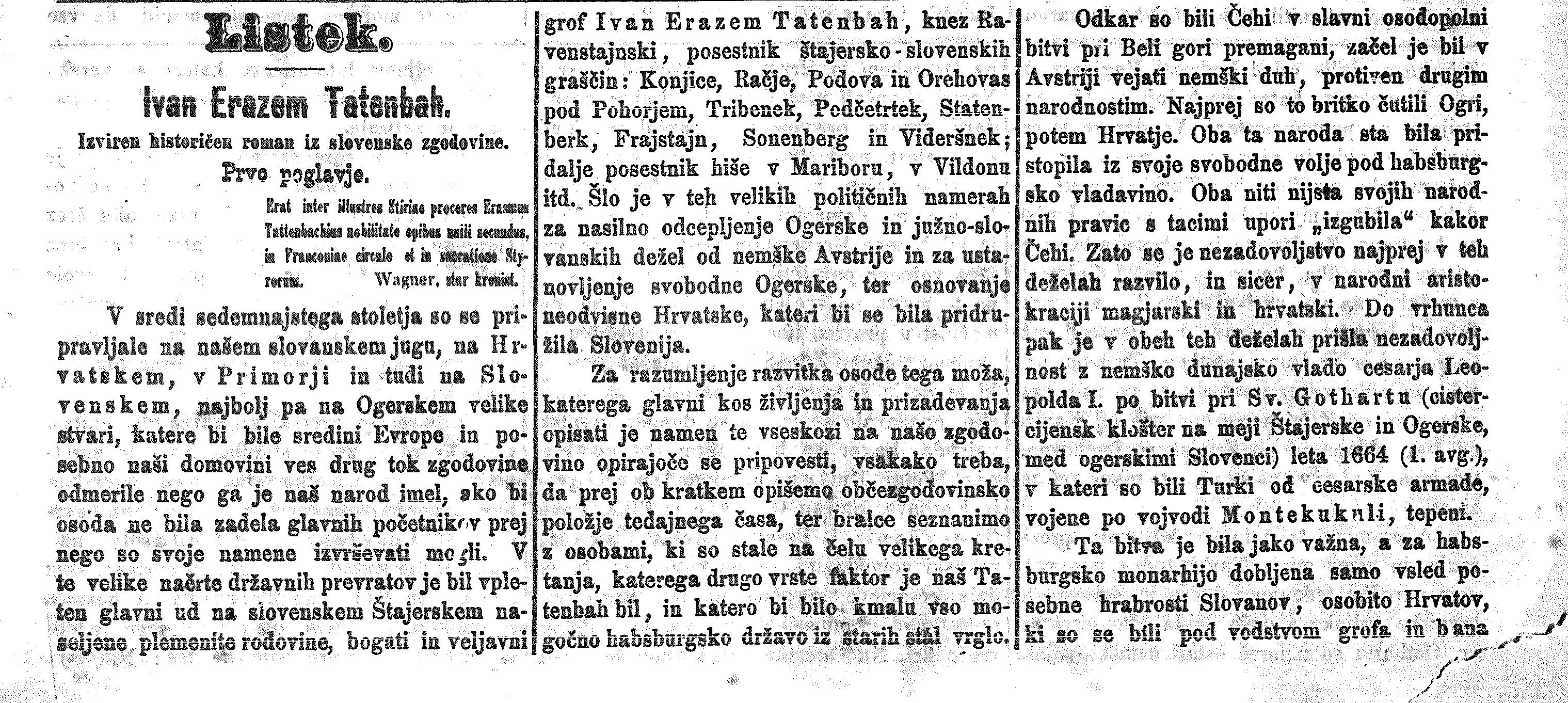
- Language: Slovenian
- Publication place: Slovenia

Ivan Erazem Tatenbah is a historical novel by the Slovenian author Josip Jurčič. It was first serialized as a feuilleton in the newspaper Slovenski narod starting January 1, 1873.

== Content ==
The story is set in the mid-17th century, a time of significant events on the Croatian, Slovenian, and Hungarian lands, marked by a violent attempt to secede from Austria. The conspiracy was led by the Croatian ban, Petar Zrinski, with support from his wife Anka Katarina Zrinska and her brother Franjo Krsto Frankopan. Zrinski found support in Slovenia through Count Hans Erasmus von Tattenbach.

The narrative follows Jurij Gornik, a winemaker on Tattenbach's vineyard, who prepares a feast for the nobility. He sends his beautiful daughter to a remote cottage. The guests arrive, including priests, mayors, peasants, and the count with his entourage, all treated with forced friendliness. After the guests leave, the count complains about the pretense, noting they will stay overnight. Meanwhile, Marjanica is in the cottage; when her lover Ribelj, the count's clerk, arrives, she is angry about being confined, but he consoles her, saying the world is corrupt and it is better she remain hidden. They part ways. The count's party drinks and sings, with the girls barely resisting his advances. After the others leave, the conspirators Bukovački and Caldi discuss matters; Caldi is frustrated by the count's inconsistency—supporting the plot one moment and not the next. They decide to exploit Tattenbach's fear of witches. The next morning, during their journey, they hear a scream. It is Marjanica, who came close out of curiosity but was frightened by a dog. The count sees she is a beautiful girl and orders her father to move with her to his Podčetrtek castle to keep them closer.

Above Konjice lies Tattenbach's castle, where the countess resides, neglected by her husband. The count arrives, initially kind to his wife but soon pushes her away. She is saddened, realizing his ambition drives him from her. He rejects her, believing she does not support his path to success. With Bukovački and Caldi, he rides to Ptujsko Polje, where an old woman named Grgulja, a fortune-teller, lives in a hut. His companions convince him to have his fortune told; she predicts his future and warns him not to break friendships, or he will be hanged. The count is frightened, and Bukovački and Caldi are pleased.

Preparations for the uprising intensify. To further convince Tattenbach, Katarina Zrinska visits him. During their talk, the countess enters, but Tattenbach rudely dismisses her. This disturbs Zrinska, who leaves the same day, while the count heads to Podčetrtek, where the beautiful Marjanica resides. There, Marjanica tends to flowers; Ribelj approaches, but her heart does not leap with joy - only tears come, a sign of guilt. Ribelj goes to her, but the count appears, claiming the girl is now his, with Ribelj to follow later. In a rage, Ribelj attacks the count; he is bound and taken as a prisoner to Konjice Castle.

Days later, Celje judge Pavel Ahác arrives at the castle, having learned of Ribelj's imprisonment. He wishes to speak with the young man but is denied. The judge plans to negotiate with the count and return later. The caretaker, worried, informs the count. By March, rumors of major events spread, fueled by Zrinski's soldiers arriving in Styria. The count believes this is necessary - the land must be known to the soldiers - planning to seize Graz through deceit.

Ribelj is released from prison with a large sum of money and a promise to remain silent about the plot and leave the country. Before departing for Germany, he wants to see the girl, forgive her, and take her with him. He arrives at the castle but learns she died of fever, worried he hadn't forgiven her. The count is absent after the beating. Ribelj soon goes to Maribor city clerk Jakob Koder, bringing a document signed by Zrinski, Frankopan, and Tattenbach - the original pact of rebellion against the emperor - to destroy Tattenbach. However, Koder has Ribelj arrested too. Later that month, nobles are summoned to a meeting in Graz, including Tattenbach. As the count enters the castle hall, soldiers seize him, charging him with high treason and sending him to prison.

Ribelj's letter confirms suspicions of the plot on Vienna. The count's property is confiscated. Within three days, a commission is formed, and trials begin. Tattenbach is imprisoned for a year, aided only by his wife Ana (who is later captured) and Captain Caldi. The day of sentencing arrives; the count and his descendants lose their nobility and estates. In his cell, he meets Countess Zrinska once more. In November, the verdict is read, he is no longer a noble, to be tried by the city court. At the town hall, he bids farewell to his son Anton. On December 1, his head is severed. Other conspirators, including Zrinski and Frankopan, are also executed. The countess receives a pension, Zrinska dies imprisoned in a Carmelite convent, and son Anton is forced into a monastery. They also decide to find Grgulja, but it is unclear if she was located.

== See also ==
- List of Slovenian novels
