= Modrost starodavnega anka =

2000 novel by Aksinja Kermauner

- Author: Aksinja Kermauner
- Language: Slovenian
- Publication date: 2000
- Publication place: Slovenia

Modrost starodavnega anka (English: The Wisdom of the Ancient Ankh) is a novel by Slovenian author Aksinja Kermauner. It was first published in 2000.

It is a children's adventure novel that blends elements of historical fiction and fantasy, focusing on themes of history, culture, environmental responsibility, and the interconnectedness of human civilization.

== See also ==
- List of Slovenian novels
