= Sence v očesu =

Novel by Matjaž Zupančič

- Author: Matjaž Zupančič
- Language: Slovenian
- Publication date: 2000
- Publication place: Slovenia

Sence v očesu is a novel by Slovenian author Matjaž Zupančič. It was first published in 2000.

== See also ==
- List of Slovenian novels
