= Srebro iz modre špilje =

2003 novel by Slavko Pregl

- Author: Slavko Pregl
- Language: Slovenian
- Genre: Young adult fiction, adventure novel
- Publisher: Mladinska knjiga Založba
- Publication date: 2003
- Publication place: Slovenia
- Media type: Hardcover, E-book
- Pages: 220
- Awards: Večernica (2004)
- ISBN: 9788611165660

Srebro iz modre špilje is a novel by Slovenian author Slavko Pregl. It was first published in 2003.

== See also ==
- List of Slovenian novels
