= Hiša na meji =

2003 novel by Lucijan Vuga

- Author: Lucijan Vuga
- Language: Slovenian
- Publication date: 2003
- Publication place: Slovenia

Hiša na meji (The House on the Border) is a historical novel by Slovenian author Lucijan Vuga. It was first published in 2003 and was made into a film of the same name in 2004.

The novel tells the story of an Italian-Slovenian priest and his life in the ethnically mixed area between Friuli and Posočje.

== See also ==
- List of Slovenian novels
