= Slepi potnik =

1999 Slovenian novel

- Author: Dušan Merc
- Language: Slovenian
- Publication date: 1999
- Publication place: Slovenia

Slepi potnik is a novel by Slovenian author Dušan Merc. It was first published in 1999. In Slovenian, “slepi potnik” means ‘stowaway’, although it literally to ‘blind passenger’.

== See also ==
- List of Slovenian novels
