= Ljubezen.si =

2006 novel by Mojca Rudolf

- Author: Mojca Rudolf
- Language: Slovenian
- Publication date: 2006
- Publication place: Slovenia

Ljubezen.si is a novel by Slovenian author Mojca Rudolf. It was first published in 2006.

== Plot ==
Anja and Andraž are thirteen-year-old teenagers who have the same problem; love. Both are wondering how to deal with this new emotion, what to do, how to approach the other person and reveal their feelings to him/her.

Soon at the beginning, we learn that Anja's first love is Andraž, but she doesn't tell anyone, not even her best friend Lili. She decides to reveal her love to Andraž at the school dance, as she is sure that he feels the same way about her. However, at the end of the dance, he experiences a shock; Andraž does not like her, but her friend Lili, who reciprocates this feeling. Anja is first furious, feels betrayed and never wants to see Lili again. However, the very next day she finds out that her friend is sincerely in love, that Lili did not betray her, as she did not know about her crush on Andraž. She decides not to confess her love to Andraž and tries to forget him. Tilen helps her with this. Unfortunately, things get complicated again; Rok, who also knows Anja's secret, only accidentally reveals it.

Because the children behave smartly, talk and resolve the problem, they remain friends.

== See also ==
- List of Slovenian novels
