= Marjetka Jeršek =

Slovenian novelist

Marjetka Jeršek is a Slovenian novelist.

== Works ==
- Teden dni do polne lune (1988)
- Dišave ognja (1989)
- Smaragdno mesto (1991)
- Kariatidino srce (1992)
- Vetru sprememb (1995)
- Svet čarovnije besed (1996)
- Akvamarinski prehod (1997)
- Eliksir (2000)
- Knjiga urokov (2000)
- Energija videnja (2001)
- KanDeLar (2002)
- KanDeLar Dve (2004)
- Viši so vilinske miši (2007)
- Totemske živali (2007)
- Princ zelenih sanj (2007)
- Nirulan (2007)
- Čari pisav (2007)
- KanDeLar – ponatis (2008)
- Aoraum (2010)
- Vetra Naliv in Knjiga strupov (2016) (source: NUK)
- Imenitnost spremembe - založba Stella (source: NUK)
- Zapiski o Parasvetu: založba Stella (source: NUK)
- V objemu povezav (2000) (source:NUK)
