= Gospodin Franjo =

1913 novel by Fran Maselj

- Author: Fran Maselj
- Language: Slovenian
- Publication date: 1913
- Publication place: Slovenia

Gospodin Franjo is a novel by Slovenian author Fran Maselj (pen name: Podlimbarski). It was first published in 1913. The author incorporates an overt message in support of Yugoslav union by having his protagonist sympathize with Slovenian culture and come to hate the boorish occupiers in Austrian-occupied Bosnia.

== See also ==
- List of Slovenian novels
