= Kosmati predsednik =

2010 novel by Matjaž Podlogar

- Author: Matjaž Podlogar
- Language: Slovenian
- Publication date: 2010
- Publication place: Slovenia

Kosmati predsednik is a novel by Slovenian author Matjaž Podlogar. first published in 2010.

== Plot ==
The novel humorously depicts a dog elected as president of a country, exploring the absurdity of politics through the animal’s unconventional leadership.

== See also ==
- List of Slovenian novels
