= Seks, ljubezen in to =

2006 novel by Andrej Morovič

- Author: Andrej Morovič
- Language: Slovenian
- Publication date: 2006
- Publication place: Slovenia

Seks, ljubezen in to is a novel by Slovenian author Andrej Morovič. It was first published in 2006.

== See also ==
- List of Slovenian novels
