= Trnovska mafija =

1992 novel by Dim Zupan

- Author: Dim Zupan
- Language: Slovenian
- Publication date: 1992
- Publication place: Slovenia

Trnovska mafija is a novel by Slovenian author Dim Zupan. It was first published in 1992.

== See also ==
- List of Slovenian novels
