= Tri (novel) =

Novel by Peter Zupanc

- Author: Peter Zupanc
- Language: Slovenian
- Publication date: 2001
- Publication place: Slovenia

Tri is a novel by Slovenian author Peter Zupanc. It was first published in 2001.

== See also ==
- List of Slovenian novels
