= Leteči mački =

1997 novel by Dim Zupan

- Author: Dim Zupan
- Language: Slovenian
- Publication date: 1997
- Publication place: Slovenia

Leteči mački (Flying Cats) is a novel by Slovenian author Dim Zupan. It was first published in 1997.

== See also ==
- List of Slovenian novels
