= Triptih Agate Schwarzkobler =

1968 novel by Rudi Šeligo

- Author: Rudi Šeligo
- Language: Slovenian
- Genre: 'Modernist prose', 'Existential fiction'
- Publication date: 1968
- Publication place: Slovenia
- Media type: Hardcover
- Pages: 119
- ISBN: 9789610152590

Triptih Agate Schwarzkobler (The Triptych of Agatha Schwarzkobler) is a novel by Slovenian author Rudi Šeligo. It was first published in 1968. Slovene Studies noted the "powerlessness of the modern subject", saying that the main character Agata is "treated as an object."

== See also ==
- List of Slovenian novels
