= Car brez zaklada =

2009 novel by Slavko Pregl

- Author: Slavko Pregl
- Language: Slovenian
- Genre: Teen novel, Young adult novel
- Publisher: Založba Goga
- Publication date: 2009
- Publication place: Slovenia
- Media type: hardcover
- Pages: 165
- ISBN: 978-961-6421-74-4
- OCLC: 449654853

Car brez zaklada is a novel by Slovenian author Slavko Pregl. It was first published in 2009.

== Synopsis ==
Lenart, the central character of Pregl's novel, has just completed his first year of high school in metallurgy. During the summer holidays, he gets a job as a scavenger, for which he is well paid. His parents, initially surprised by his decision, support him.

On the first day of work, Lenart meets his new colleagues, driver Jernej and scavenger Avdo, who introduces him to the work. At work, he meets very unusual people who browse the garbage for their own survival. He soon meets the mysterious Mrs. Kramar, who welcomes Jernej and Avdo with a cup of coffee every week. Mrs. Kramar lives alone in the house and wants to tidy up her home before going to a nursing home. Lenart offers to help her clean up. He soon discovers, however, that the house hides real treasures that the old lady has long since forgotten she has. They were not forgotten by her granddaughter Maja, who regularly visits her grandmother. Her visits, however, are not so innocent. In addition to taking the forgotten money from her grandmother, she also hides drugs for resale in her house. Lenart does not agree with her doing, but Maja and his friends Žiga and Peter convince him that it is possible to make good money by reselling. The "business" flourishes, Lenart falls in love with Maja and she decides to give up this indecent act. Then Tom appears, convincing his friends to embark on this destructive journey for the last time. This time, however, the consequences are fatal, especially for Maya. He almost dies while trying drugs. Her mother decides to take her abroad as she wants to prevent her from contact with drugs and society. Lenart is powerless and desperate because he can't keep Maja by his side.

== See also ==
- List of Slovenian novels
