= Dnevnik Hiacinte Novak =

2003 novel by Aksinja Kermauner

- Author: Aksinja Kermauner
- Language: Slovenian
- Publication date: 2003
- Publication place: Slovenia

Dnevnik Hiacinte Novak is a novel by Slovenian author Aksinja Kermauner. It was first published in 2003.

== Plot ==
Hyacinth is a middle-aged divorcee who, one day after reading The Bridget Jones Diary, decided to start writing the diary herself. She is the mother of two growing adolescents, employed at the post office, where one day she meets a handsome real estate entrepreneur, Florjan Korošec. He gets involved in a love affair with him, which, after the "Undercover" mission, in which he and two friends, Hilda and Sara, try to expose Sarah's husband. During the action, Hiacinta meets Florjan, who later goes to the bar with the girls, where Sara tries to seduce him. Hyacinth, who meanwhile got a job at Florjan's company due to financial problems, jealously goes home, thinking that Florjan cheated on her. At the same time, she is tormented by the news that Florjan is married and that she may not be perfect herself, but the latter later turns out to be untrue. Sara continues her seduction game under the pretext that she wants to buy a seaside weekend where she could write in peace, even though she’s not really a writer at all. Hiacinta stands in her way, trying to get rid of her with a trick: she hides the money she stole from Florjan's safe in the trunk of her stoenka. When Hyacinth comes to work unsuspecting one day, Florjan and Sara and the police are waiting for her. She is accused of stealing money, but it later turns out that Sara is guilty of this crime, so she lands in prison and Florjan returns to Hyacinth.

== See also ==
- List of Slovenian novels
