= Teden dni do polne lune =

1988 novel by Marjetka Jeršek

- Author: Marjetka Jeršek
- Language: Slovenian
- Publication date: 1988
- Publication place: Slovenia

Teden dni do polne lune is a novel by Slovenian author Marjetka Jeršek. It was first published in 1988.

== See also ==
- List of Slovenian novels
