= Asja Hrvatin =

Slovene writer (born 1990)

- Born: 24 December 1990; Ljubljana, Slovenia
- Occupations: Writer and researcher
- Spouse: Mohamad Bilal
- Writing career
- Notable work: Od RTM do WTF
- Literary movement: Women's rights

Asja Hrvatin (24 December 1990) is a Slovene writer and researcher, best known for her novels.

== Life ==
Asja Hrvatin was born on 24 December 1990 in Ljubljana. She attended Tone Čufar Primary School in Ljubljana and later continued her education at Poljane Gymnasium. In the academic year 2009/2010, she enrolled at the Faculty of Social Work at the University of Ljubljana. She graduated in Social Work and recently obtained an MA in Gender Studies. She identifies as a feminist.

== Works ==
Hrvatin's first young adult novel is titled From RTM to WTF and explores the challenging theme of drug addiction. In April 2010, an article titled Democracy as a Substitute for Real Life was published in the Sobotna priloga Delo magazine. In the same year, she began writing her second novel, Lepe punce lepo bruhajo, which tackles the issue of bulimia.

== Books ==
- Od RTM do WTF, 2008
- Lepe punce lepo bruhajo, 2012

== Research ==
- Gibanje za ustvarjanje novih prostorov skupnega in skupnosti, 2013
- Borders of social work: detention centre in the light of citizenship, criminalisation and state power, 2014
- Begunke v medijih: arhetip begunke kot žrtve, 2017
