= Pastorek (novel) =

2008 novel by Jurij Hudolin

- Author: Jurij Hudolin
- Language: Slovenian
- Publication date: 2008
- Publication place: Slovenia

Pastorek is a Slovenian novel written by Jurij Hudolin. It was first published in 2008.

== See also ==
- List of Slovenian novels
