= Od blizu =

2004 novel by Irena Svetek

- Author: Irena Svetek
- Language: Slovenian
- Publisher: Študentska Založba
- Publication date: 2004
- Publication place: Slovenia
- Pages: 162
- ISBN: 978-961-6446-81-5

Od blizu is a novel by Slovenian author Irena Svetek. It was first published in 2004.

== See also ==
- List of Slovenian novels
