= I Saw Her That Night =

2010 novel by Drago Jančar

To noč sem jo videl
- Author: Drago Jančar
- Language: Slovenian
- Publication date: 2010
- Publication place: Slovenia

I saw Her That Night is set in Slovenia before and after the Second World War and centres on the life and disappearance of Veronika Zarnik, an independent-minded woman from Ljubljana’s upper-middle class society, and her husband, the wealthy businessman Leo Zarnik.

The novel is narrated through five different perspectives: Veronika’s former lover, an officer in the Royal Yugoslav Army; her mother; a German military doctor; a housekeeper employed by the Zarnik family; and a former Partisan. Each narrator recalls Veronika and the events surrounding her disappearance from a different position, gradually revealing the circumstances of her fate. Veronika herself is never given a narrative voice.

== See also ==
- List of Slovenian novels
