= Con brio (novel) =

1998 novel by Brina Švigelj-Mérat

- Author: Brina Švigelj-Mérat (Brina Svit)
- Language: Slovenian
- Genre: Love novel, satirical elements
- Publisher: Tiskovna zadruga (1997, serialized); Nova revija (1998, book)
- Publication date: 1998
- Publication place: Slovenia
- Media type: Print (paperback), serialized in Literatura
- Pages: 172
- ISBN: 9616017624

Con brio is a novel by Slovenian author Brina Švigelj-Mérat. It was first published in 1998.

== See also ==
- List of Slovenian novels
