= Žarometi (novel) =

1962 novel by Gitica Jakopin

- Author: Gitica Jakopin
- Language: Slovenian
- Publication date: 1962
- Publication place: Slovenia

Žarometi (The Headlights) is a novel by Slovenian author Gitica Jakopin. It was first published in 1962. The protagonist Tine is chauffeur to Rudi, a womanizing businessman, and longs for a more normal life.

== See also ==
- List of Slovenian novels
