= Bela dama Devinska =

2010 novel by Dušan Jelinčič

- First edition
- Author: Dusan Jelincic
- Language: Slovenian
- Genre: historical novel
- Publisher: Založba Sanje
- Publication place: Slovenia
- Media type: hardcover
- Pages: 220
- ISBN: 978-961-274-000-9

Bela dama Devinska is a novel by Slovenian author Dušan Jelinčič. It was translated from the original Italian (as La dama bianca di Duino) to Slovene in 2010.

== Synopsis ==
The beginning of Simer and Vida's romance was enchanted. After his father died, he was a diligent and hardworking young man who went to assist the fishermen, and she was a submissive young woman who assisted on the farm. They desired each other from the moment they met. It was too lovely to last, so the lord of Devine Castle stepped in. He married Vida and held her in his castle in addition to asserting his right to the first night. True love, however, knows no boundaries, so the lovers kept running into each other. They surrendered to their forbidden love in a cave above the sea. At the castle, Vida had a companion with the name of Sofia. She assisted Vida in overcoming challenges so that they could keep meeting with Simer. Sofia revealed to her the location of the castle's hidden entrance. Vida abandoned her love when she learned she was pregnant. She bid Simer farewell with a broken heart, but since real love never fades, their separation was not forever. Readers are introduced to ambush murders, revenge, and jealousy in the next few chapters.

The epilogue tells what happened after the lovers tragic ending. We realize that because of Vida and Simer, the individuals who loved them, still believe in unconditional love.

== See also ==
- List of Slovenian novels
