= Ledene magnolije =

2002 novel by Marjana Moškrič

- Author: Marjana Moškrič
- Language: Slovenian
- Publisher: Cankarjeva založba
- Publication date: 2002
- Publication place: Slovenia
- Pages: 116
- ISBN: 9789612312794
- OCLC: 1051673115

Ledene magnolije (meaning "Ice Magnolias") is a novel by Slovenian author Marjana Moškrič. It was first published by Cankarjeva založba in 2002. In 2005, the book was published in Croatian, translated by Vesna Mlinarec.

== Published editions ==
- Marjana Moškrič (2002). Ledene magnolije. Cankarjeva založba. ISBN 9789612312794.
- Marjana Moškrič (2005). Ledene magnolije. Mozaik knjiga. ISBN 9789531966030.

== See also ==
- List of Slovenian novels
