= Mladost na stopnicah =

1983 novel by Anton Ingolič

- Author: Anton Ingolič
- Language: Slovenian
- Genre: Young adult novel
- Publisher: Mladinska knjiga*
- Publication date: 1962
- Publication place: Slovenia
- Pages: 275
- ISBN: 978-9612262570

Mladost na stopnicah is a novel by Slovenian author Anton Ingolič. It was first published in 1983. The novel deals with the coming of age of a troubled youth who neglects his schoolwork and eventually decides to train as a car mechanic. He gets into trouble but is treated leniently.

== See also ==
- List of Slovenian novels
