= Tito, amor mijo =

2005 novel by Marko Sosič

- Author: Marko Sosič
- Language: Slovenian
- Genre: Coming-of-age fiction
- Publication date: 2005
- Publication place: Slovenia
- ISBN: 8862870744

Tito, amor mijo is a novel by Slovenian author Marko Sosič. It was first published in 2005 by the publisher Beletrina.

== See also ==
- List of Slovenian novels
