= 5 do 12h =

1998 novel by Lenart Zajc

- Author: Lenart Zajc
- Original title: 5 do 12h
- Translator: mladinski roman
- Language: Slovenian
- Subject: Teenagers, subcultures, violence, alcohol, love, social norms
- Genre: Youth novel
- Publisher: Mladinska knjiga, Založba Goga
- Publication date: 2007
- Publication place: Slovenia
- Pages: 313 (2007 ver)
- ISBN: 9-789-61642148-5

5 do 12h is a novel by Slovenian author Lenart Zajc. It was first published in 1998.

== Plot ==
The story is set at a time when Slovenia was still part of the common state of Yugoslavia. Jaka, a fourth-year high school student, is a sworn skinhead. He is believed to be an anarchist. At the heart of his life are parties until the early hours of the morning, socializing with friends and girlfriends, and fights. In most cases, these fights are caused by alcohol, which Jakov's team, Grega, Tork and Žagar, consume in large quantities. The consequences of such behavior are inevitable for the protagonist. He was expelled from school just before the end of his fourth year due to a large number of unjustified hours and reprimands. However, Jaka does not give up and decides to finish high school. He buries himself in books and studies all day. His friends help him with his studies, and his parents stand by his side all the time. Teachers allow him to take exams before the end of the school year and thus complete the year in front of other classmates. He now has plenty of time to think about his life. He slowly realizes that the violence is not going anywhere, that Lea, the girl he fell madly in love with, is not right for him, and he decides to enroll in history studies after serving his military service. The story has a happy ending as Jaka falls in love with Vanja, a longtime friend. So he finally finds the love he has been desperately looking for all along and eventually finds it where it has always been, right in front of his nose. Reading Zajc's novel, we realize that the representatives of various subcultures from the late 1980s, which we all feared and avoided, are quite ordinary people with their values, ideals, emotions and, after all, fears.

== See also ==
- List of Slovenian novels
