= Norišnica =

2004 novel by Andrej E. Skubic

- Author: Andrej E. Skubic
- Language: Slovenian
- Genre: Short prose
- Publisher: Beletrina
- Publication date: 2004
- Publication place: Slovenia
- Media type: Hardcover
- Pages: 220
- ISBN: 978-961-6446-61-7

Norišnica is a novel by Slovenian author Andrej E. Skubic. It was first published in 2004.

== Plot ==
The stories represent a dialogue between the present and the time fifteen years ago, marked by great change and national euphoria. The heroes express different views and put the individual and his search for happiness in the world that limits him at the forefront. In the end, a solution is presented that offers the possibility of getting out of the crampedness of the individual and trapped in the modern world. It is a family coexistence that transcends the feeling of being trapped.

== See also ==
- List of Slovenian novels
