= Obiskovalec =

1997 novel by Matjaž Zupančič

- Author: Matjaž Zupančič
- Language: Slovene
- Genre: Crime novel
- Publisher: DZS
- Publication date: 1997
- Publication place: Slovenia
- Media type: Hardcover
- Pages: 477
- Award: Kresnik Award
- ISBN: 86-11-17705-3

Obiskovalec is a crime novel by Slovenian author Matjaž Zupančič. It was first published in 1997.

== See also ==
- List of Slovenian novels
