= Morje v času mrka =

Novel by Mate Dolenc

- Author: Mate Dolenc
- Translator: Michael Biggins
- Language: Slovenian
- Genre: Novel, social novel
- Publisher: Študentska založba
- Publication date: 2000
- Publication place: Slovenia
- English publication date: February 21, 2019
- Pages: 244
- ISBN: 978-9616995535

Morje v času mrka is a novel by Slovenian author Mate Dolenc. It was first published in 2000.

The story is a homage to Hemingway's novel The Old Man and the Sea. After him, a film of the same name was made in 2008, directed by Jure Pervanje.

== See also ==
- List of Slovenian novels
