= Drejček in trije Marsovčki =

1961 novel by Vid Pečjak

- Author: Vid Pečjak
- Language: Slovenian
- Publication date: 1961
- Publication place: Slovenia

Drejček in trije Marsovčki is a novel by Slovenian author Vid Pečjak. It was first published in 1961.

== See also ==
- List of Slovenian novels
