= Otroške stvari =

2003 novel by Lojze Kovačič

- Author: Lojze Kovačič
- Language: Slovenian
- Genre: Novel
- Publisher: Študentska založba
- Publication date: 2003
- Publication place: Slovenia
- Pages: 350
- ISBN: 961-6446-24-X

Otroške stvari is a novel by Slovenian author Lojze Kovačič. It was first published in 2003.

== Synopsis ==
The novel describes the author's childhood in Basel, Switzerland. The story covers the period from 1928, which introduces the memory of birth, to 1939 or to the eleventh year of age, when Kovačič's family arrived in the Ljubljana suburbs along the Sava. The novel is based on convincingly presented memoirs with detailed outlines of spaces in which associative sensory flashes are involved. Very special is the author's formation of the child's mental and sensory perception, which takes place between a very complex reality and a blurred fantasy experience.

The novel begins with memories of life in the "baby basket", followed by a short retrospective of the time before birth, followed by a long series of incidents of the stubborn, inflexible, bright child Bubi, as he was called, and his family. He talks about illness, health resorts and school, which are by far the darkest experiences for Bubi, about family conflicts, which are so numerous in such a socially insecure situation, about a city that is hostile to foreigners, about Nazism, which is the reason for return to the father's homeland.

Kovačič's Bubi seeks refuge in the suburban world, revives it in his consciousness and attributes emotions to it. Inconsistency with the adult world, which the child understands in a very special way, pushes him into isolation, but at the same time puts him in front of challenges, forces him to search for and discover children's authentic, natural knowledge.

== See also ==
- List of Slovenian novels
