= Leta milosti =

2004 novel by Sebastijan Pregelj

- Author: Sebastijan Pregelj
- Language: Slovenian
- Publication date: 2004
- Publication place: Slovenia

Leta milosti is a novel by Slovenian author Sebastijan Pregelj. It was first published in 2004.

== See also ==
- List of Slovenian novels
