= Mlinarjev Janez: Slovenski junak ali uplemenitba Teharčanov =

1859 novel by Ferdo Kočevar

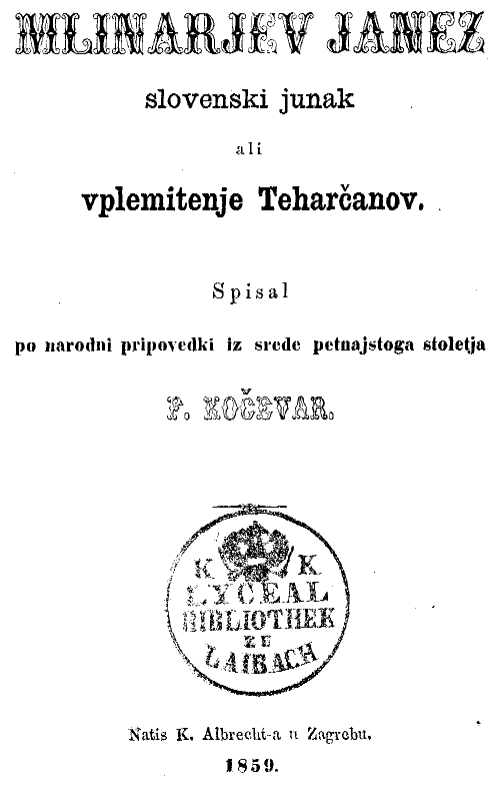
- Title page for Mlinarjev Janez: Slovenski junak ali uplemenitba Teharčanov (1859)
- Author: Ferdo Kočevar
- Language: Slovenian
- Publisher: D. Hribar
- Publication date: 1859
- Publication place: Slovenia
- Pages: 160
- Original text: Mlinarjev Janez: Slovenski junak ali uplemenitba Teharčanov at Slovenian Wikisource

Mlinarjev Janez: Slovenski junak ali uplemenitba Teharčanov is a novel by Slovenian author Ferdo Kočevar. It was first published in 1859.

== See also ==
- List of Slovenian novels
