= Sarkofag =

1997 novel by Dušan Merc

- Author: Dušan Merc
- Language: Slovenian
- Publication date: 1997
- Publication place: Slovenia

Sarkofag is a novel by Slovenian author Dušan Merc. It was first published in 1997.

== See also ==
- List of Slovenian novels
