= The Tenth Brother =

1866 novel by Josip Jurčič

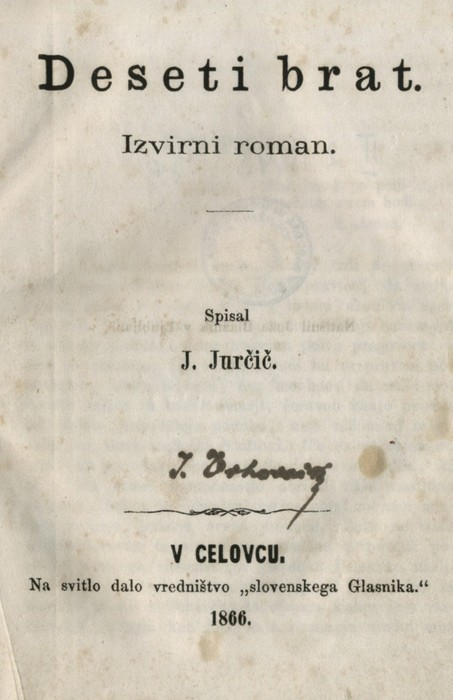
- The front page of The Tenth Brother
- Author: Josip Jurčič
- Original title: Deseti brat
- Language: Slovene
- Publication place: Slovenia

The Tenth Brother (Slovene: Deseti brat) a novel written by the Slovene writer Josip Jurčič, is the first novel in Slovene. It was first published in 1866 in Klagenfurt. The motif of “the tenth brother” derives from Slovenian folk tradition, reflecting the popular belief that the tenth child in a family brings misfortune, a theme also found in the folk song Desetnica (The Tenth Child).

The novel was adapted into a film of the same name in 1982.

== Summary ==
The Tenth Brother follows the life of Lovre Kvas, a young scholar, who has to somehow earn enough money to go to university in Vienna, and therefore accepts the position of a home-schooling teacher. He moves to a town called Slemenišče where he lives with a wealthy family. The family are the master and his wife, their twenty-three-year-old daughter Manica and their nine-year-old son, Balček. They are all very nice and Lovre starts to develop feelings for Manica. His newly made friend, Martinek Spak, who calls himself the tenth brother, supports their relationship. Marijan, a family friend who is also in love with Manica and always thought he would marry her someday, is very unhappy when he sees Lovre and Manica are in love. He gets into a fight with Martinek and ends up shooting him and is hit over the head with the shotgun in return. Martinek dies and Marijan's father, who was also the father of Martinek from a previous marriage, decides to tell Marijan the truth about his past. He then commits suicide. Because Marijan's father left his estate to Lovre, the latter can now return after being banned for his affair with Manica. The two get married and Marijan marries another woman so the story has a happy ending.

== Desetnica and deseti brat ==
There is an old tradition in some Slavic countries (that doesn't exist anymore) where if a couple has ten children of the same gender in a row, the tenth child has to leave. They then travel around the country and are said to possess supernatural abilities such as talking to animals and plants, being able to forecast the future ... If the tenth child is a girl, she is called "desetnica" (a word, derived from the word "ten" (deset)). If the child is a boy, he is called "deseti brat" (the tenth brother).

This motif has been illustrated in fiction many times, such as the Desetnica tale and the novel Deseti brat.

== See also ==
- List of Slovene novels

== Source and Literature ==
- Josip Jurčič. Deseti brat. Ljubljana: Mladinska knjiga, 1960 (Knjižnica Kondor, Izbrana dela iz domače in svetovne književnosti, 37).
- Boris Paternu. Jurčičev Deseti brat in njegovo mesto v slovenski prozi. V: Josip Jurčič. Deseti brat. Ljubljana: Mladinska knjiga, 1960 (Knjižnica Kondor, Izbrana dela iz domače in svetovne književnosti, 37). 206–220.
