= Balerina, balerina =

1997 novel by Marko Sosič

Balerina, balerina (Slovenian original)
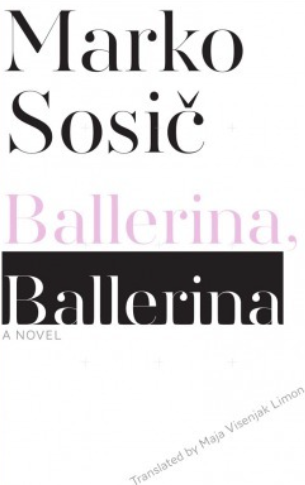
- Author: Marko Sosič
- Language: Slovenian
- Genre: Novel
- Publisher: (Original Slovenian publisher)
- Publication date: 1997
- Publication place: Slovenia
- Media type: Print (paperback)
- Pages: 132
- Award: Vstajenje (1997)

Balerina, balerina (English title: Ballerina, Ballerina: A Novel) is a novel by Slovenian author Marko Sosič. It was first published in Slovenian in 1997.

The novel is about a fifthteen year old girl who wets her bed every morning, signifying a new day. While the book is set in the 1960s where world advancements are happening every day (Such as the Vietnam War and the Moon landing), she believes her own little world filled with relationships are far more important. Her narrow-minded view of the world might just allow her to actually appericiate what truly matters in her life.

A French translation was published by Franco-Slovenes in 2013.

An English translation by Maja Visenjak Limon was published by Dalkey Archive Press in 2014.

== Awards ==
- Vstajenje Award (1997)
- Shortlisted for the Kresnik Award for best novel of the year (1998)
- Shortlisted for the Premio Strega Europeo 2007
- Included in the selection of 100 best Slavic novels

== See also ==
- List of Slovenian novels
