= Gluhota =

2001 novel by Jože Hudeček

- Author: Jože Hudeček
- Language: Slovenian
- Publication date: 2001
- Publication place: Slovenia

Gluhota is a novel by Slovenian author Jože Hudeček. It was first published in 2001. In 2002, it was nominated for Kresnik Award, the award for best novel of the year in Slovenia.
