= Sveti Pavel (novel) =

Novel

- First edition
- Language: Slovenian
- Subject: Rural life, Partisans, Post-war violence
- Genre: Historical novel, social-critical novel, rural novel
- Publisher: Založba Obzorja
- Publication place: Slovenia

Sveti Pavel is a novel by Slovenian author Pavle Zidar. It was first published in 1965.

== See also ==
- List of Slovenian novels
