= Pod svobodnim soncem =

1906 novel by Fran Saleški Finžgar

- Author: Fran Saleški Finžgar
- Language: Slovene
- Genre: historical novel
- Publisher: Dom in svet (v podlistkih), Katoliška bukvarna (v knjižni obliki, 2 zvezka)
- Publication date: 1906–1907
- Publication place: Duchy of Carniola

Pod svobodnim soncem: povest davnih dedov (Under the Free Sun: a Story of the Ancient Forefathers) is a historical novel by the Slovene writer Fran Saleški Finžgar. The work was initially published in 1906 and 1907 as a serial story in the conservative newspaper Dom in svet. It was published in the book form in 1912. It is an extensive narrative oeuvre with nationally motivated content.

== Story ==
The novel discusses the settlement of the Slavs in the Balkan Peninsula, when they still lived freely, not subjugated, and without a supreme leader. The novel includes a love story of Iztok, a Slavic warrior travelling to Constantinople (archaic Slovene: Bizanc) and Irena, a court woman there. It idyllically depicts the Slavs as pagans living in harmony with nature.

== Cultural references ==
- In 2004, a radio serial, written after the novel by the director Jože Vozny, was recorded by the Slovenian national radio. It was broadcast in summer 2016.
- In November 2016, the George Slatkonia Vocal Academy (mixed choir) from Novo Mesto in collaboration with a number of solo singers premiered an opera based on this novel in the city's cultural centre. It was written by the Slovene composer Tom Kobe (born 1988), and it featured the Italian tenor Domingo Stasi and the Croatian bariton Siniša Hapač.

== See also ==
- List of Slovenian novels
