= Aritmija (novel) =

2004 novel by Jani Virk

- Author: Jani Virk
- Language: Slovenian
- Publisher: Mladinska knjiga
- Publication date: 2004
- Publication place: Slovenia
- ISBN: 86-11-16793-7

Aritmija is a novel by Slovenian author Jani Virk first published in 2004 by Mladinska knjiga..

== Content ==
Klemen Jager, the owner of a successful advertising firm, is a refined man with a pleasant voice and a well-sculpted body. He has been married to Žana for fifteen years but regularly engages in sexual affairs with other women. The story prominently features a young journalist, Erna, and an Austrian woman, Ingrid. Throughout, he experiences recurring anxiety attacks and is haunted by the deaths of two close friends, despite regular gym visits, feeling that his body is letting him down. One day, while driving to a business dinner, he picks up a hitchhiker who turns out to be the daughter of his deceased friend Blaž from his student days. At her home in the Gorizia Hills, he gains an entirely new perspective on a world he had not known before. The ending is left open by the author.

== See also ==
- List of Slovenian novels
