= Jani Virk =

Slovene writer, poet, translator and editor

- Born: 4 March 1962 (age 64); Ljubljana, Socialist Federal Republic of Yugoslavia (now in Slovenia)
- Occupations: writer, poet, translator and editor
- Writing career
- Notable work: Pogled na Tycho Brache
- Notable awards: Prešeren Foundation Award; 1999 for Pogled na Tycho Brache

Jani Virk (born 4 March 1962) is a Slovene writer, poet, translator and editor. He writes poetry, short stories, essays, novels and scripts and translates from German into Slovene.

Virk was born in Ljubljana in 1962. He studied at the German and Comparative literature at the University of Ljubljana. During his studies, he worked in Chicago, London and Germany as a manual worker. In his youth, he trained for the Yugoslavian National Ski Team and he briefly worked as a ski coach. Later, he worked as an editor at the Literatura literary journal, the newspaper Slovenec and at the national broadcasting house. From 2010, he is the editor of the Drama department at RTV Slovenia.

In 1999 he won the Prešeren Foundation Award for his collection of short stories Pogled na Tycho Brache (A View of Tycho Brahe). In 2014, he completed a Doctorate Degree in German studies, where he researched the theme of the Middles Ages in film and literature.

== Published works ==
=== Short stories ===
- Preskok (The Jump Over), 1987
- Vrata in druge zgodbe (The Door and Other Stories), 1991
- Moški nad prepadom (Man Above the Abyss), 1994
- Izza potresa:novele (From Behind the Earthquake), 1995 (with Lela B. Njatin and Jože Hudeček)
- Pogled na Tycho Brache (A View of Tycho Brahe), 1998
- Med drevesi (Among the Trees), 2016
- Metulj v jantarju (Butterfly in the amber), 2023

=== Poetry ===
- Tečeva čez polje (We Run Across the Field), 1990

=== Essay Collection ===
- Na robu resničnosti (On the Edge of Reality), 1992

=== Novels ===
- Rahela (Rachel), 1989
- 1895, potres:kronika nenadejane ljubezni (1895, Earthquake: A Chronicle of an Unexpected Love), 1995
- Zadnja Sergijeva skušnjava (Sergij's Final Temptation), 1996
- Smeh za leseno pregrado (Laughter From Beyond the Wooden Barrier), 2000
- Aritmija (Arrhythmia), 2004
- Ljubezen v zraku (Love in the Air), 2009
- Kar je odnesla reka, kar je odnesel dim (What the River Swept Away, What Was Carried Away by Smoke), 2012
- Brez imena (No Name), 2018
- Jaka in Vane, zgodba iz osemdesetih (Jaka and Vane, A Story From the Eighties), 2021
- Vrnitev domov (Coming back home) 2023

=== For Young Readers ===
- Regata (Regata), 1995 (in Bosnian, translated by Josip Osti)
- Poletje na snegu (Summer on the Snow), 2003

Awards

- Lake Balaton TV festival, Best script, Vaški učitelj, 1995
- Prix Europa, Best script nomination for Vaški učitelj, 1995
- The Prešeren Foundation Award, 1999
- Pazin International Publishers' Award, 2000
- Njegoš Award (Montenegrin International Award) nomination, Med drevesi, 2017
- Župančič Award, Med drevesi, 2018
