= Desa Muck =

Slovenian writer and actor

- Born: 29 August 1955; Ljubljana, Socialist Federal Republic of Yugoslavia (now in Slovenia)
- Occupations: writer and actor
- Writing career
- Notable works: Lažniva Suzi, Anica series,
- Notable awards: Levstik Award; 2005 for the Anica series

Desa Muck (born 29 August 1955) is a Slovenian writer, children's writer and actor. She works as a freelance artist and writes newspaper columns, radio plays, but is best known for her juvenile fiction.

Muck was born in Ljubljana in 1955. She writes for children and teenagers and won the Levstik Award for her series of stories Anica in 2005.

== Awards ==
- My Favourite Book by young Slovenian readers winner 2003, 2004, 2005, 2006 and 2007
- Večernica Award nominee 1996, 2001, 2003 and 2004
- Večernica Award winner 1998
- Levstik Award winner 2005
- International Board on Books for Young People (IBBY) Honour List winner 2006

== Published works ==
=== Youth Literature ===
The Annie Series:

- Anica in grozovitež (Annie and the Monster), 2001
- Anica in materinski dan (Annie and Mother's Day), 2001
- Anica in zajček (Annie and the Bunny), 2001
- Anica in Jakob (Annie and Jacob), 2002
- Anica in športni dan (Annie and Sports Day), 2002
- Anica in velike skrbi (Annie and Great Worries), 2003
- Anica in počitnice (Annie and Holidays), 2004
- Anica in velika skrivnost (Annie and the Big Secret), 2004
- Anica in prva ljubezen (Annie and First Love), 2005
- Anica in skrivnostna maska (Annie and the Mysterious Mask), 2007

Other works for children and youth:

- Tistega lepega dne (That Fine Day), 1992
- Blazno resno o seksu (Deadly Seriously About Sex), 1993
- Pod milim nebom (Under the Open Skies), 1993
- Blazno resno popolni (Deadly Seriously Perfect), 1995
- Hči Lune (Daughter of the Moon), 1995
- Blazno resno zadeti (Deadly Seriously Stoned), 1996
- Kremplin (Claws), 1996
- Lažniva Suzi (Lying Suzy), 1997
- Blazno resno slavni (Deadly Seriously Famous), 1998
- Fonton, 1998
- Blazno resno o šoli (Deadly Seriously About School), 2000
- Čudež v operi (The Miracle at the Opera), 2001
- Sama doma (Girls Home Alone), 2001
- Kakšne barve je svet (What Colour Is the World), 2002
- Kokoš velikanka (The Giant Chicken), 2007
- Ko se želva izgubi ... (When the Tortoise Gets Lost...), 2009

=== Adult fiction ===
- Panika (Panic), 2003
- Neskončno ljubljeni moški (The Eternally Loved Man), 2004
- Pasti življenja (Life's Traps), 2005
- Peskovnik Boga Otroka (The Child God's Sandpit), 2006
- Pasti življenja II (Life's Traps II), 2007
- Nebo v očesu lipicanca (The Sky in the Lipizzaner's Eyes), 2010
