= Janov krik =

1985 biographical novel by Marinka Fritz Kunc

- Author: Marinka Fritz Kunc
- Language: Slovenian
- Subject: Adolescents, Boys, Delinquents, Emotions, Family, Maternal love
- Publisher: Prešernova družba, DZS, Partner graf
- Publication date: 1985
- Publication place: Slovenia
- Pages: 195
- ISBN: 86-341-1772-3
- OCLC: 32231756

Janov krik (Jan's Cry) is a biographical novel by Slovenian author Marinka Fritz Kunc. It was first published in 1985.
