= Šentpavel na Dolenjskem =

Šentpavel na Dolenjskem Sveti Pavel (until 1955)
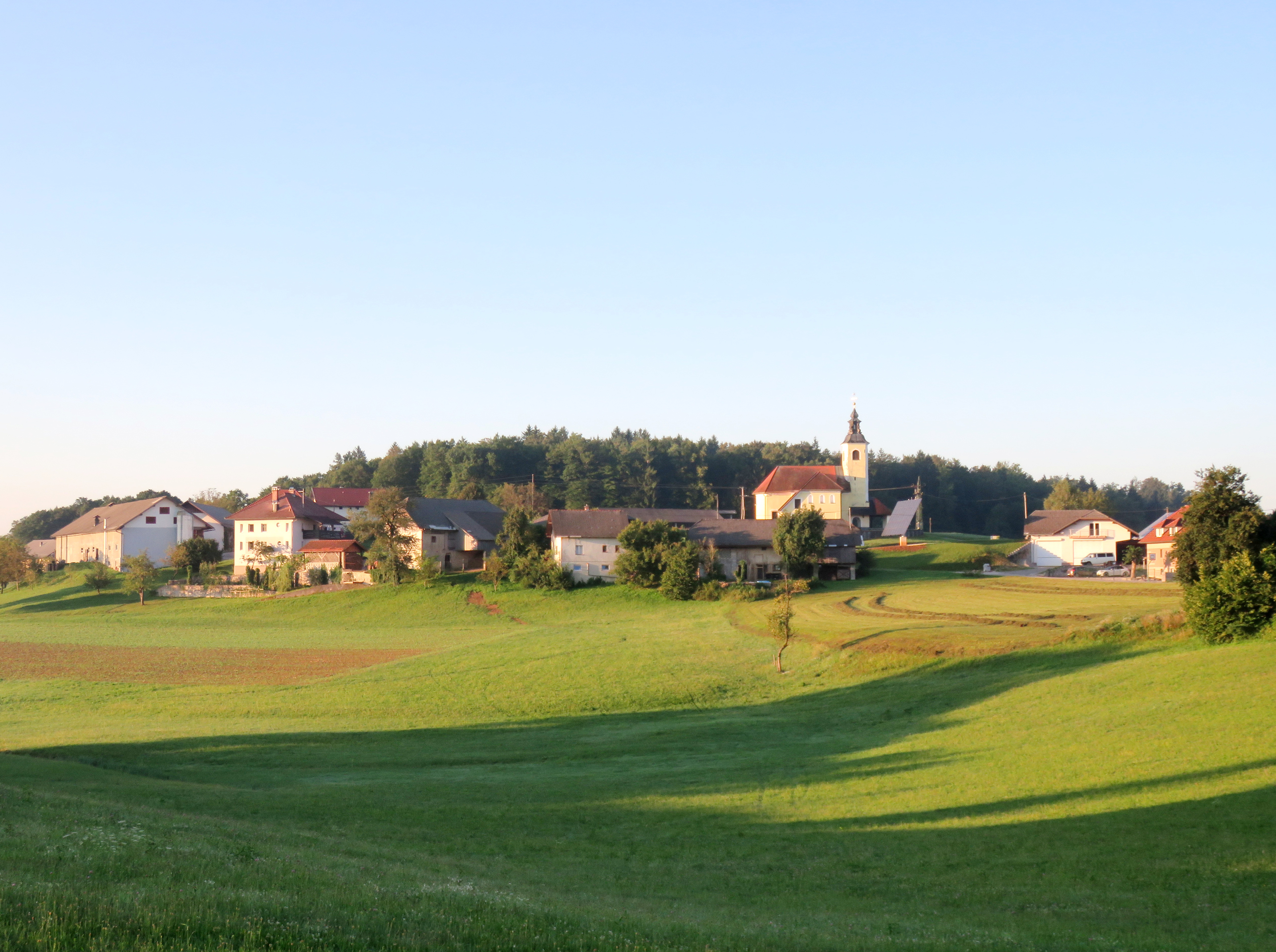

- Location in Slovenia
- Coordinates: 45°57′25.82″N 14°51′28.17″E
- Country: Slovenia
- Traditional region: Lower Carniola
- Statistical region: Central Slovenia
- Municipality: Ivančna Gorica

Area
  - Total: 1.99 km^{2} (0.77 sq mi)
- Elevation: 333.4 m (1,094 ft)

Population (2002)
  - Total: 143

Šentpavel na Dolenjskem (pronounced [ʃɛntˈpaːʋəl na dɔˈleːnskɛm] or [ʃəntˈpaːʋəl-]; German: Sankt Paul) is a settlement just east of Šentvid pri Stični in the Municipality of Ivančna Gorica in central Slovenia. The area is part of the historical region of Lower Carniola. The municipality is now included in the Central Slovenia Statistical Region. It includes the hamlets of Grumlof (in older sources also Grundelj, German: Grundelhof), and Mandrga.

== Name ==
The name of the settlement was changed from Sveti Pavel (literally, 'Saint Paul') to Šentpavel na Dolenjskem in 1955. The name was changed on the basis of the 1948 Law on Names of Settlements and Designations of Squares, Streets, and Buildings as part of efforts by Slovenia's postwar communist government to remove religious elements from toponyms.

== Church ==
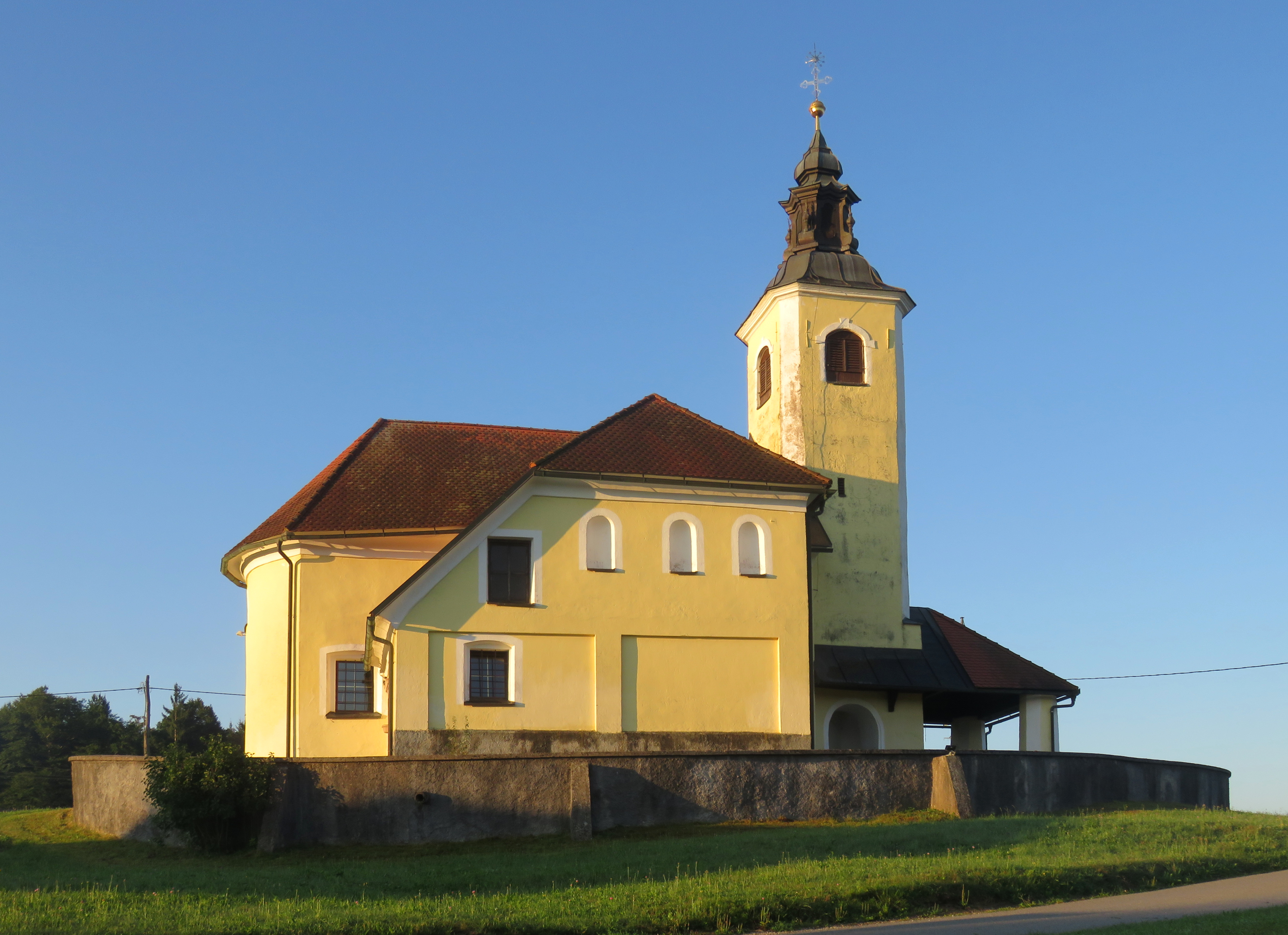
Saint Paul's Church

The local church from which the settlement get its name is dedicated to Saint Paul and belongs to the Parish of Šentvid pri Stični. It dates to the 16th century and was restyled in the Baroque in the 17th and 18th centuries.
