= Zoran Hočevar =

Slovene writer, playwright and painter (born 1944)

- Born: 21 December 1944; Metlika, Slovenia
- Occupations: Writer, playwright, painter
- Writing career
- Notable works: Šolen z Brega, M' te ubu!
- Notable awards: Kresnik Award; 1998 Šolen z Brega

Zoran Hočevar (born 21 December 1944) is a Slovene writer, playwright and painter.

He won the Kresnik Award for his novel Šolen z Brega in 1998.

== Novels ==
- Porkasvet (1995)
- Šolen z Brega (1997)
- Za znoret (1999)
- Rožen cvet (2004)
- Ernijeva kuhna (2010)

== Plays ==
- Smeči (1995)
- Mož za Zofijo (1998)
- M' te ubu (2001)
