= Peter Božič =

Slovenian writer and politician (1932–2009)

Peter Božič (30 December 1932 – 10 July 2009) was a Slovenian writer, playwright, journalist and politician. He is renowned for his modernist novels in which he described the events of World War II, and for the literary depictions of lower classes.

== Biography ==
Božič was born on 30 December 1932, in Bled, Slovenia, then part of the Kingdom of Yugoslavia. He spent his early childhood in Novo Mesto and in Maribor. During World War II, he was transferred with his family to the Silesian city of Breslau (now Wroclaw in Poland), and later to Dresden. As a child, he was touched by the cruelty of war: among other, he witnessed the bombing of Dresden.

After the war, Božič returned to Maribor, where he finished high school. He enrolled at the University of Ljubljana, but he never finished his studies. In his student years, he lived a bohemian lifestyle at the edge of society. He worked as a librarian in the industrial town of Jesenice and in the Lower Carniolan village of Krvava Peč.

In the late 1950s, Božič started collaborating with the Critical Generation, a group of young Slovene intellectuals that challenged the rigid cultural policies of the Titoist regime. In the 1960s, he returned to Ljubljana, where he lived as a freelance writer and later as a journalist. He frequently interchanged years in isolation and years of public activity.

In the early 1990s, after fall of communism, Božič became involved in politics. In 1990, he joined the Social Democratic Party of Slovenia, led by his youth friend Jože Pučnik. He quit the party in 1992, after Janez Janša was elected its president, and joined the Liberal Democracy of Slovenia. In 1998, he was elected to the City Council of Ljubljana. During his career in Ljubljana local politics, Božič was involved in several controversies, mainly connected with the internal fights within the Liberal Democracy of Slovenia. In 2006, he became one of the foremost supporters of the mayor Zoran Janković, and was re-elected to the Ljubljana City Council on the Zoran Janković List. He later joined the social liberal party Zares. In 2009, he proposed that a street in Ljubljana be named after the Yugoslav president Josip Broz Tito.

Božič died on 10 July 2009, aged 77, in Ljubljana.

== Work ==
Božič's early writings reflect the author's interest in existential philosophy, and show an influence of Samuel Beckett and Eugène Ionesco. He also experimented with surrealism and expressionism.

He is best known for his literary depictions of lower urban classes, and individuals living at the edges of society. His novels are frequently set in amidst urban poverty. His most famous novel, 'The Death of Father Vincent' (Očeta Vincenca smrt), in which he described his childhood experiences of war and exile, is considered as one of the best literary descriptions of World War Two in Slovenian literature.
