= Ivan Sivec =

Slovenian writer (born 1949)

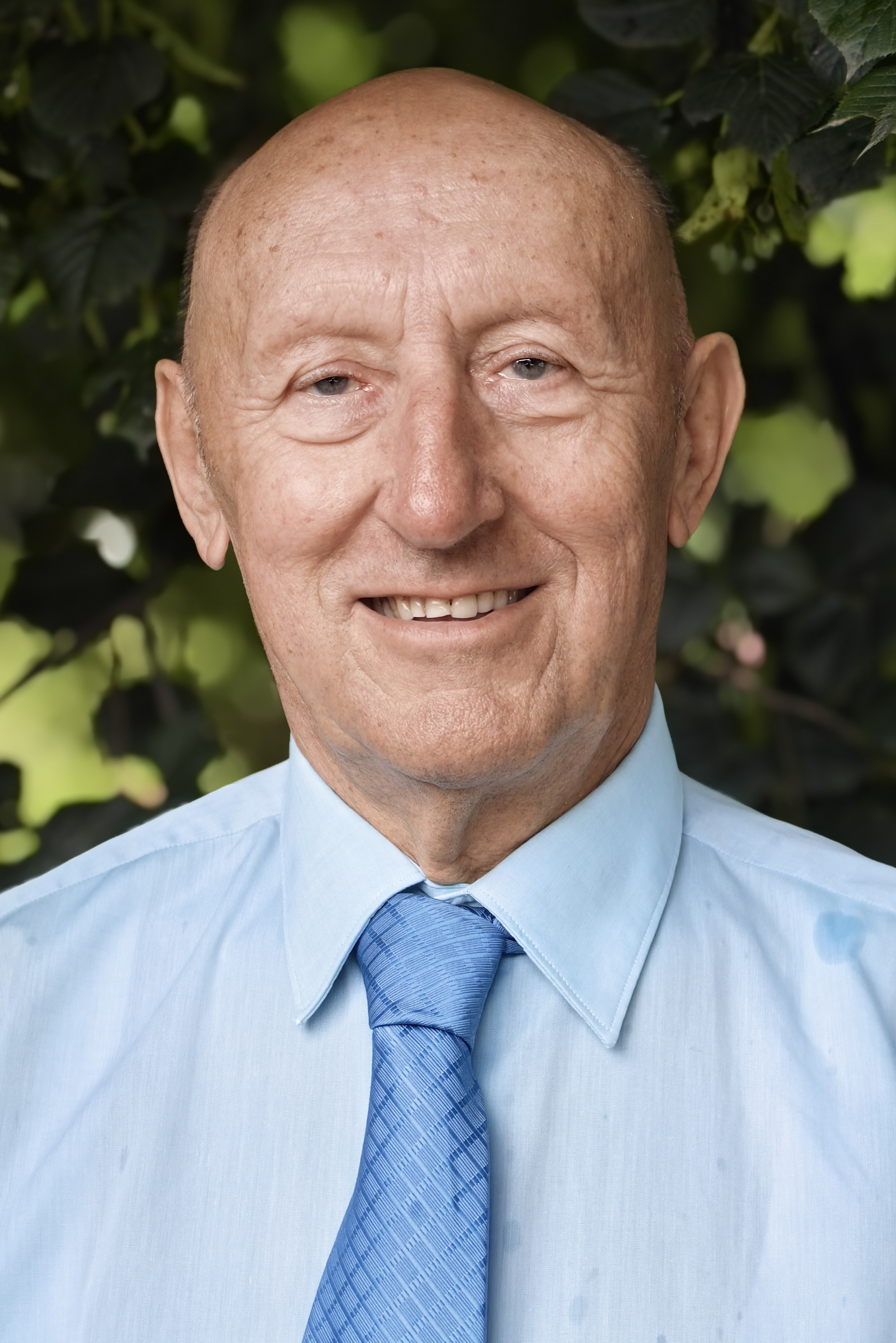
- Sivec in Grosuplje, 2024
- Born: 23 May 1949 (age 76) Moste pri Komendi, Yugoslavia (now in Slovenia)
- Occupation: Writer; author; lyricist
- Genre: Social novel; historical fiction; young adult literature

Website
- ivan.sivec.net

Ivan Sivec (born 23 May 1949) is a Slovenian writer, author, lyricist and storyteller. He lives and works in Mengeš.

He wrote more than 150 novels and more than 3,000 lyrics for popular music, which made him the most prolific writer in the history of Slovenian literature. He is most known for his historical novels – on Carantania, the ancient Slovenian homeland, on Romans in this part of the empire, on the Counts of Celje, for his collection of Slovenian Castle Stories, for his travelogues and for his biographical novels about Slovenian writers, poets, musicians and other artists. Several of his novels, especially for the youth have been made into feature films and TV series. His work was described as a new realism which borders on documentary.

== Life ==
Ivan Sivec was born in Moste pri Komendi, Upper Carniola to father Andrej Sivec (1904) from Moste pri Komendi, a farmer, and Marija Sivec (born Marinšek, 1912) from Preserje pri Radomljah, a farmeress. Ivan had two older brothers: Ciril, born 1938, and Andrej, born 1941. As a child he was sent to school a year earlier, at the age of 6. At 10, he read his first longer book, Pod svobodnim soncem [Under the free sun] by Fran Saleški Finžgar. During the primary school (1955–1963) he often performed in poetry recitations and school plays. Ana Razpotnik, teacher of Slovenian, encouraged him to publish in Ciciban (Slovenian monthly for children aged 6 to 8), Pionirski list (monthly for young people aged 9 to 15) and to the regional newspaper (twice weekly, in Kranj) Gorenjski glas [Voice of the Upper Carniola]. In 1967, he majored in electrical engineering from a four-year technical secondary school in Ljubljana and got a job as a radio broadcasting technician at the Radio-Television of Slovenia, also in Ljubljana. While he was a secondary school student, Radio Ljubljana aired several of his fairy tales, humorous stories and feuilletons. In the same time he also collected descriptions of folk customs and traditions for the ethnologist Niko Kuret of the Institute of Slovenian Ethnology, and had a regular column about it in Gorenjski glas. In 1973, he enrolled in Slovenian studies at the Faculty of Arts of the Ljubljana University and graduated in 1978 (thesis title: Stilno označena sredstva v Pohlinovem jeziku na leksikalni in sintaktični ravni [Stylistically marked means in Pohlin's language at the lexical and syntactic level]. He mostly worked in the afternoon, at night and on weekends, while in the morning hours he attended lectures and performed regular study duties. Yet he enjoyed studying as nothing else before. As a student he also contributed to the program of Radio Ljubljana, including, from 1976, longer reportage emissions for the Documentary and Featurette department. In 1979, he was promoted to the Morning Editorial Department, and from 1980 until his retirement in 2007, to the Documentary-Feuilleton Editorial Office. Here he was employed as a journalist, and from 1993 to 2005 as the department editor.

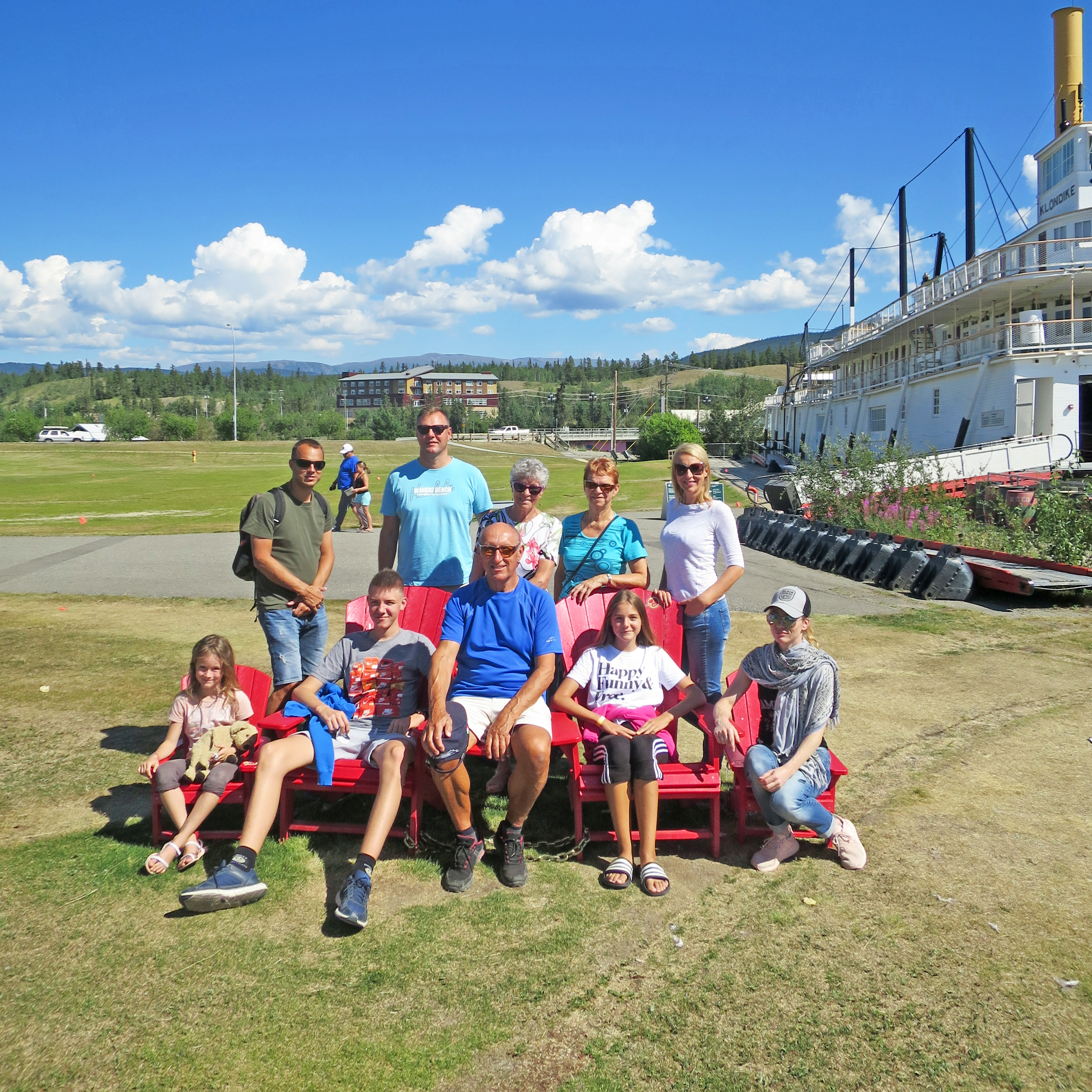
Family in Alaska, 2018

In 2002, he graduated with master's thesis Fenomen ansambla bratov Avsenik [The Phenomenon of the Avsenik Brothers Ensemble] from the Ethnology department of the Faculty of Arts in Ljubljana, under the supervision of Marko Terseglav and Janez Bogataj.

As a journalist, he traveled extensively in Slovenia and through a large part of Yugoslavia for business, as well as leisure.

He followed the routes taken by Jack London to Alaska, of Jules Verne through France and to the top of Mont Blanc, in the footsteps of the Slovenian-Croatian ethnologist Ivan Benigar (1883–1950) through Argentina, along the routes of the anthropologist William W. Howells (1908–2005) through Namibia, of the priest and mountaineer Janko Mlakar across European mountains, including Jungfrau, following the paths of the Aboriginal Australians, of the Maori people in New Zealand and the voyages of the poet France Prešeren in Slovenia, Austria and Moravia.

== Work ==
Slovenian literary historian Helga Glušič characterized Sivec work as a new realism with a touch of documentary.

The rural story Pesem njenih zvonov [The Song of her Bells, 122 pages], published in 1972, was his first longer text. It appeared in the rural weekly (and publishing house) Kmečki glas [Peasant Voice] in 1970 as a feuilleton and became so popular that it was also published as a book. It was very well received by the readers which encouraged Sivec to take up writing and to become one of the most productive and most widely read Slovenian writers. The Song of her Bells is a traumatic family story, which the father told the writer only when he came of age, and it is about the writer's uncle, his love to the village beauty and the later tragic events. Just before the wedding the uncle was picking linden flowers from a tree for his bride and fell from it to his death. According to literary historian Miran Hladnik, known for analysis of Slovenian rural stories ... with this book Sivec gave the reader, who had previously only been offered a socially critical or existentialist variant of farm life, a real, romantic, popular peasant story, about which the literary critics and historians will hardly write anything good, but the reader nevertheless enjoys it again and again. Even if he or she is aware that the story is unusual, improbable, unrealistic, out-of-date or even copied from old popular works. The book was reprinted in 1982, 1992 and 2011.

Sivec continued to write rural stories and novels, influenced mainly by the 19th and early 20th century Slovenian romantic and literary realists Josip Jurčič, Janko Kersnik, Ivan Tavčar, Fran Saleški Finžgar, and adventure stories by Jack London.

Among his most popular books are historical novels (for clarity only English translations of the original titles are given): the Carantania trilogy (King Samo, Emperor Arnulf, Viscountess Emma); a tetralogy about the Romans in Slovenia (The Last Celtic Chieftain, The Fatal Emonian Beauty, The Tempest over the Cold River, Attila, Scourge of God); pentalogy about the Counts of Celje (Knights of the Morning Dawn, The Shining Stars of Celje, The Queen with Three Crowns, The Lonely Wild Flower, The Last Viscount of Celje); the first European Iron Age novel – Showdown at the Full Moon; a collection of Slovenian Castle Stories (Don't Forget Our Love, Lost Heart, Blind Countess, Blue Rose, Lord of Visoko, Love at Kolpa river); biographical novels (about Prešeren, Gregorčič, Jurčič, Tavčar, Trdina, Aljaž, Murn, Plečnik and others); the collection Dotik srca [Touch of Heart] (I Come to the Shore Every Day, When You Touch the Sky, At Sunset, Seven Broken Roses, Blooming Slovenia, Beauty of the Trnovo parish).

Branko Gradišnik encouraged Sivec to start writing for the youth and the first such work was the adventure novel Pozabljeni zaklad (Forgotten Treasure, 386 pages, 1978, reprinted 2001). A three-part television series was based on it, and a feature film in 2001, directed by Tugo Štiglic; it received the "Golden Roll", Slovenian "most-watched film" award. Feature films and TV series were made after three more of his novels: Vlomilci delajo poleti (Burglars Work in the Summer, 2010), Zakleta bajta (The Cursed Shack, 2011) and Princ na belem konju (The Prince on a White Horse, 2012).

In Sivec biography on the site of the Slovenian Writer's Association his work was classified in 13 groups:

- historical novels
- biographical novels
- books about music
- long short stories and novellas
- memoirs
- travelogues
- humorous stories
- adventure novels
- socio-psychological novels
- the Happy family collection
- sports-themed books
- books for younger readers
- picture books for the youngest

Several of his books have been translated into German, English (The X Factor / Confessions of a naive fashion model), French and Italian. Fourteen books have been reprinted, several books have been dramatized, more than 100 books have been published in electronic format, more than 50 as audiobooks, and some in Braille format. On the Notable people website, Sivec is ranked among the prominent Slovenian personalities. As of 2024 the bibliography of Ivan Sivec contained over 750 units, including 188 books.

Sivec wrote more than 3,000 lyrics for popular music and two monographs on the development of folk music in Slovenia (All the best musicians I, 1998 and All the best musicians II, 2003), as well as several biographies of the Slovenian folk musicians such as Avsenik Brothers (1999, 2010) and Lojze Slak (2004). He also published several collections of lyrics, including Pod cvetočimi kostanji [Under the flowering chestnut trees], 2012.

He also published several picture books for children, including Rooster Skating School (2005) and The Magic Triangle (2011). He has published three books for the very young, including the contemporary fairy tale Holiday on Mars (2008). Sivec presents his books at school Reading badge events and literary evenings, and also acts as a keynote speaker. So far, he participated in more than a thousand such performances, mainly in Slovenia, but also during his overseas travels, for the Slovenian expats.

Since 1987, he has been a member of the Slovenian Writers' Association. In 1996 he became the first president of the Society of poets of Slovenian music. In 2019, Sivec was awarded Slovenia's Order of Merit, for his 'extremely extensive, diverse and resounding opus, which nurtures the national consciousness'.

== Personal life ==
With his wife Sonja (married in 1971) he settled in Mengeš in 1972. They have two children, Vesna (1973) and Iztok (1978), and three grandchildren: Mark, Lana and Maša.
