= Dim Zupan =

Slovene children's writer (born c. 1946)

- Born: 19 February 1946; Ljubljana, Socialist Federal Republic of Yugoslavia (now in Slovenia)
- Occupation: Fiction writer
- Writing career
- Notable works: Leteči mački, Drekec Pekec in Pukec Smukec
- Notable awards: Levstik Award; 1996 for Leteči mački

Dim Zupan (born 19 February 1946) is a Slovene children's writer. He has also published three novels for adult readers.

Zupan was born in Ljubljana in 1946. He studied Law at the University of Ljubljana. He published his first children's book in 1991, introducing the characters of Drekec Pekec and Pukec Smukec (Super Pooper and Farty Party) which became very popular with young readers and feature in a further four of his books. He has also published over twenty other books, including three novels and a theatre play.

In 1996 he received the Levstik Award for his books Drekec Pekec in Pukec Smukec (Super Pooper and Farty Party) and Leteči mački (Flying Cats).

== Published works ==
For young children

- Zobek na dopustu (Little Tooth on Holiday), 1995
- Tolovajevo leto (The Year of the Robber), 1995
- 'Maščevanje strašne juhice (The Revenge of the Terrible Soup), 1997

Young adult literature

- Trije dnevi Drekca Pekca in Pukca Smukca (Three Days in the Lives of Super Pooper and Farty Party), 1991
- Trnovska mafija (The Trnovo Mafia), 1992
- Tri noči Drekca Pekca in Pukca Smukca (Three Nights in the Lives of Super Pooper and Farty Party), 1993
- Tri skrivnosti Drekca Pekca in Pukca Smukca (Three Secrets of Super Pooper and Farty Party), 1994
- Tri zvezdice Drekca Pekca in Pukca Smukca (Three Stars of Super Pooper and Farty Party), 1995
- Leteči mački (Flying Cats), 1996
- Trnovska mafija drugič (The Trnovo Mafia Again), 1997
- Tri spoznanja Drekca Pekca in Pukca Smukca (Three Realizations of Super Pooper and Farty Party), 1998
- Rdeči teloh (Red Hellebore), 1998
- Onkraj srebrne mavrice (Beyond the Silver Rainbow), 1998
- Modri kamen modrosti (The Blue Stone of Wisdom), 1999
- Dežela odrezanih glav (the Land of Severed Heads), 2001
- Osica Maja (Maya the Wasp), 2004
- Ko pridejo angelčki (When the Little Angels Come), 2004
- Štirinajst in pol (Fourteen and a Half), 2005
- Hektor in ribja usoda (Hector and Fish Fate), 2006
- Hektor in mala šola (Hector and Prep School), 2007
- Deklica za ogledalom (The Little Girl Behind the Mirror), 2007
- Hektor in velika avantura (Hector and the Great Adventure), 2009
- Hektor in male ljubezni (Hector and a Little Love), 2009
- Bela noč v črni vasi (White Night in the Black Village), 2009

Adult fiction

- Temna zvezda smrti (The Dark Star of Death), 1993
- Žametni soj (Velvet Shining), 2000
- Hudo brezno (The Terrible Abyss), 2005
