= Brina Svit =

Slovenian writer

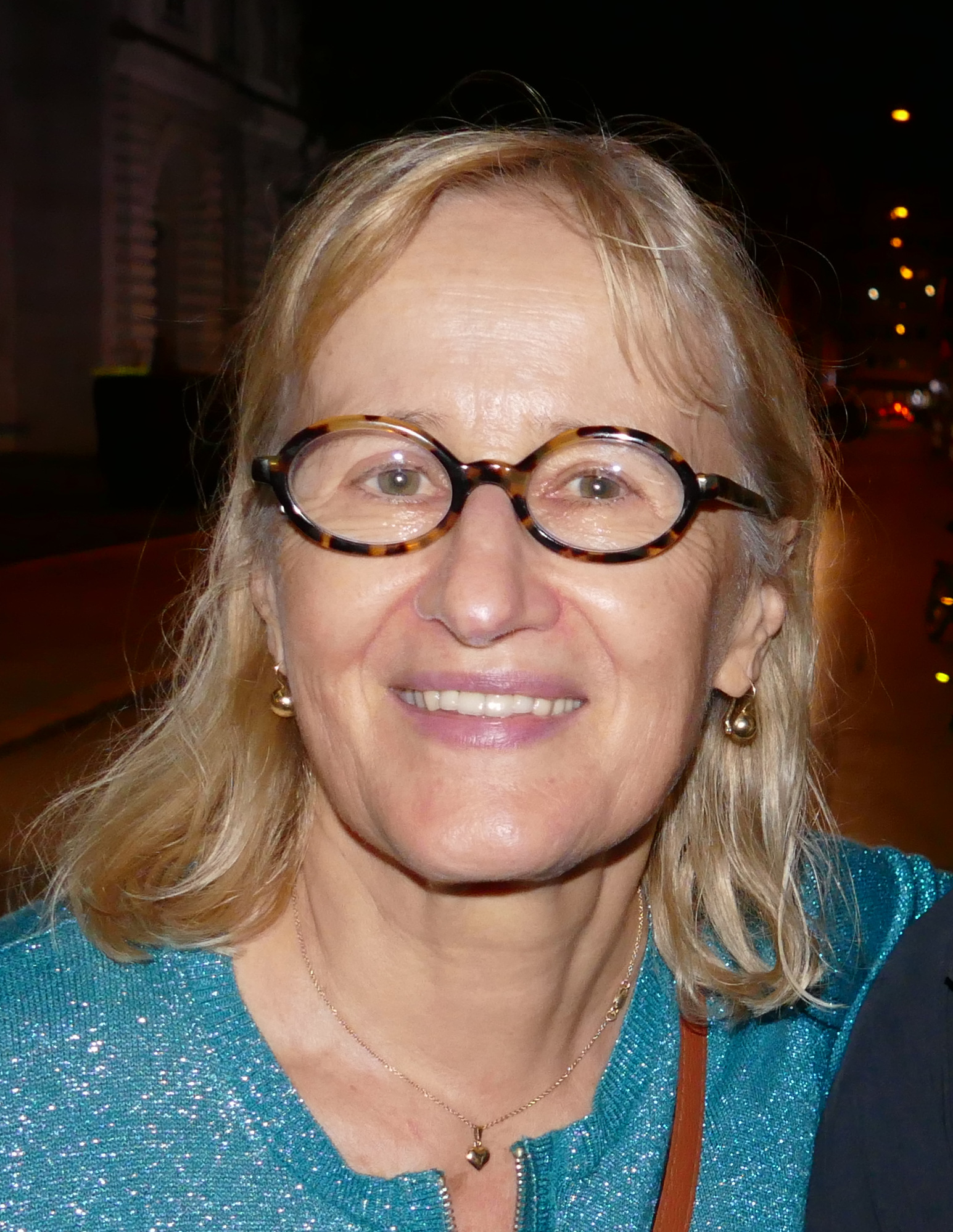

Brina Švigelj-Mérat (alias, Brina Svit; born 31 May 1954 in Ljubljana) is a Slovenian writer.

She studied French Philology and Comparative Literature at the University of Ljubljana, and she moved to Paris in 1980

== Bibliography ==
- Con brio, 1998
- Smrt slovenske primadone, 2000
- Moreno, 2003
- Un cœur de trop, 2006
- Coco Dias ou la Porte Dorée, 2007.
- Petit éloge de la rupture, 2009
- Une nuit à Reykjavík, 2011
- Visage slovène, 2013
