= Vinko Möderndorfer =

Slovene writer, poet, playwright and theatre and film director

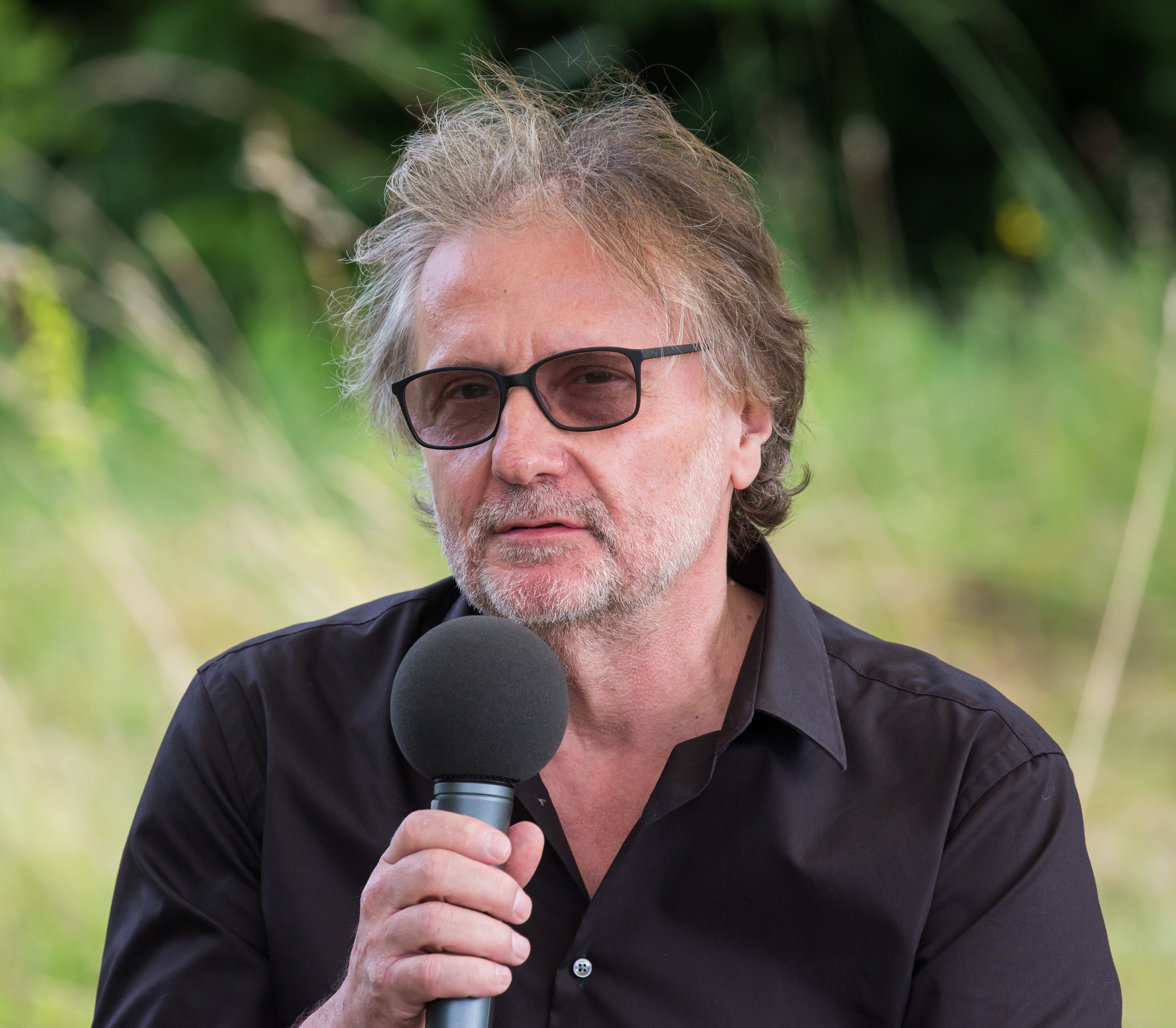
- Vinko Möderndorfer in 2020
- Born: 22 September 1958 (age 68); Celje, Socialist Federal Republic of Yugoslavia (now in Slovenia)
- Occupations: Writer, poet, playwright and director
- Writing career
- Notable works: Krog male smrti, Nekatere ljubezni, Gledališče v ogledalu
- Notable awards: Prešeren Foundation Award; 2000 for Nekatere ljubezni Rožanc Award; 2003 for Gledališče v ogledalu

Vinko Möderndorfer (born 22 September 1958) is a Slovene writer, poet, playwright and theatre and film director.

Möderndorfer was born in Celje in 1958. He studied at the Academy for Theatre, Radio, Film and Television in Ljubljana and worked in numerous theatre companies around Slovenia. He started writing poetry in the late 1970s and since the early 1980s also published numerous works of prose, essays and drama as well as poetry and stories for children.

In 2000 he won the Prešeren Foundation Award for his book of short stories Nekatere ljubezni. In 2003 he received the Rožanc Award for Gledališče v ogledalu (The Theatre in a Mirror).

== Film ==
- Inferno (2014 Slovenian film) directed by Vinko Möderndorfer, starring Jozica Avbelj, Ludvik Bagari, Silvo Bozic
- Predmestje (2004)
- Landscape No. 2 (2008)
- Zastoj (2021)

== Published work ==
=== Poetry for children ===
- Kako se dan lepo začne (The Day Starts So Well), 1993
- Madonca fleten svet (Goodness, What A Lovely World), 1995
- Zakaj so sloni rahlospeči (Why Elephants Are Light Sleepers), 2003
- Luža, čevelj, smrkelj in rokav (Puddle, Shoe, Snot, and Sleeve) 2009

=== Prose for children ===
- Sin Srakolin, 1999
- Muc Langus in Čarovnička Gajka (Langus the Tomcat and Gajka the Little Witch), 2002
- Vrnitev muca Langusa in Čarovničke Gajke (The Return of Langus the Tomcat and Gajka the Little Witch), 2006
- Potovanje muca Langusa & Čarovničke Gajke (The Travels of Langus the Tomcat and Gajka the Little Witch), 2009
- Rdečehlačka : vesele zgodbe zelo male deklice (Redpants : Happy Stories of A eryLittle Girl), 2010
- Velika žehta (The Great Wash), 2011

=== Dramska for children ===
- Pozor! Hudobe na delu! (Beware! Evildoersat Work!), 1997
- Miši v operni hiši (Mice at the Opera House), 2007

=== Poetry collections for adults ===
- Rdeči ritual (The Red Ritual), 1975
- Pesmičice (Small Poems), 1977
- Mah (Moss), 1981
- Telo (Body), 1989
- Male nočne ljubavne pesmi (Little Nightly Love Poems), 1993
- Zlodejeve žalostinke (The Devil's Laments), 1999
- Pesmi iz črne kronike (Poems from the Black Chronicle), 1999
- Temno modro kot september (Dark Blue Like September), 2003
- Skala in srce (Boulder and Heart), 2004
- Razhajanja (Partings), 2007
- Dotikanja (Touchings), 2008
- Tavanja (Wanderings), 2010
- Prostost sveta (The Freedom of the World), 2011
- Nimam več sadja zate (I Have No More Fruit for You), 2011

=== Short stories ===
- Krog male smrti (The Small Death Circle), 1993
- Čas brez angelov (A Time Without Angels), 1994
- Tarok pri Mariji (Tarot at Maria's), 1994
- Ležala sva tam in se slinila kot hudič (We Lay There Slobbering Like Hell), 1996
- Nekatere ljubezni (Some Loves), 1997
- Total (Total), 2000
- Druga soba: novelete (The Other Room), 2004
- Vsakdanja spominjanja : zgodbe 1993–2007 (Eneryday Memories: stories 1993 – 2007), 2008
- Kino dom : zgodbe nekega kina (Home Cinema: the Stories of a Movie Theatre), 2008
- Plava ladja (The Blue Boat), 2010

=== Novels ===
- Tek za rdečo hudičevko, (Running After the Red She-Devil), 1996
- Pokrajina št. 2 (Landscape No.2), 1998
- Predmestje, (Outskirts), 2002
- Omejen rok trajanja, (Limited Sell By Date), 2003
- Ljubezni Sinjebradca, (Bluebeard's Loves), 2005
- Nespečnost (Insomnia), 2006
- Odprla sem oči in šla k oknu (I Opened My Eyes and Went to the Window), 2007
- Opoldne nekega dne, (At Midday One Day), 2008
- Nihče več ne piše pisem, (No One Writes Letters Anymore), 2011

=== Plays ===
- Kruti dnevi (Cruel Days), 1982
- Prilika o doktorju Josefu Mengeleju (A Tale of Doctor Josef Mengele), 1986
- Help, 1989
- Camera obscura, 1990
- Hamlet in Ofelija (Hamlet and Ophelia), 1994
- Transvestitska svatba (The Transvestite Wedding), 1994
- Sredi vrtov (Amidst Gardens), 1995
- Štirje letni časi (The Four Seasons), 1996
- Jožef in Marija (Joseph and Mary), 1997
- Vaja zbora – tri komedije (Choral Practice – Three Comedies), 1998
- Limonada slovenica (Slovenian Soap), 1999
- Mama je umrla dvakrat (Mother Died Twice), 1999
- Podnajemnik (The Subtennant), 2000
- Klub Fahreinheit (The Fareinheit Club), 2001
- Mefistovo poročilo (Mephistopheles' Report), 2002
- Tri sestre (The Three Sisters), 2002
- Limonada slovenica: štiri komedije (Slovenian Soap: Four Comedies), 2003
- Na kmetih (On the Farm), 2003
- Mrtve duše (Dead Souls), 2004
- Na dnu (At the Bottom), 2006
- Šah mat ali Šola moralne prenove za može in žene (Cheque Mate or the School of Moral Renweal for Men and Women), 2006
- Štiri komedije (Four Comedies), 2008
- Lep dan za umret (A Good Day to Die), 2009
- Blumen aus Krain: igre 1990–2010 (Blumen aus Krain: plays 1990–2010), 2011

=== Essay collections ===
- Gledališče v ogledalu (The Theatre in a Mirror), 2001
- Vzporedni svet : razmišljanja o ustvarjanju (Parallel World : Thoughts on Creativity), 2005
- Hvalnica koži (Encomium to Skin), 2011
