= Jurij Hudolin =

Slovene poet and writer

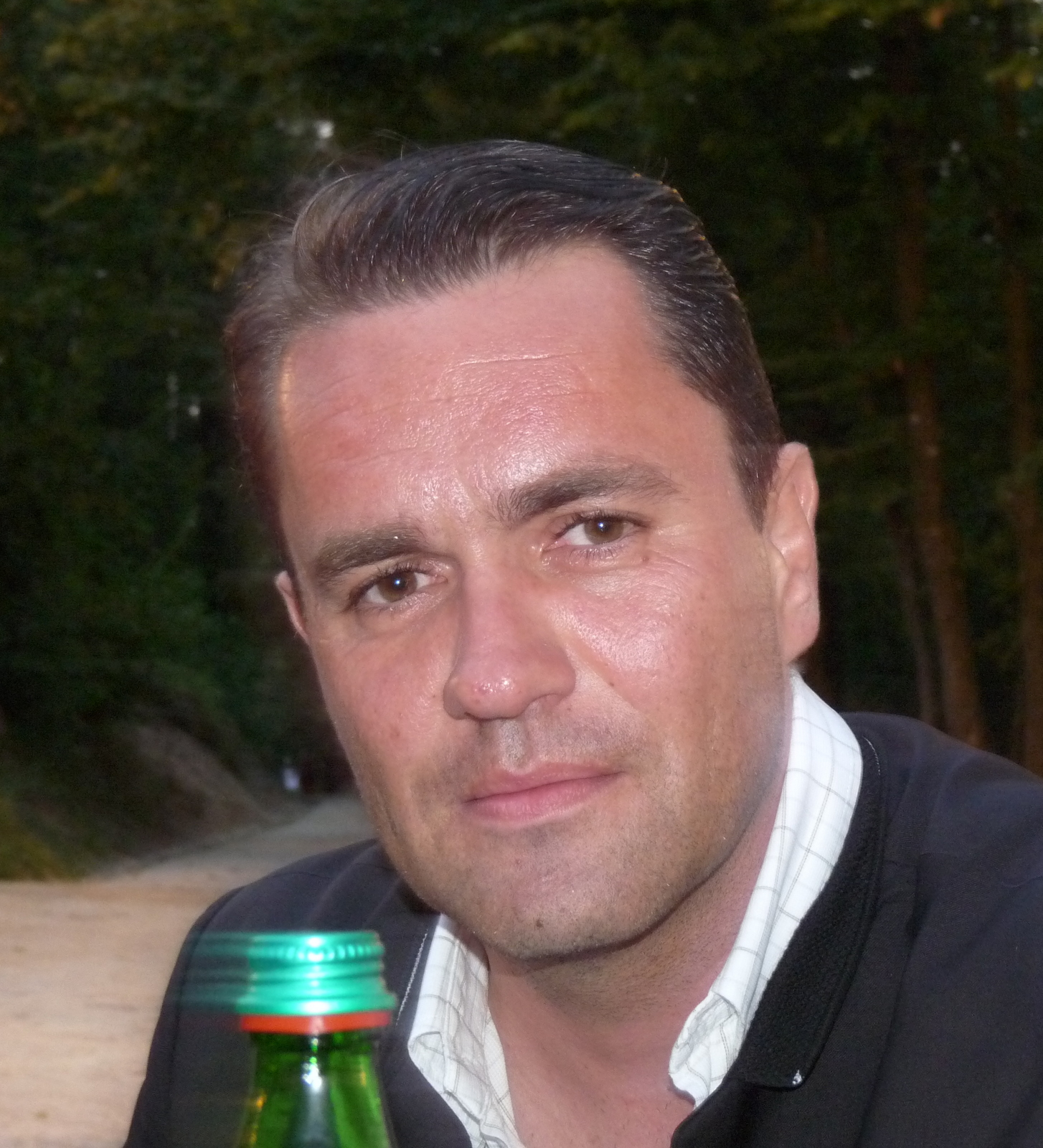
- Hudolin in 2014
- Born: 29 May 1973 (age 53); Ljubljana, Socialist Federal Republic of Yugoslavia (now in Slovenia)
- Occupations: Poet, writer, editor, translator
- Writing career
- Notable works: Govori ženska, Pastorek, Vrvohodec, Ingrid Rosenfeld

Jurij Hudolin (born 29 May 1973) is a Slovene poet, writer, columnist and translator. He has published a number of poetry collections and novels and is known for the rich language he uses and a rebellious rejectionist stance towards the world.

Hudolin was born in 1973 in Ljubljana. He grew up in Ljubljana and for a while near Pula in Istria before returning to Ljubljana to complete his secondary education and going on to study comparative literature and Serbo-Croatian at the University of Ljubljana. He published his first collection of poetry entitled Če je laž kralj (If Lies are King) in 1991 and has since published a further six poetry collections as well as three novels. His columns are regularly published in Mladina, Delo, Dnevnik, Večer and other journals and newspapers and he published a selection of them in a book in 2004 titled Pusti ti to (You Leave That Alone). His poetry has been published in many literary journals and anthologies both at home and abroad and his novels are well received amongst readers and critics alike.

After 2005, he began publishing prose and has since published seven novels and a book of short stories. In his prose, he describes mostly interpersonal relationships and life in various cities and places where he lived, from the Mediterranean to mainland Ljubljana. The author is characterized by his own syntax and rich expression. His best-known novel is Pastorek which has been translated into six languages, most recently into German as Der Stiefsohn (Septime Verlag, Wien, 2019). Hudolin's novel Ingrid Rosenfeld, nominated for the Kresnik Award in 2014, is about Jews, violence and tenderness, a picturesque vision of the world and an unwavering love of literature: this novel is a treasure trove of canons of world and Slovenian literary history. His most recent novels, Čas lepih žensk/Time of Beautiful Women (Beletrina, 2023) and Velika in moški spol/The Great and the Male Gender (KUD Apokalipsa, 2023), have been widely acclaimed by Slovenian readers and critics. His works have also been discussed in graduate and postgraduate works.

He has received several awards, prizes and award nominations for his work and has been the recipient of various national and international scholarships.

Hudolin's books have been translated into German, Hungarian, Czech, Croatian, English, Macedonian, Serbian and Albanian.

== Published works ==
=== Poetry collections ===
- Hudolin, Jurij (1991) Če je laž kralj/If Lies are King (1 st. ed.) Zagorje: Zveza kulturnih organizacij
- Hudolin, Jurij (1992). Ajdbog in ptičvolkkača (1st ed.). Grosuplje: Mondena. ISBN 961-6076-07-8.
- Hudolin, Jurij (1993). Bestije (1st ed.). Novo mesto: Dolenjska založba. ISBN 961-6000-08-X.
- Hudolin, Jurij (1993). Divjanje (1st ed.). Ljubljana: Društvo slovenskih pisateljev.
- Hudolin, Jurij (1998). Prividi nemirnega čudaka/Delusions of Restless Weirdo (1st ed.). Ljubljana: Karantanija. ISBN 961-226-243-8.
- Hudolin, Jurij (2001). Govori ženska/Woman Speaks (1st ed.). Ljubljana: Študentska založba. ISBN 961-6356-49-6.
- Hudolin, Jurij (2009). Ljubezni/Loves (1st ed.). Ljubljana: Nova revija. ISBN 978-961-6580-49-6.
- Hudolin, Jurij (2015). Prištinski dnevnik/Pristina Diary (1st ed.). Ljubljana: KUD Apokalipsa. ISBN 978-961-6894-66-1.
- Hudolin, Jurij (2018). Pudak in Rosenmind/Pudak and Rosenmind (1st ed.). Ljubljana: KUD Apokalipsa. ISBN 978-961-7054-12-5.

=== Novels, short stories, columns ===
- Hudolin, Jurij (2005). Objestnost/Arrogance (1st ed.). Ljubljana: Študentska založba. ISBN 961-242-028-9.
- Hudolin, Jurij (2008). Pastorek/Stepchild (1st ed.). Ljubljana: Študentska založba. ISBN 978-961-242-152-6.
- Hudolin, Jurij (2011). Vrvohodec/Ropewalker (1st ed.). Ljubljana: Študentska založba. ISBN 978-961-242-346-9.
- Hudolin, Jurij (2013). Ingrid Rosenfeld (1st ed.). Ljubljana: Študentska založba. ISBN 978-961-242-510-4.
- Hudolin, Jurij (2017). Trst via Ljubljana (roman)Trst via Ljubljana (novel) (1st ed.). Maribor: Litera. ISBN 978-961-7018-53-0.
- Hudolin, Jurij (2018). Ljubljanske ulice (roman)/Ljubljana Streets (novel) (1st ed.). Maribor: Litera. ISBN 978-961-7018-13-4.
- Hudolin, Jurij (2019). O smehu Zlatka Čordića/About Zlatko Čordić's Laughter (1st ed.). Ljubljana: Beletrina. ISBN 978-961-284-534-6.
- Hudolin, Jurij (2020). Samohodec (biografski roman / po nekaterih motivih iz življenja Igorja Vidmarja)/Samohodec (biographical novel / based on some motives from the life of Igor Vidmar) (1st ed.). Ljubljana: Beletrina. ISBN 978-961-284-643-5.
- Hudolin, Jurij (2021). Pisma s potovanja (eseji, potopisi, portreti)/Letters from a Journey (essays, travelogues, portraits) (1st ed.). Ljubljana: KUD Apokalipsa. ISBN 978-961-7054-36-1.
- Hudolin, Jurij (2023). Čas lepih žensk (roman)/Time of Beautiful Women (novel). Ljubljana: Beletrina. ISBN 978-961-298-015-3.
- Hudolin, Jurij (2023). Velika in moški spol (roman)/The Great Female and the Male Gender. Ljubljana: Kud Apokalipsa. ISBN 978-961-7054-55-2.

=== Anthologies ===
- Ten Slovenian poets of the nineties: [selected poems] (2002). Ljubljana: P.E.N.
- Česko-slovinská literární setkání/Czech-Slovenian Literary Meetings (1st ed.). Ljubljana: Beletrina. 2003. ISBN 961-91010-0-6.
- Mi se vrnemo zvečer : antologija mlade slovenske poezije: 1990-2003, We'll be back in the evening : anthology of young Slovenian poetry, 1990-2003 (1st ed.). Ljubljana: Beletrina. 2004. ISBN 961-6446-58-4.
- Vraćamo se uvečer: We'll be back in the evening, anthology of young Slovenian poetry, 1990-2000 (1st ed.). Zagreb: Hrvatsko društvo pisaca: Durieux. 2006. ISBN 953-188-232-0.
- Decametron: dieci poeti sloveni contemporanei: (nati tra il 1960 e il 1980)/Decametron: ten contemporary Slovenian poets: (born between 1960 and 1980) (1st ed.). Ljubljana: Centro sloveno P.E.N. 2009. ISBN 978-961-6547-40-6.
- Pordenonelegge 2010: Evropa onkraj meja = l'Europa oltre confine: the Slovene Writers' Association at the Pordenonelegge 2010/Pordenonelegge 2010: Europe beyond borders (1st ed.). Ljubljana: P.E.N. 2010. ISBN 978-961-6547-40-6.
- Atlas evropske lirike/Atlas of European Lyrics (1st ed.). Banja Luka: Udruženje književnika Srpske. 2013. ISBN 978-99938-48-68-4.
- Sodobna slovenska poezija v portugalskih prevodih/Contemporary Slovenian Poetry in Portuguese Translations (1st ed.). Maribor: KUD Pranger. 2016. ISBN 978-961-92019-3-0.
- Darovi evropske priče/The Gifts of a European Witness (1st ed.). Banja Luka: Društvo Slovenaca Republike Srpske Triglav. 2016. ISBN 978-99976-648-8-4.
- Odisejevo utočište: poezija na tri mjesta/Poetry in Three Places = Odysseus' Refuge (1st ed.). Zagreb: Sandorf. 2019. ISBN 978-953-351-190-0.
