= Janja Vidmar =

Slovenian author and screenwriter (born 1962)

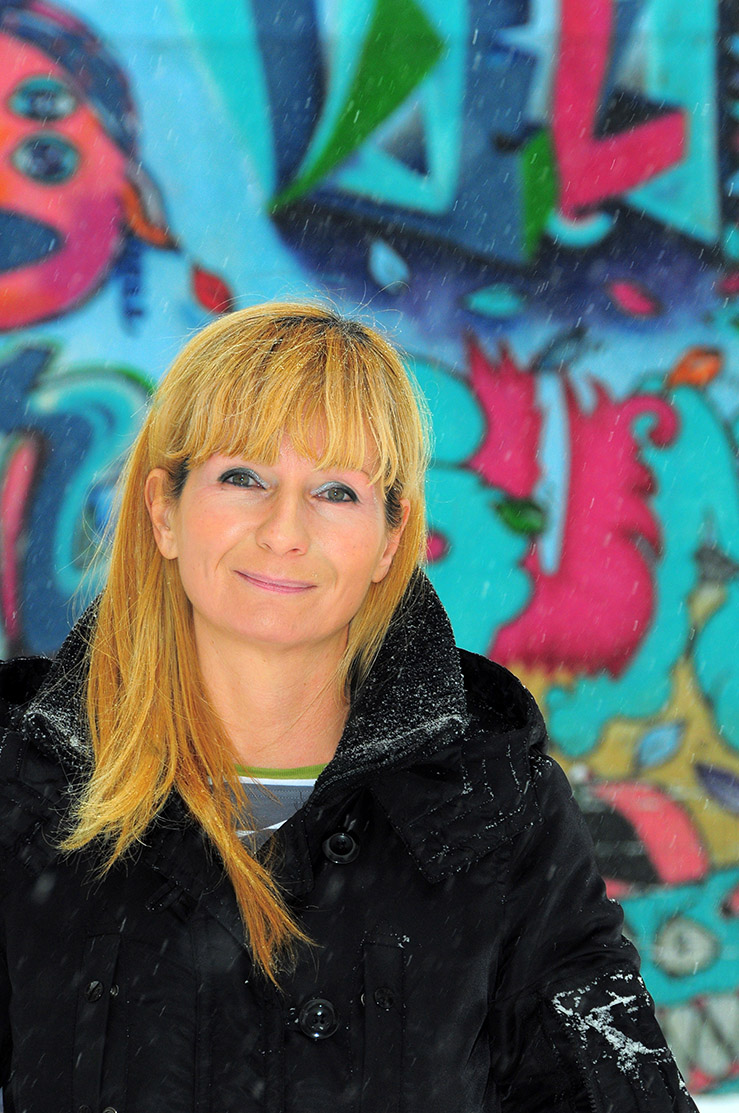
Janja Vidmar in year 2012

Janja Vidmar (born 23 March 1962 in Ptuj, Slovenia [then as SR Slovenia in SFR Yugoslavia]) is a Slovenian author and screenwriter. She is one of Slovenia's most acclaimed authors of youth literature (including Princeska z napako, Debeluška, Zoo, Pink, and Kebarie) and is recently tackling adult literature as well (Tretja možnost).

== Life, influences and awards ==
Before her elementary school, the family moved to Maribor, where Vidmar graduated from elementary school and enrolled in the First Grammar School there. After completing her studies in Ljubljana, she graduated in junior literature and pedagogy at the Faculty of Education in Maribor. She is a professor of Slovene language and pedagogy. She now creates, plays sports and lives in Maribor.

Through her contemporary issues oriented works this winner of international and domestic literary awards engages young readers in individual exploration of important ethical questions. Meager writers’ fees, a teenage daughter and obese tomcats provide her with excellent working and creative conditions in her home town of Maribor. Janja Vidmar wrote over 50 books, many screenplays, dramatic texts and radio plays and has received many national and international awards for her works: The Večernica Award 1998, The Desetnica Award 2006 and The Večernica Award 2008, The Medaglia d’oro Award and The Golden Accolade at the international literary competition Parole senza frontiere in Trento, Italy 1999 and 2003. Her book, My Nina, was selected by the IBBY Documentation Centre for Young People with Disabilities, Sandvika, Norway, within the project “Important Books for Young People with Special Needs” and her award winning book, Pink, was included in White Ravens in Internationale Jugend Bibliothek Munich. She also made the IBBY Honour List 2010 with her book Angie at the IBBY international congress in Compostela 2010. Her works have been translated into German, Croatian, Serbian and Italian. In addition, two TV series and two motion pictures have been produced based on her screenplays. She also wrote screenplays for two short films for European Broadcasting Union.

== Work ==
=== Genre classification ===
Janja Vidmar's youth and YA works fall into six prose literary genres: socio-psychological novels (Baraba, Debeluška, Princeska z napako, V imenu ljubezni, Vsiljivka, Fantje iz gline, Zoo, Nimaš pojma, Uspavanka za mladega očka), socio-psychological narratives (Matic je kaznovan, Matic v bolnišnici, Matic prespi pri prijatelju, Matic je zaljubljen, Moja Nina, Prijatelja, Sence poletja, Punce za znoret, Smetiščni dnevnik, Na vroči sceni, Superzvezda, V imenu ljubezni, Manca&rock), adventure realistic stories (Zala Zgaga, Junaki petega razreda, Druščina iz šestega b, Moj prijatelj Arnold, Peklenske počitnice, Potovanje groze), horror stories (Krvava legenda, Hiša groze, Stvor, Otok smrti, Obrazi, Izgubljena avtocesta, Furija, Klovn iz Strahovskega Dola), short realistic prose (Bučko Superga) and fantastic narratives (Aknožer, Leteči krožnik na našem vrtu, Čudni vitez, Vrtiljak čudežev, Zgaga in mesto lutk, Zgaga in mačje oko).

==== The theme of her works ====
At the forefront of her socio-psychological novels and stories, Vidmar put the alienation and stratification of society. In almost every work, the author addresses various taboo topics, such as death, homosexuality, peer violence, domestic violence, eating disorders, xenophobia and the division of people by religious affiliation in a way that reveals a moral dimension. Her literary characters come from different social backgrounds, but their paths nevertheless intersect several times. Through the internal monologues and comments of a third-person narrator, the characterization of literary figures is revealed. In the works, however, we also find a considerable measure of the self-irony of the main characters, through which they try to maintain their dignity. The structure of storytelling is often synthetically constructed, and sometimes retrospectives appear to help us understand the background to what is happening.

==== Protagonists ====
The most common challenges her protagonists face coincide with motives and taboos such as poverty, loneliness, long-term violence, misunderstanding with adults and misunderstanding with peers. Vidmars works feature sudden twists, and troubled characters are commonly in conflict with the environment, stories however usually do have a happy ending.

==== Decline form socio-psychological topics ====
In later years Janja tends to write funny and cheerful stories, as in her own words she has enough of hard and moralising topics. In her later works (Elvis Škorc, genialni štor and Zala Zgaga) her protagonists are rather average teenagers dealing with challenges that most of the teenagers face. In those works, Vidmar rather uses humour than hard topics to attract and entertain readers.

=== Most visible works ===
==== Fatty ====
This novel talks about the tragedy of longing for the perfect body. Teenager Uršula causes her own suffering, tragically not of her own choice, but to satisfy her mother's ambition for winning in the modeling world (mother's failure should be daughter's success). This sick aspiration results in a serious illness. Urša is adaptable enough to pretend she is accepting the offered help and even behaves as if she plans to live healthily, but all that is just a front, because deep inside she will always think of herself as a – fatty.

==== Pink ====
Teenage Janca Vidner yearns for the things a normal teenager would wish for, like Levi's jeans and records, and yet nothing is accessible right across the Austrian border. Janca's story is an experience of growing up at the end of socialism, just before the disintegration of Yugoslavia and at the same time an experience of maturing from a little girl, a proud Tito's pioneer, to a rock girl, who loses her virginity on the day of Tito's death and makes the transition from girl to woman. A novel using autobiographical strokes on a thematic level, as clearly indicated by the name of the main character.

==== Boys of Clay ====
In this novel the topic of homosexuality, another taboo theme close to the author's heart, is revealed. The author deals with the topic with great sensitivity. The novel mainly addresses social questions connected with the condemnation of same sex love and the prejudices that the main (Aik, Little) and supporting characters deal with. The novel develops through two first person narratives of the main characters with chapters taking turns equally.

==== Elvis Stork, a Genius Klutz ====
This novel represents Janjas deviation from social-psychological topics to humour and comic novels. Elvis, an unlucky teenager, has a father that spends all his time at the gym, his mother likes to get on Elvis's nerves, his grandmother keeps pestering him to get fit, his younger sister Ella is oddly fixated on collecting creepy-crawlies, and his neighbour is so hot Elvis gets a suntan just by looking at her. Elvis is a lover who doesn't stand a chance with girls, an inventor whose inventions are useless and a babysitter whose wards have to babysit themselves. His relatively uncomplicated life gets complicated when his mom makes an announcement that turns his world upside down.

==== The Third Way ====
This is her adult fiction debut, written with coauthor, lawyer Boris Grivić. The story, in a way a sequel to Princess with a Flaw (1998), is set in the time of Yugoslav Wars and portray a young Bosnian refugee Fatima in Germany, assigned to a legal guardian, Mueller. Mueller himself is a disreputable, immoral German lawyer and criminal law scholar, alienated from himself and the world. Incapable of emotional commitment, he feels nothing when his best friend, Carsten, a former UN soldier stationed in Srebrenica, commits suicide. During their conflicted relationship, Mueller learns, through Fatima's reminiscences, about the events from 1992 to 1995 that led up to the genocide. Mueller goes back and reads Carsten's suicide note and the diary entries that describe the genocide. He begins to fantasize about seeking justice for all that happened.
