= Slovene fiction =

Type of fiction

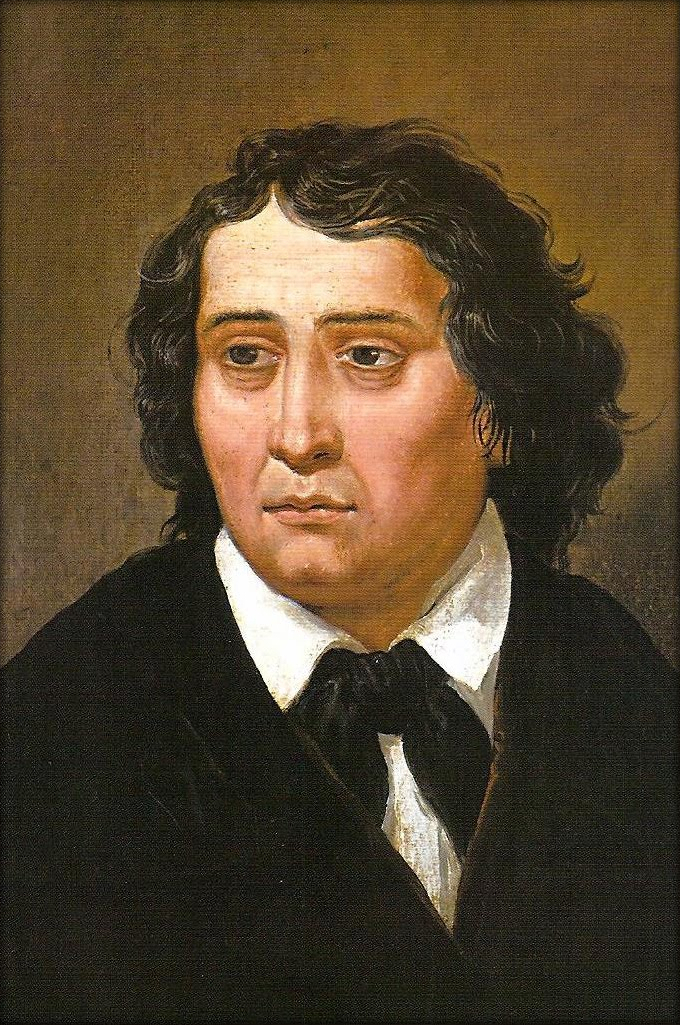
France Prešeren

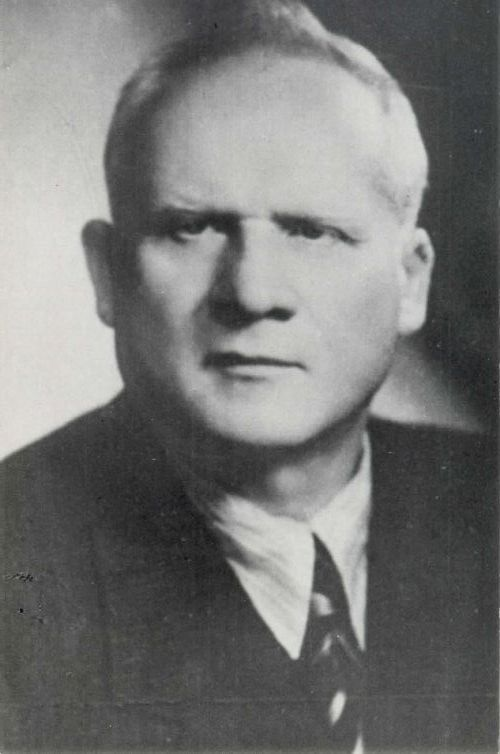
Prežihov Voranc

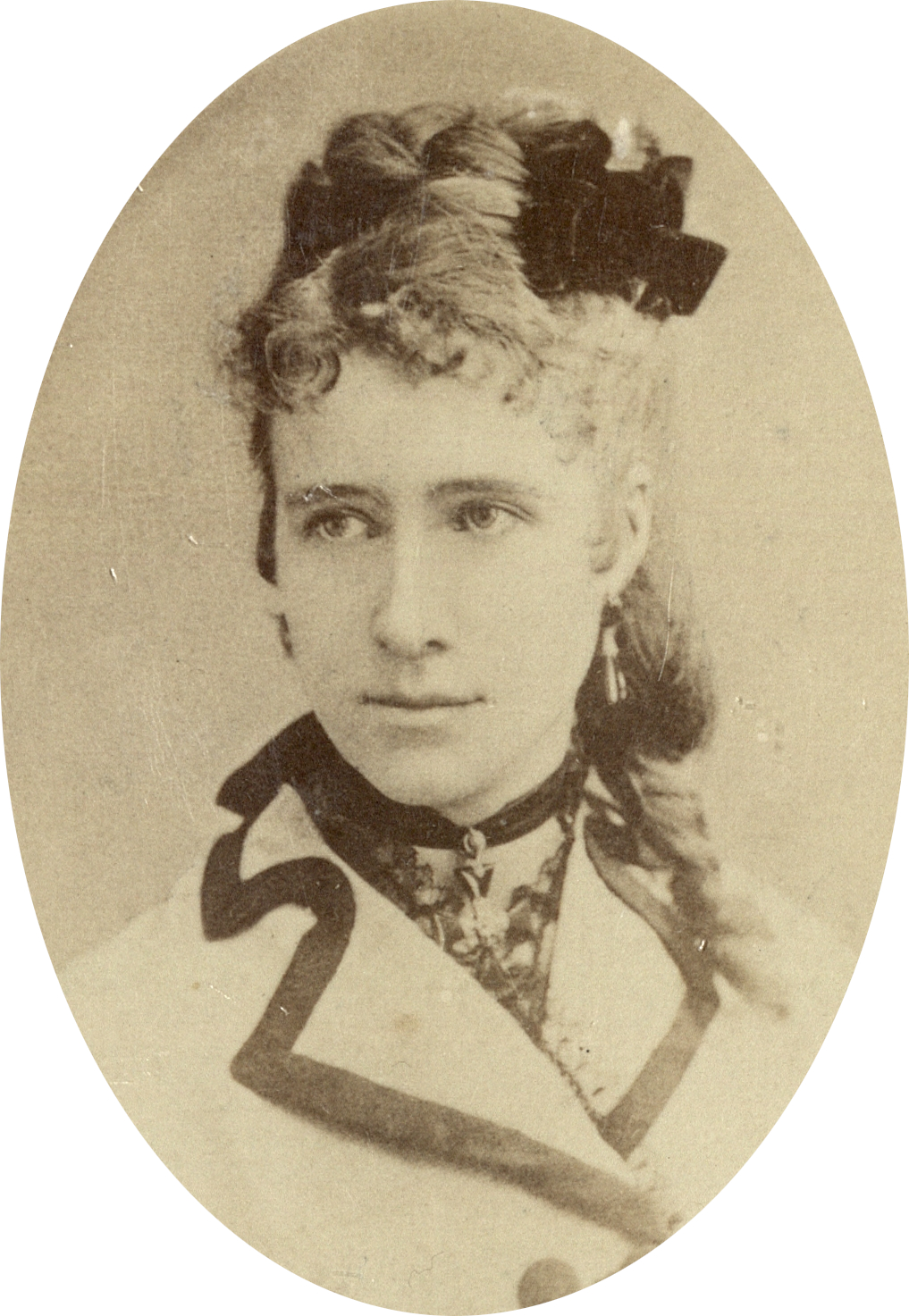
Pavlina Pajk

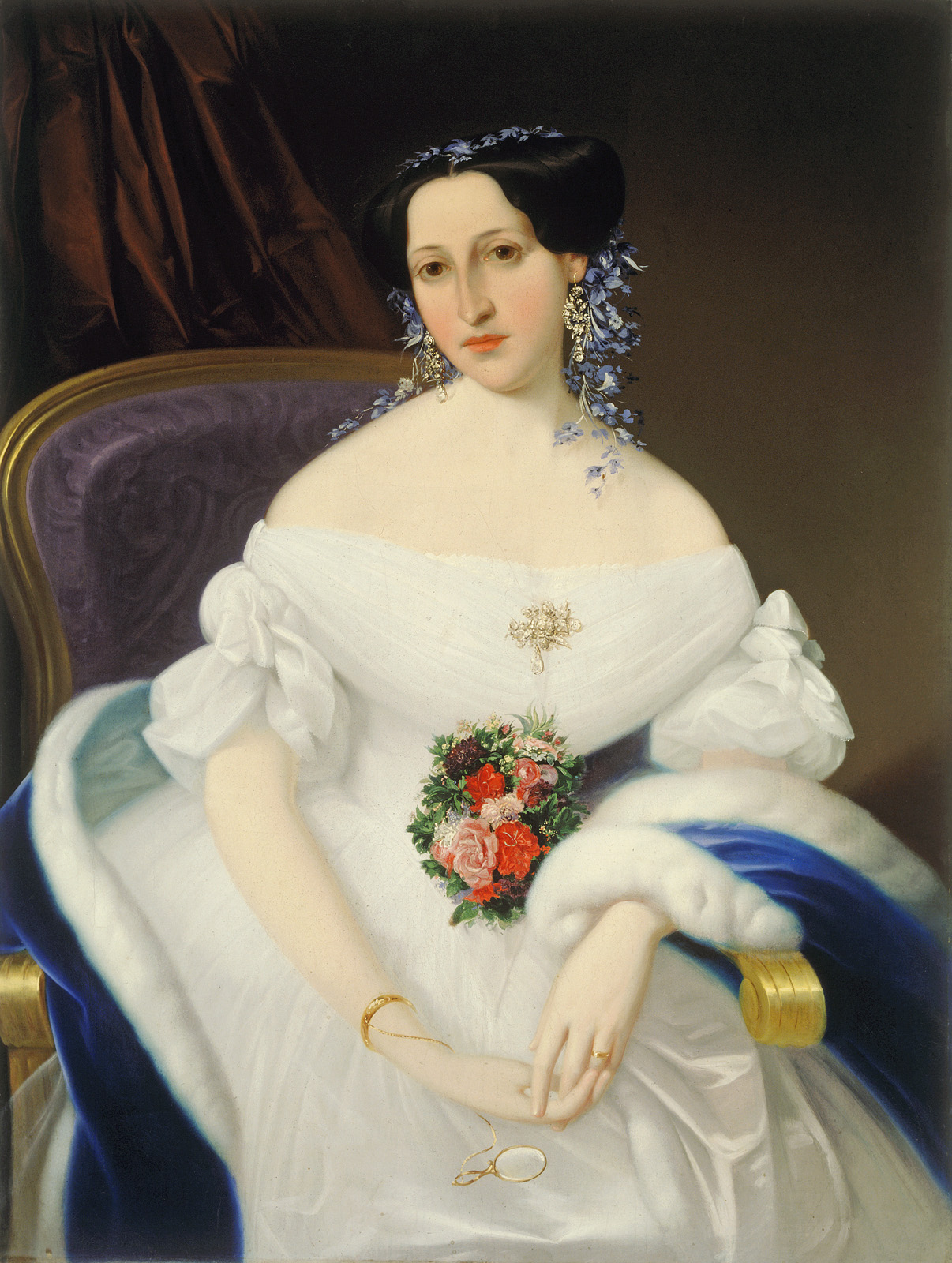
Luiza Pesjak

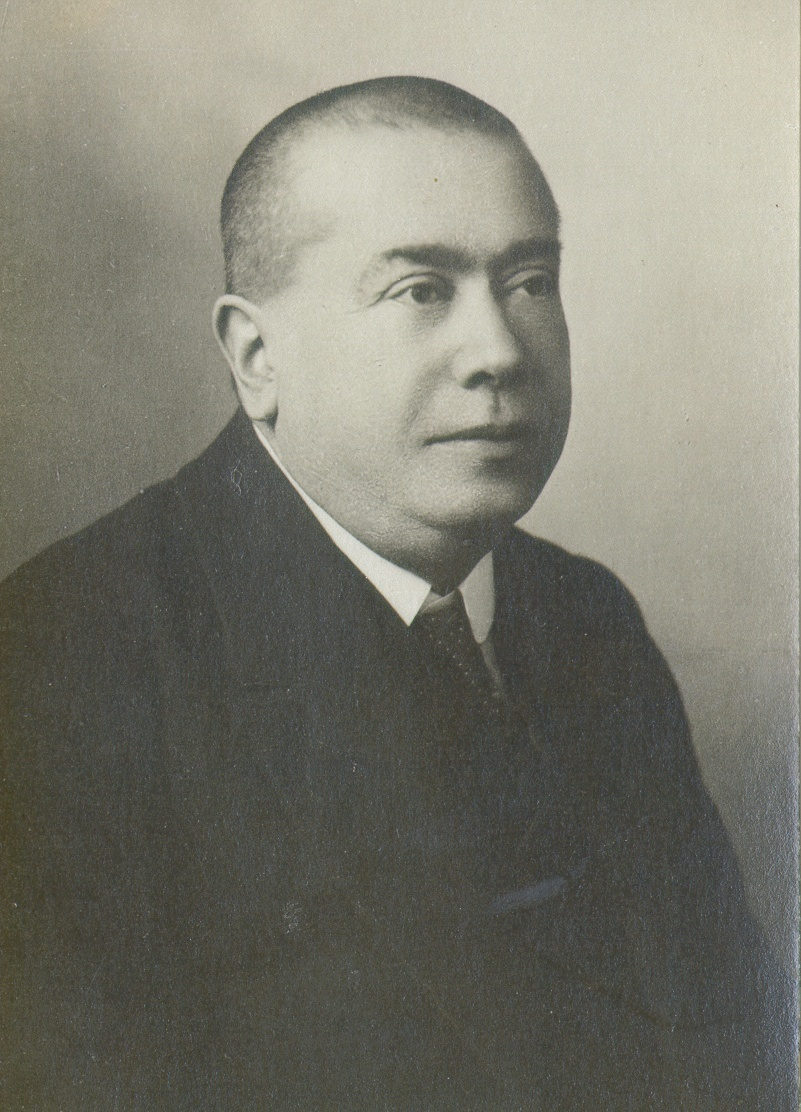
Fran Milčinski

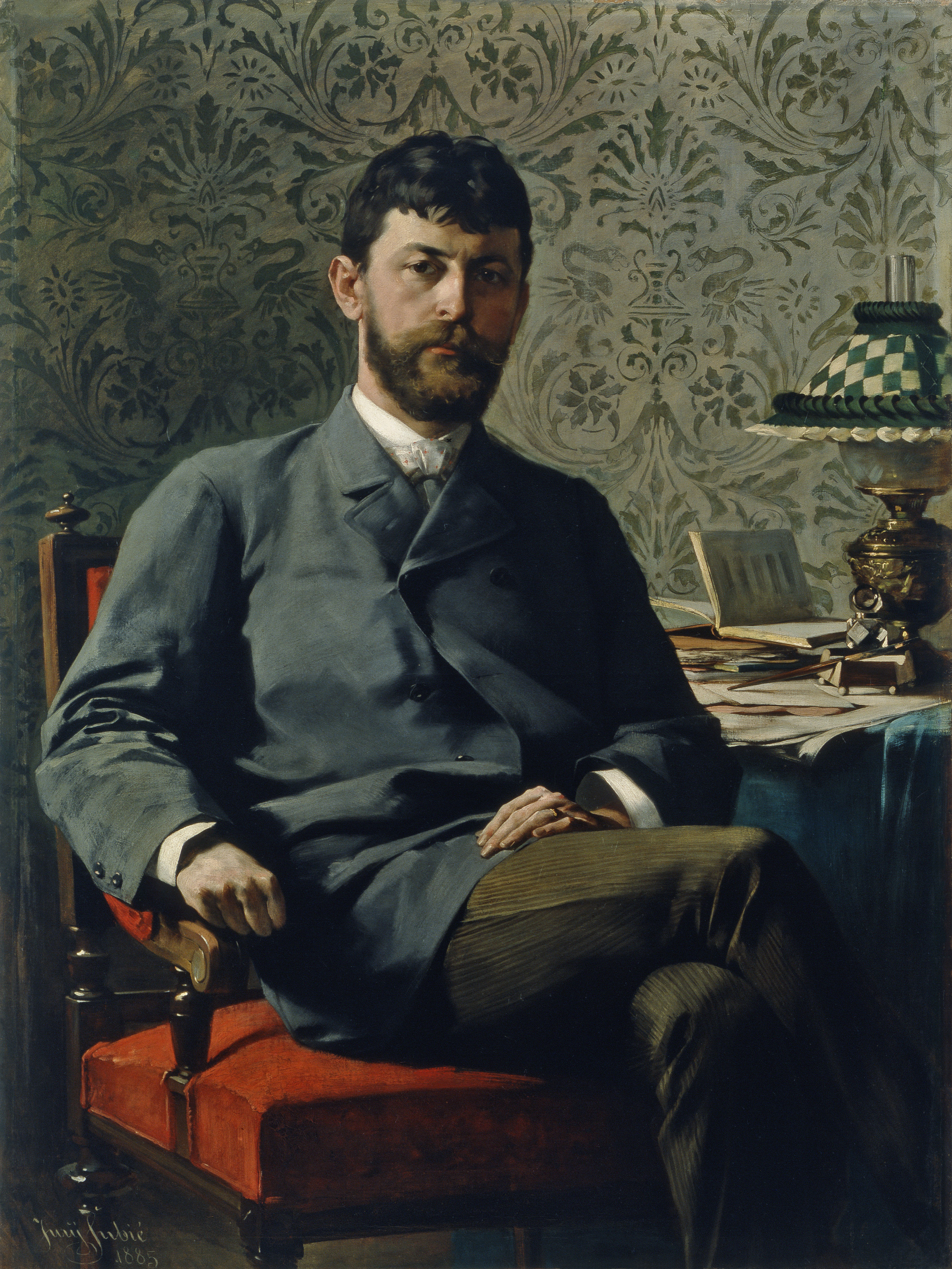
Ivan Tavčar by Jurij Šubic

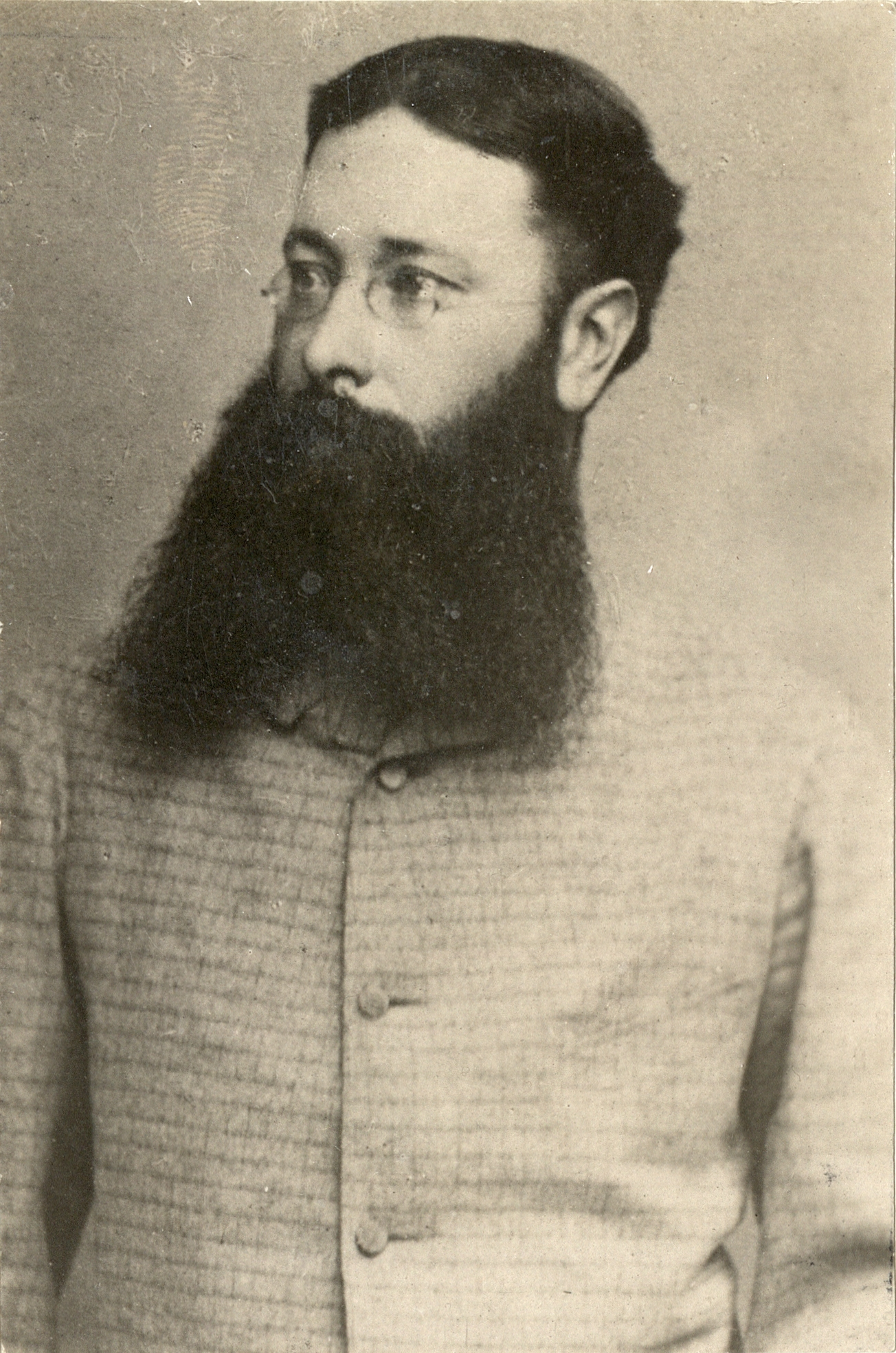
Janko Kersnik

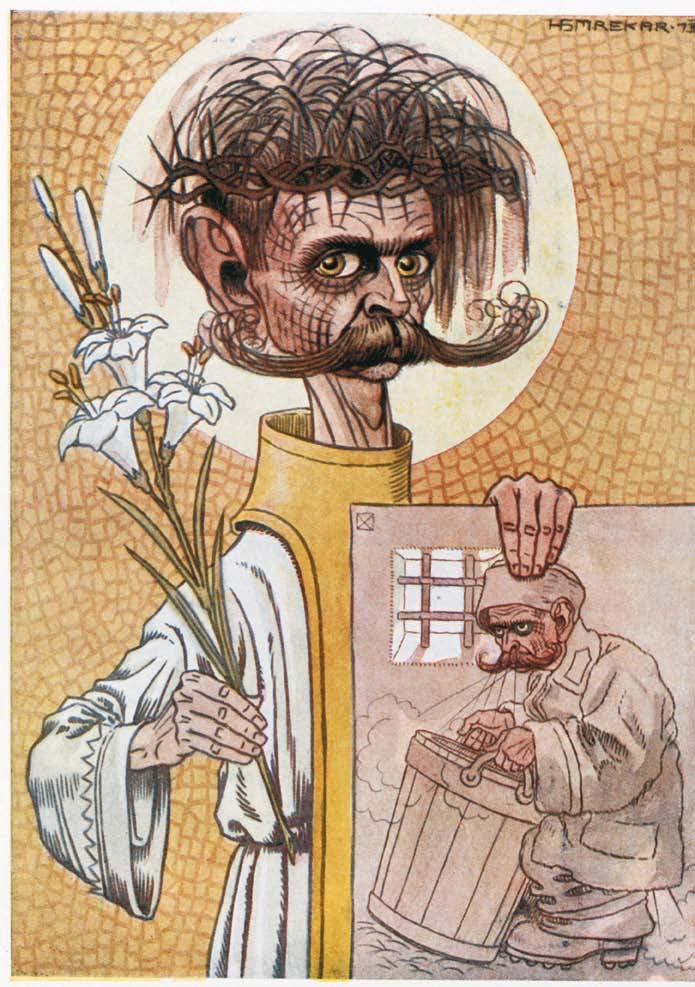
Ivan Cankar by Hinko Smrekar

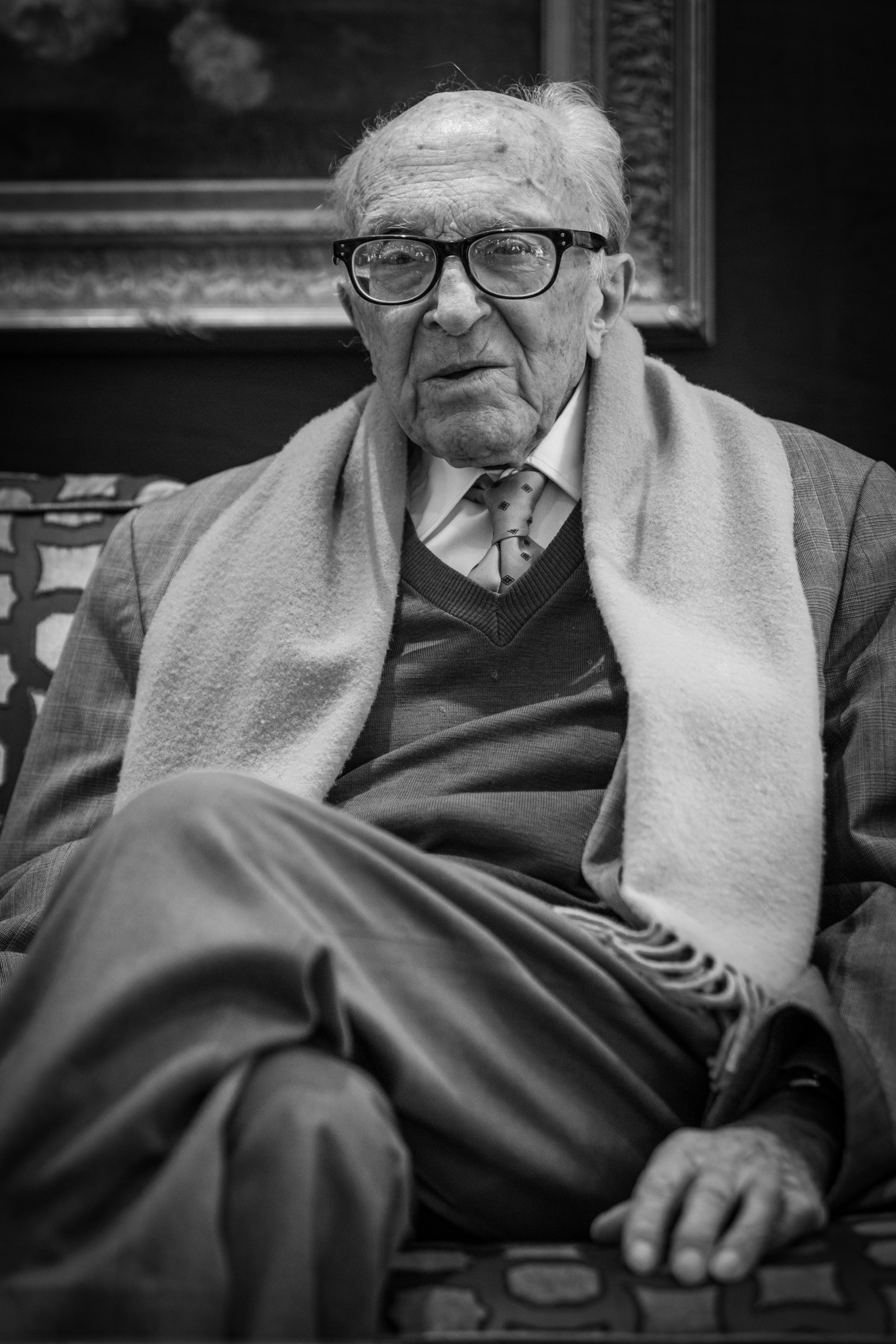
Boris Pahor

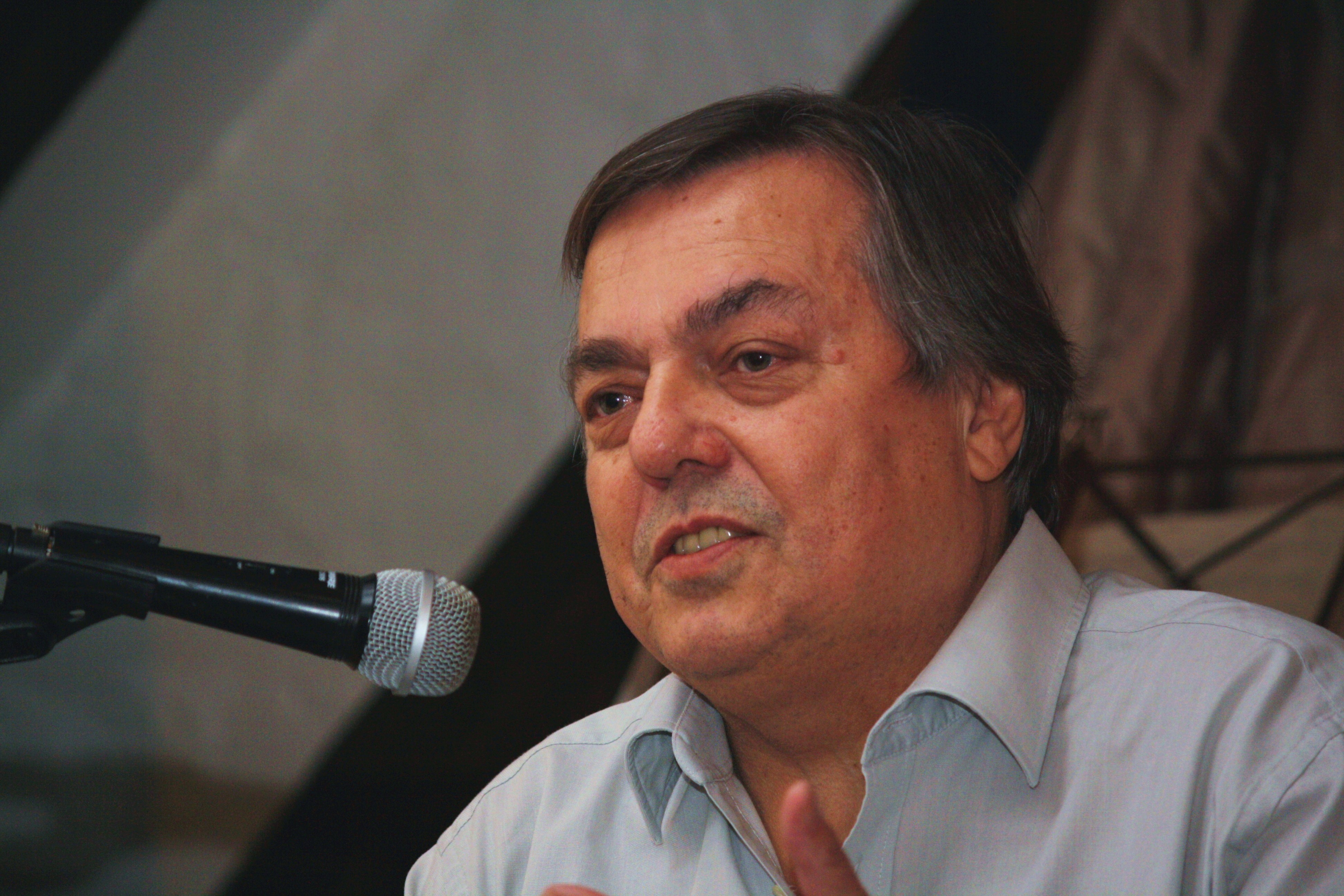
Drago Jančar

Slovene fiction refers to narratives written in Slovene about imaginary events, predominantly in literature.

== History ==
The first narratives in Slovene were translations of German Catholic educational fiction. There were legends about women's fidelity, the most popular being Genovefa of Brabant (Ena lepa ... historia od ... svete grafnie Genofefe ..., 1800), maiden stories (dekliškovzgojna povest) attesting a girl's honesty and stories about social rise of an orphan (najdenska povest). Named after the principal author, German Christoph von Schmid stories are known as Christoph-von-Schmid-tales (krištofšmidovske povesti). The first original tale of this kind is acknowledged to be Sreča v nesreči (1836), a family adventure story by Janez Cigler. Critics praised it as the ideal of folk-literature, comparing its influence to the one by Robinson Crusoe. The story earned its great popularity because of the exotic settings of France, Russia, Spain, Africa, Trieste, Vienna.

Translations of popular fiction preceded the original narrative production. Uncle Tom's Cabin by Harriet Beecher Stowe was translated twice in 1853, only one year after it was first published in America. With the exception of books aimed at a low-class reader, German narratives were not translated, as a Slovene educated reader was bilingual and was therefore also a consumer of German literature, and due to the fear from German cultural dominance against which the whole system of Slovene literature was established.

== Forms ==
There are four frequent Slovene names for short prose fiction (slika 'portrait', črtica 'sketch' – both prevailing 1890–1910 –, povest 'tale', zgodba 'story') and three standard names for long fictional narratives (povest, roman 'novel', novela 'novella'). Concerning long narratives, the term povest is considered to be nationally specific. It is predictable for the narrative lengths of 20,000–45,000 words, growing longer in time, it is plot-oriented, uninhibitedly didactic, written for uneducated lower-social-class readers and hence of minor artistic value. This definition, though controversial in its axiological part, is suitable for the majority of tales published in the series Slovenske večernice (Slovene Evening Tales) by the popular Catholic publishing house Mohorjeva družba (Hermagora's Society), in very high circulation, reaching 80,000 at the end of the 19th century, aiming the population of total 1,300,000. Three types of instruction were spread by it: religious in Christoph-von-Schmid-tales, economic in rural stories, and political (patriotic and national) in historical tales. The closest terms to the Slovene povest are povest' in Russian, Erzählung in German, romaneto in Czech, powieść in Polish, tale, novelette or long short story in English; Serbo-Croatian pripovijetka and pripovjest are more closely related to the folk-tale tradition than the Slovene povest.

=== Narratives in verse ===
Originally, narratives appeared in a verse form (ballads, romances and the epic poem Krst pri Savici (1836) by France Prešeren), but were replaced by prose; the last prolific narrative poet was Anton Aškerc (Balade in romance, 1890; Zlatorog: Narodna pravljica izpod Triglava (1904). Ivan Rob (Deseti brat, 1938) and Feri Lainšček (Sprehajališča za vračanje, 2010; Engl. translation Passages of Return, 2012) composed novels in verse. Librettos for singspiels Tičnik (1866) by Benjamin Ipavec and Gorenjski slavček (1870) by Luiza Pesjak and Anton Foerster belong to narratives, too. Josip Jurčič's novels Lepa Vida and Deseti brat were prepared for opera by Risto Savin and Mirko Polič, respectively.

== Genres ==
Slovene narrative genres of the 19th century include historical novel and rural story as its central genres, and comic tales, Frauenroman, Alpine story, detective story, adventure story etc. as minor genres.

=== Rural story ===
The rural narrative (kmečka povest, German Bauernerzählung or Dorfgeschichte) has become, besides the historical fiction, a national constitutive genre. Until 1945, 235 texts in a volume of 7.7 billion words (20% less than the historical fiction volume) were produced by 86 authors, in average length of 33,000 words (which is 69% of the average length of a historical narrative). Some authors participated in both genres, yet 60% specialized in one of both genres, which could serve as an argument that the genres were competitive. Rural stories were published in periodicals more frequently than historical narratives and conveyed more conservative messages. Another rule: the greater the author's preference for one of the competitive genres, the longer his texts in this genre.

Povest is by far the most frequent label for narratives with rural topics. Folkloric motives (Sunday, ploughing, wedding etc.) and conflicts (e.g. between the father and the son) shape the characteristic atmosphere, especially stressed in the rural idyllic story (Anton Koder, Marjetica, 1877). The rural story is about the ways how to preserve a farm, which stands for a national home. The creators of the rural story of 19th century were writers with liberal leanings (Josip Jurčič's Sosedov sin, 1868 (The neighbor's son), stands at the beginning of the continuous production of the genre), but the major part of it was produced by conservative Catholic authors, who criminalized the poor, ascribing them alcoholism, superstition, gambling addiction etc. The most productive authors were France Bevk, Miško Kranjec, Fran Detela, Janez Jalen, Fran Jaklič. In 1907, the modernist Ivan Cankar wrote his Hlapec Jernej (The Bailiff Yerney) as a positive personal version of the rural story. The classics Fran Saleški Finžgar and social realist Prežihov Voranc (novellas Samorastniki, 1941 (The Self-Sown), novel Jamnica, 1945) wrote rural stories, too.

Upper Carniola was the most common birthplace of rural tale writers (27%), followed by Coastland (22%), Styria, and Lower Carniola (both 12%). The ratio between the number of authors' birthplaces and the number of stories that take place in a particular province are correlated. A significantly higher number of authors' residences in Styria is due to the exodus of writers from the Littoral (who mostly settled in Styria) as a result of Italian fascist oppression between World War I and World War II. Slovene literary criticism has been reluctant to treat the rural story as a genre. The two main reasons are the prejudice against genre literature and the conflict between the politically liberal basis of criticism and the Catholic conservative basis of the majority of rural stories.

=== Narratives by women ===
Women writing didn't differ much from the mainstream at the beginning. Josipina Turnograjska filled her short narratives (1850–52) with pathetic pan-Slavic sentiment. Luiza Pesjak (Beatin dnevnik, 1887) and Pavlina Pajk (two dozens of long narratives, written between 1876 and 1900) introduced a Slovene version of Frauenroman modelled according to the German popular writer Eugenie Marlitt and has been hence given only a peripheral importance by critics. The genre is recognizable by a Cinderella motif, a love triangle, a happy end, an illness, and by a heroine being dedicated to a categorical imperative. Women writers were from bourgeois families while a half of the rival male classics were born in peasant families. The naturalist Zofka Kveder (Njeno življenje, 1914) is the only woman among classics, accepted not earlier than in 2005. Women authors preferred writing historical fiction: Mimi Malenšek was the most prolific in this genre, due to her biographical novels. Today, women present 37% of all Slovene novelists. They are more prolific, contributing 42% to its annual production, predominantly popular romances.

=== Humor and folklore ===
Entertaining readers with hero's humorous anecdotes was a legitimate goal of »the books for youth and folks« from the very beginning of Slovene literature (Nemški Pavliha v slovenski obleki, 1850, is a Slovene version of Till Eulenspiegel's jokes). There are only a few completely humorous long narratives: two novels by Rado Murnik and two novels by Miroslav Malovrh, both published at the break of 19th and 20th century; Fran Milčinski, who is the brand name of laughter in literature, wrote shorter texts, humoresques. Literary folklore narratives encompass several collections of jokes, fairy tales (pravljice) and legends (pripovedke) about mythical characters Kralj Matjaž, Kurent, Peter Klepec, Lepa Vida etc.

=== Other genres ===
Adventurous stories were by the great part translated, also detective story, where among domestic authors Igor Karlovšek and Avgust Demšar should me mentioned. Science fiction has been promoted by Damir Feigel in the 1920 and 1930 years, Bojan Meserko's, Sanjališče (1995) has been translated in English. The representative authors for the biographical novel, which shares its structure with the historical novel, were Mimi Malenšek, Anton Slodnjak, and Ilka Vašte. War novels after the World War II form a subgenre partizan novel (Tone Svetina, (Ukana, 1–3, 1965–69, Vitomil Zupan, Menuet za kitaro na 25 strelov, 1975). Family sagas were written by Mira Mihelič; autobiographical novels, popular love stories, Alpine tales etc. enrich the Slovene genre fiction.

== Classics ==
For the constitution and emancipation of Slovene literature its originality was important instead of adoption of the genres that dominated in the neighbours' literatures. Authors considered short narrative forms much more suitable for formal innovations as long narratives, so it is the short fiction where new trends appeared first. Short narratives were thus highly appreciated by literary critics. The Slovene literary system was founded to serve the interests of middle class and the nationally aware intellectuals, so it favoured non-rural themes. Only original narratives gained the status of classics: Janez Trdina's legends (pripovedke), Janez Mencinger's conversational novel (Abadon, 1893, Moja hoja na Triglav, 1897), Fran Erjavec's fictionalized zoological writing and travelogue, Simon Jenko's psychological short stories and humoresques, Josip Jurčič's novels about poor intellectuals trying to socially rise through marriage (Deseti brat, 1866, renowned as the first Slovene novel, Doktor Zober, 1876, Cvet in sad, 1877), Josip Stritar's sentimental novel in letters (Zorin, 1870), Ivan Tavčar's (Otok in struga, 1881, Izza kongresa, 1905) and Janko Kersnik's novels (Ciklamen, 1883, Jara gospoda, 1893) following Jurčič's model, naturalistic novel by Alojz Kraigher (Kontrolor Škrobar, 1914), with distinctive eroticism. In the 20th century, Ivan Cankar wrote social critical novels (Na klancu, 1903 and Martin Kačur, 1905) and experimented with a second person narrator in the novel Nina, 1906). Ivan Pregelj is recognized by historical novels with priests as protagonists, Slavko Grum included own deliric experiences in his short stories. Some more classics: Juš Kozak (Alpine story Beli macesen, 1926, family saga Šempeter, 1931), Prežihov Voranc (war novel Doberdob, Požganica with a group of protagonists), Fran Saleški Finžgar wrote rural tales, Edvard Kocbek has been severely criticised for his partizan novellas Strah in pogum (1951).

Boris Pahor (Pilgrim among the shadows, 1995, or Necropolis, 1910, Slov. Nekropola, 1967, a novela about German concentration camp; A difficult spring, 2011, Slov. Spopad s pomladjo, 1961) and Drago Jančar (The galley slave, 2011, Slov. Galjot, 1978; Northern lights, 2011, Slov. Severni sij, 1984) are the most translated among modern Slovene novelists, Goran Vojnović (Čefurji raus, 2009) is read the most. Maja Haderlap has written the novel Engel des Vergessens (2011) in German first and was than translated in Slovene.

The growth of Slovene novel production
| 1990 | 1991 | 1992 | 1993 | 1994 | 1995 | 1996 | 1997 | 1998 | 1999 | 2000 | 2001 | 2002 | 2003 | 2004 | 2005 | 2006 | 2007 | 2008 | 2009 |
| 29 | 45 | 32 | 37 | 29 | 52 | 71 | 84 | 78 | 77 | 93 | 88 | 114 | 108 | 155 | 164 | 149 | 143 | 184 | 166 |

== Bibliography ==
- Aleksandra Belšak. Žanri v slovenski daljši prozi. Slovenski roman. Ur. Miran Hladnik in Gregor Kocijan. Ljubljana: FF 2003 (Obdobja, 21). 151–161.
- Miran Hladnik. Slovenski ženski roman v 19. stoletju. Slavistična revija 29/3 (1981). 259–96. [Slovene petticoat novel in the 19th century]
- Miran Hladnik. Slovenska planinska povest. 23rd Seminar on Slovene Language, Literature, and Culture, ed. Alenka Šivic Dular. Ljubljana: FF, 1987. 95–102. [The Alpine tale]
- Miran Hladnik. Slovenska kmečka povest. Ljubljana: Prešernova družba, 1990. [The Slovene rural tale]
- Miran Hladnik. Povest. Ljubljana: DZS, 1991 (Literarni leksikon, 36). [Story]
- Miran Hladnik. Some Slovene literature, available in English. 1997.
- Miran Hladnik and Primož Jakopin. Slovenska kmečka povest: Podatkovna zbirka. 2000 [Slovene rural story: Database]
- Matjaž Kmecl. Novela v slovenski literarni teoriji. Maribor: Obzorja, 1975. [Novella in the Slovene literary theory]
- Matjaž Kmecl. Od pridige do kriminalke ali o meščanskih začetkih slovenske pripovedne proze. Ljubljana: Mladinska knjiga, 1975. [From the sermon to the detective story or about the bourgeois beginnings of the Slovene narratives]
- Matjaž Kmecl. Rojstvo slovenskega romana. Ljubljana: Mladinska knjiga, 1981. [The birth of the Slovene novel]
- Andrijan Lah. Mali pregled lahke književnosti. Ljubljana: Rokus, 1997.
