= Art of Slovenia =

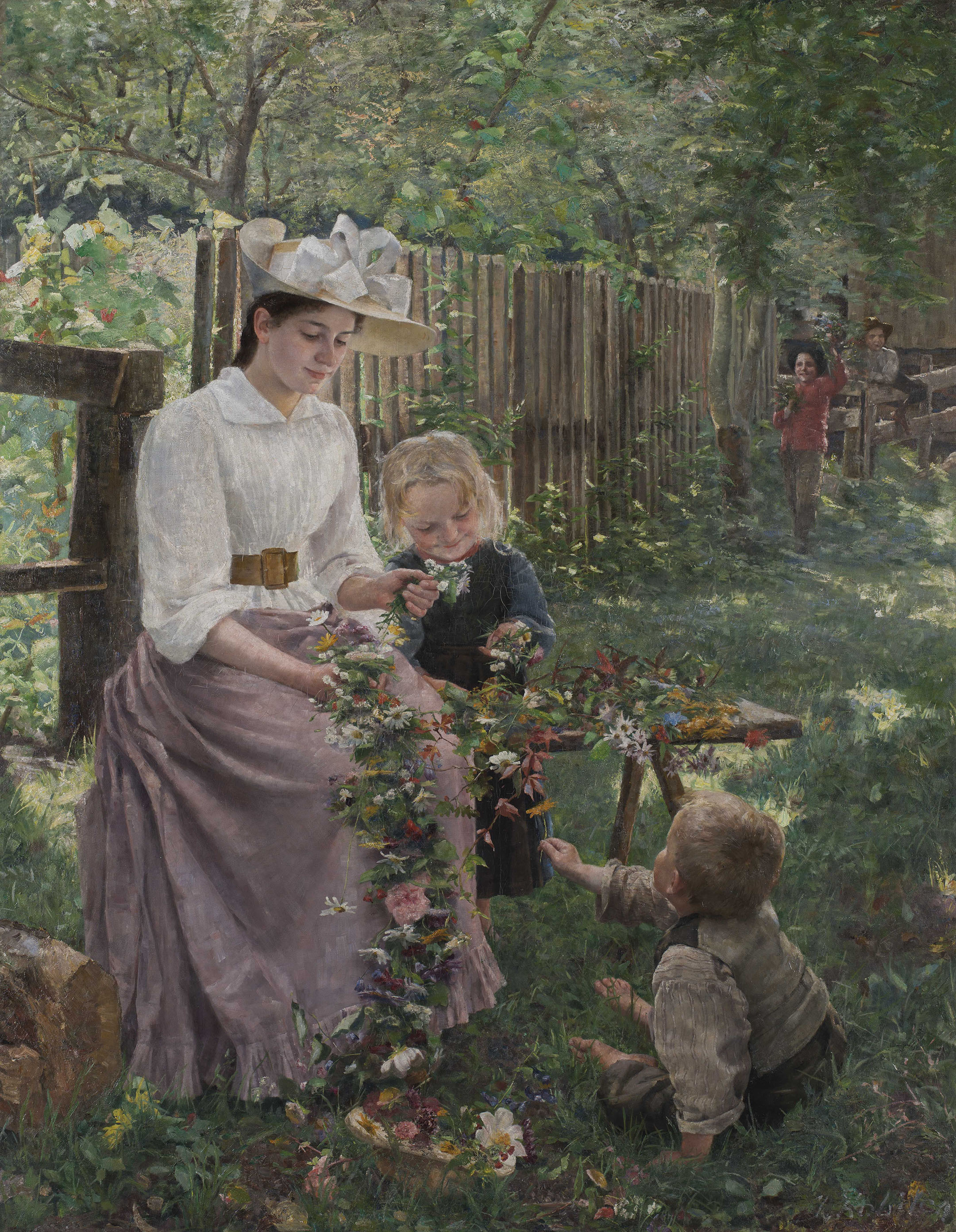
Poletje (Summer) by Slovene painter Ivana Kobilica

Art of Slovenia refers to all forms of visual art in or associated with Slovenia, both before and after the country's Independence from Yugoslavia in 1991. Art in Slovenia has been shaped by a number of Slovenian painters, sculptors, architects, photographers, graphics artists, comics, illustration, and conceptual artists. The most prestigious institutions exhibiting works of Slovene visual artists are the National Gallery of Slovenia and the Museum of Modern Art in Ljubljana.

== Painting ==
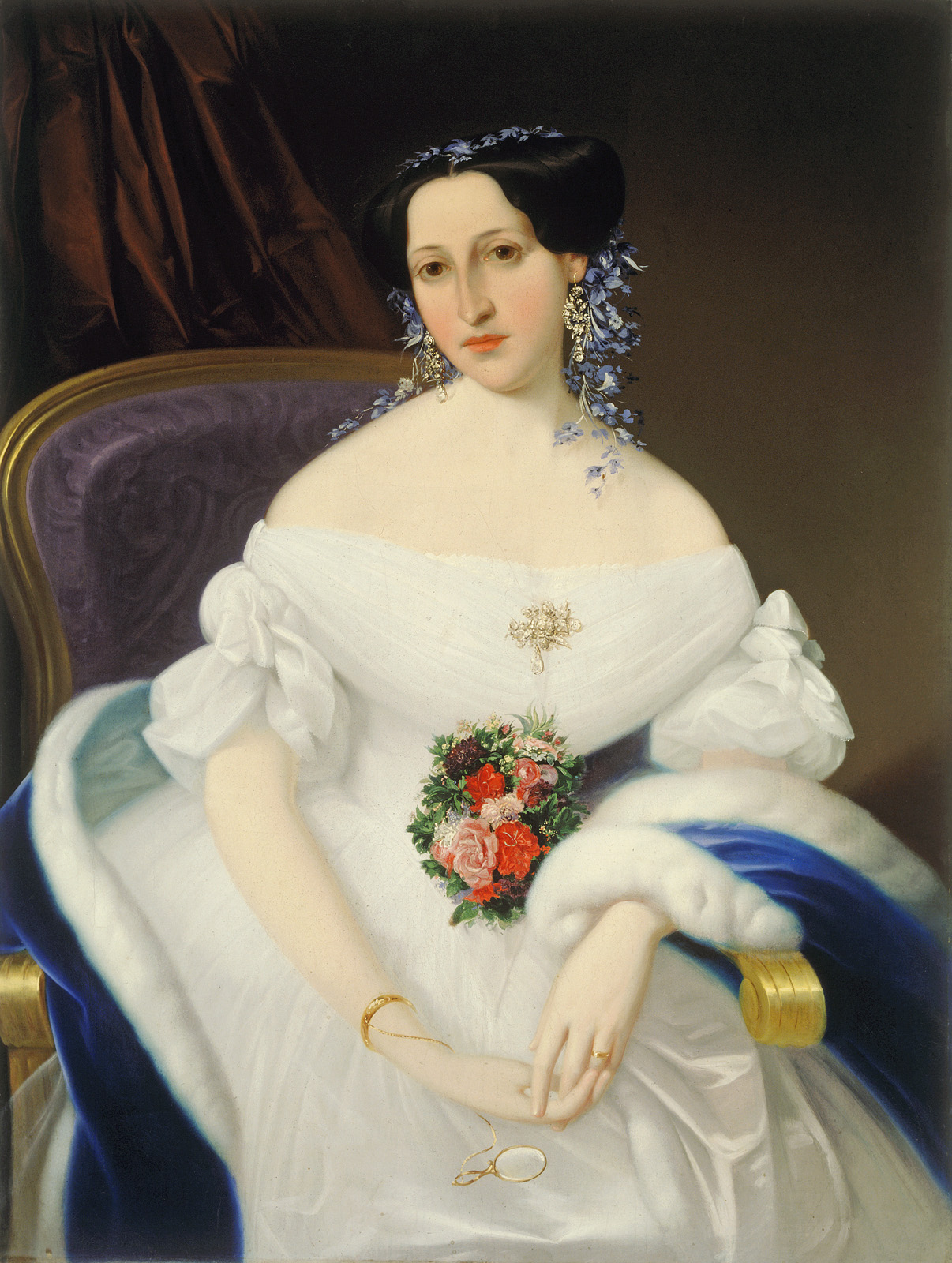
Portrait of Luiza Pesjak by Michael Stroy

Historically, painting and sculpture in Slovenia was in the late 18th and the 19th century marked by Neoclassicism (Matevž Langus), Biedermeier (Giuseppe Tominz) and Romanticism (Michael Stroy). The first art exhibition in Slovenia was organised in the late 19th century by Ivana Kobilca, who worked in realistic tradition. Impressionist artists include painters Matej Sternen, Matija Jama, Rihard Jakopič, Ivan Grohar, whose The Sower (Slovene: Sejalec) was depicted on the €0.05 Slovenian euro coins, and a sculptor Franc Berneker, who introduced impressionism to Slovenia. Expressionist painters include Veno Pilon and Tone Kralj whose picture book, reprinted thirteen times, is now the most recognisable image of the folk hero Martin Krpan.

== Sculpture ==
The renewal of Slovene sculpture begun with Alojz Gangl (1859–1935) who made the first public monument of the notable Enlightenment figure Valentin Vodnik and provided The Genius of the Theatre and other statues for the Slovenian National Opera and Ballet Theatre building.

== Architecture ==
Modern architecture in Slovenia was introduced by Max Fabiani, and in the mid-war period, Jože Plečnik and Ivan Vurnik. In the second half of the 20th century, the national and universal style were merged by the architects Edvard Ravnikar and Marko Mušič.

== Photography ==
In 1841, Janez Puhar (1814–1864) invented a process for photography on glass, recognized on June 17, 1852, in Paris by the French Academy of Agriculture, Handicrafts, and Commerce. Gojmir Anton Kos was a notable realist painter and photographer between the First World War and Second World War.

The first photographer from Slovenia whose work was published by National Geographic magazine is Arne Hodalič.

== Graphics ==
During World War II, numerous graphics were created by Božidar Jakac, who helped establish the post-war Academy of Visual Arts in Ljubljana.

== Comics ==
Milko Bambič is known for the first Slovene comic strip Little Negro Bu-ci-bu, an allegory of Mussolini's career, and as the creator of the Three Hearts (Tri srca) brand, still used today by Radenska. After the WW II the comics drawn by Miki Muster gained popularity in Slovenia.

== Illustration ==
In 1917 Hinko Smrekar illustrated the notable Fran Levstik's Martin Krpan book about the Slovene folk hero. The children's books illustrators include a number of women illustrators, such as Marlenka Stupica, Marija Lucija Stupica, Ančka Gošnik Godec, Marjanca Jemec Božič, and Jelka Reichman.

Many generations of children have been educated by the technical and science illustrations created by Božo Kos and published in Slovenian children's magazines, such as Ciciban.

Recently, Lila Prap's illustrations gained popularity in Japan where children's cartoons based on her illustrations have been televised.

== Conceptual art ==
A number of conceptual visual art groups formed, including OHO, Group 69, and IRWIN. Nowadays, the Slovene visual arts are diverse, based on tradition, reflect the influence of neighbouring nations and are intertwinned with modern European movements.

== Folk art ==
Famous Slovenian folk artists were Micka Pavlič who is most known as the painter of beehive panels, Antonija Volk Krebelj, who is most known for making Suhorje Easter eggs.

== See also ==
- National Gallery of Slovenia
- Museum of Modern Art, Ljubljana
- Music of Slovenia
