= Hladnik =

Hladnik is a Slavic surname that may refer to

- Boštjan Hladnik (1929–2006), Slovenian filmmaker
- Feliks Hladnik (1915-2002), Croatian world art collector
- Franz Hladnik (1773–1844), Carniolan botanist and schoolmaster
- Miran Hladnik (born 1954), Slovenian literary historian
