= Bobri =

1942 novel by Janez Jalen

- Author: Janez Jalen
- Illustrator: France Groše
- Language: Slovenian
- Genre: Prehistoric fiction
- Publisher: Katoliško tiskovno društvo
- Publication date: 1942
- Publication place: Slovenia
- Pages: 708

Bobri, published in three parts from 1942 to 1943, is a Slovene novel by Janez Jalen (1891–1966). An early example of both the young adult novel and of "prehistoric fiction" set in an imagined prehistoric Europe, it tells the story of a people inhabiting the present-day Ljubljana Marsh. ("Bobri" is the Slovenian word for "beavers"). The three parts of the novel are titled Sam, Rod, and Vrh ("Themselves", "The Tribe", and "The Peak"). There is no evidence of an English translation of any part of the novel as of 2025.

== Inspiration and setting ==
Jalen was a Roman Catholic priest. A subject of Austria-Hungary during World War I, he was a chaplain in the imperial army. His service in Notranje Gorice prompted a fascination in the prehistoric people and flora and fauna of the Marshes, which in turn inspired Bobri.

Jalen set the story in an imagined "2000 BCE", which he presents as the end of the "Stone Age" and the beginning of the Copper Age.

Jalen used the archaeological data available to him at the time his writing as inspiration for Bobri's setting. Remains of pile dwellings (also known as stilt houses) were discovered in the Ljubljana Marsh by as early as 1875 and were well known to Jalen and his contemporaries; exploration and study of these discoveries was interrupted by the First world war and ensuing breakup of the Austro-Hungarian empire, and then by the second world war and its aftermath.

Jalen's story includes imagined depictions of life in pile-dwelling settlements such as those now classified by UNESCO as prehistoric pile dwellings around the Alps. These were Alpine settlements built and inhabited for millennia—from approximately 5000 BCE to 500 BCE—on the edges of lakes, rivers and wetlands. Two of these sites have been identified in Slovenia, both located in the region of Ig.

In current scholarship, the UNESCO sites in Slovenia are dated to 3000–1500 BCE and 5000–2500 BCE, placing them in the transition period from the Neolithic to Chalcolithic and Bronze Age Europe. Archaeologists date the likely earliest settlement of the Marsh to the Mesolithic, when the population was composed of hunter-gatherer tribes. This way of life lasted until the sixth millennium BCE, when Neolithic pastoralists and early farmers became established in the surrounding regions. By the first half of the fifth millennium BCE, life in the Marsh began to "change drastically", as new peoples moved into present-day central Slovenia, bringing with them animal domestication, agriculture, and pottery. The minor pile dwelling settlement of Resnikov prekop is dated to this period, as is the world's earliest-yet discovered wooden wheel.

In the story, the protagonists' society is defined by clans, and each pile dwelling settlement (called "stake" in the story) comprises various clans led by a single tribal chief or headman. Cultural practices include polygyny, primogeniture, animism, and ritual warfare. Subsistence comes primarily by hunting and fishing.

== Synopsis ==
=== Sam ("Themselves") ===
Sharphorn Deer lives in a tribal "stake", or village of stilt-houses, near the "Great Lake", where leadership passes from father to eldest son. Though his father is the village chief and Sharphorn is his father's rightful heir, a rival named Stiffnecked Carp connives to usurp his birthright. Their conflict extends beyond leadership of the tribe to competition for a woman from another stake.

Sharphorn, favored by the people for his strength and hunting skill, begins building his own stake with the help of loyal followers. He expands into new hunting grounds and gains the support of his mother's clan, though he refuses their offer of marriage to one of their own. As tensions rise, betrayals and shifting alliances shape the struggle for power.

=== Rod ("The Tribe") ===
As the aging chief nears death, he urges his sons Sharphorn and Carp to end their long-standing rivalry. Satisfied that they will remain on separate stakes, the chief dies, leaving his children to navigate shifting alliances and lingering tensions.

Meanwhile, Sharphorn seeks a new wife and chooses the daughter of his servant, only to discover that his own son loves her as well. Their conflict escalates into a bitter struggle over marriage and power, culminating in a reckless act of defiance. As father and son clash, old feuds resurface, threatening the fragile peace among the stakes.

=== Vrh ("The Peak") ===
Years have passed, and Sharphorn Deer, now aging but still powerful, dreams of ruling all the stakes on the Great Lake. His ambitions are disrupted when dark-haired "Easterners" arrive and manipulate local factions to clear a path to the sea. Among those caught in the shifting power struggles is Cautious Roe Deer, a son of Sharphorn.

As Roe Deer trails the Easterners, he learns their secret of panning for gold and discovers a new clan along the Drava River. He plans to seize their land and a wife from the tribe without seeking his father Sharphorn's approval. When the Easterners arrive in force—led by the mythical figures Jason and the Colchian sorceress Medea—the stakes erupt into conflict. Betrayals and bloodshed culminate in Sharphorn's abandoning his ambition to rule the lake. Sharphorn departs to the Drava with his son Cautious Roe Deer, leaving his legacy to the next generation.

== See also ==
- Bobri (roman) [Slovene Wikipedia]
- Tatjana Bregnant
- Ljubljana Marshes Wheel
- Slovene historical fiction
