= Slovene historical fiction =

Slovene historical fiction in form of historical tale (zgodovinska povest) or historical novel (zgodovinski roman) is besides rural story the central national constitutive genre.

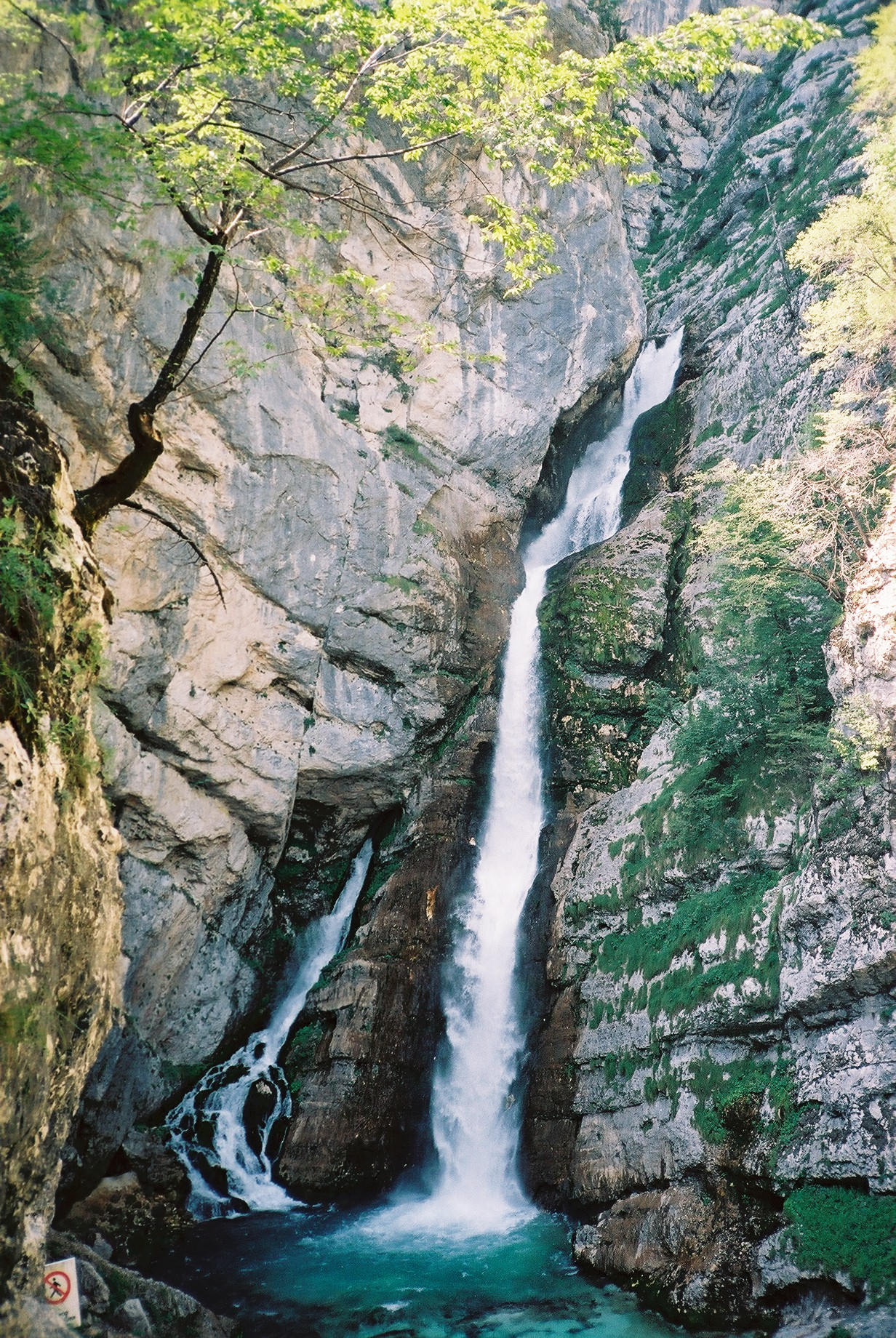
The Savica waterfall

== Epic poem ==
Slovene historical narratives started with the 500-line epic poem The Baptism on the Savica (Krst pri Savici) by France Prešeren in 1836, dealing with the defeat of the pagan Slovenes by the Christian Slovenes in the Bohinj valley in 772. Only the leader Črtomir remains alive. He finds out his betrothed Bogomila has been baptized and has gone to convent – she just kept the promise to St. Mary if her beloved Črtomir would survive the battle. Now Črtomir is easily persuaded to receive baptism at the Savica waterfall and becomes a Christian priest. Črtomir thematizes the basic Slovene national dilemma whether to stick to their own cultural identity or to accept and adopt the best from more industrious and successful neighbours. Jožef Žemlja's Sedem sinov followed 1843, printed in the newly introduced Illyric alphabet with hacheks, to more clearly demonstrate the inclusion of Slovene national epic into the South Slavic and Pan-Slavic movement. Later, narrative in verse was sporadic. In epic poetry, Anton Aškerc (Primož Trubar: Zgodovinska pesnitev, 1905, Mučeniki: Slike iz naše protireformacije, 1906) is known for persistent interweaving of historical topics into his epic.

== Historical drama ==
The historical tragedies by Friedrich Schiller were being translated from 1848 on, the original dramas by Josip Jurčič (Tugomer: Historična tragedija iz dobe bojev polabskih Slovenov s Franki, 1876, Veronika Deseniška, 1886) and Anton Medved (Viljem Ostrovrhar, 1894, Kacijanar, 1895, Za pravdo in srce, 1896) followed. Historical topic was essential for the first Slovene singspiel (spevoigra) Jamska Ivanka (1850) by Miroslav Vilhar, as well as for the first Slovene operas (Teharski plemiči by Anton Funtek and Benjamin Ipavec, 1890; Urh, grof celjski by Funtek and Viktor Parma, 1895). Some more historical dramas: Ana Wambrechtsamer, Za staro pravdo (1938), Ivan Mrak, Marija Tudor (1966), Metod Turnšek, Krst karantanskih knezov (1968), Jože Javoršek, Življenje in smrt Primoža Trubarja (1988), Miloš Mikeln, Knez Ulrik in husit ali Zvezde so mrzle (2006), Andrej Rozman Roza, Passion de Pressheren (2010).

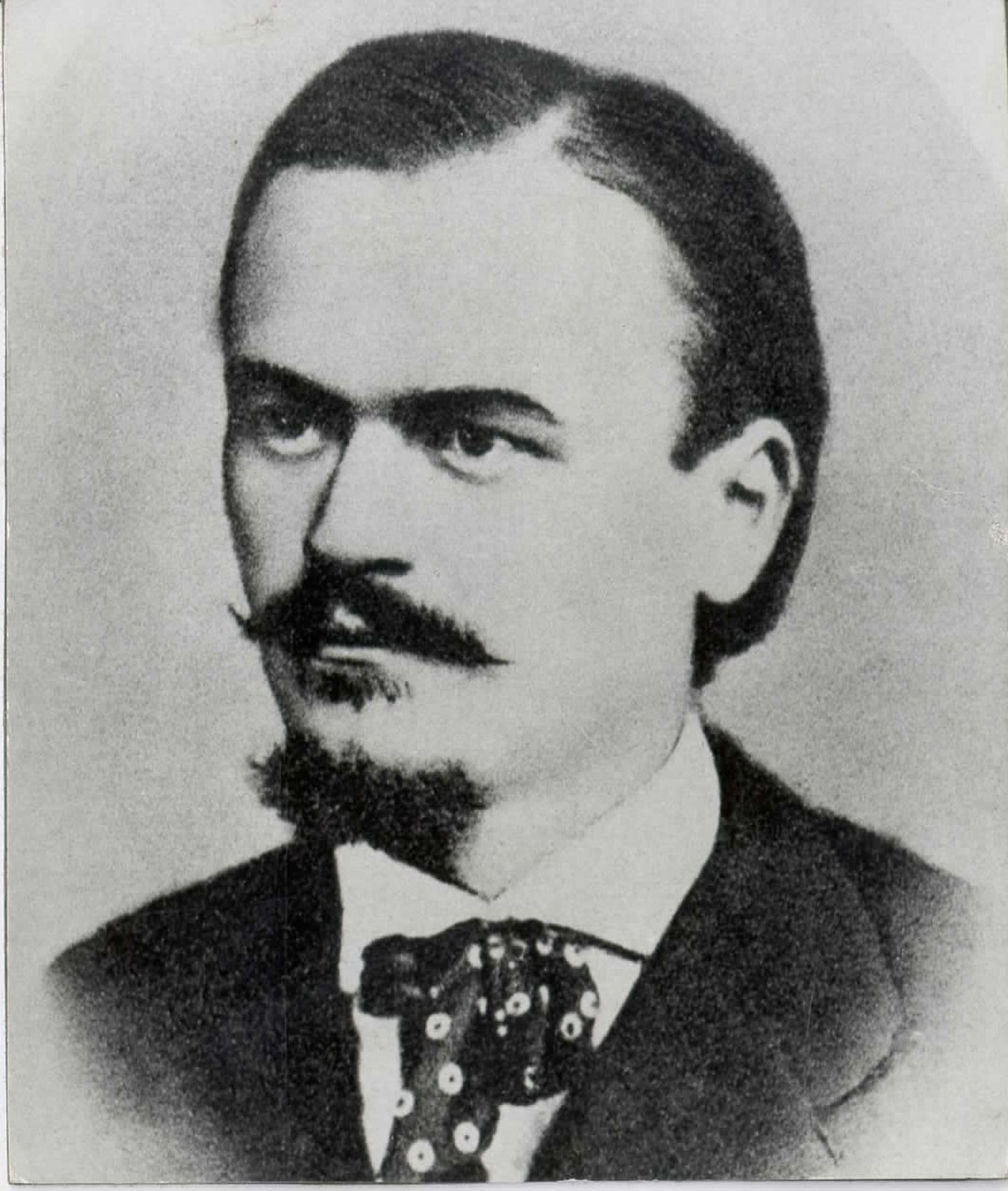
Josip Jurčič, the Slovene Walter Scott

== Historical tale and historical novel ==
The most influential form of historical literature was yet the historical narrative of various lengths. Throughout the 19th century the subtitle zgodovinska povest (historical tale) prevailed. Till 2008, 359 narratives, longer than 10.000 words, were published, with production peaks in the years 1905–10, 1925–35 and 1995–2000. 143 authors produced the volume of 26 billion words: historical narrative is the most prolific Slovene narrative genre, with the standard labelling zgodovinski roman (historical novel) since 1950. Franc Malavašič's Erazem iz Jame (1845), and Valentin Mandelc's Jela (1859) share the first place on the chronological list of texts.

Several Walter-Scott-like historical novels were composed by the »Slovene Walter Scott« Josip Jurčič who continuously produced this genre, beginning 1864 with Jurij Kozjak, slovenski janičar, the story about Turkish invasions awarded at Mohorjeva publishing house. He is also the author of the first explicit Slovene historical novel Ivan Erazem Tattenbach: Historičen roman (1873). The Walter-Scottian demand to give stories local color resulted in easily identifiable domestic geographical location.

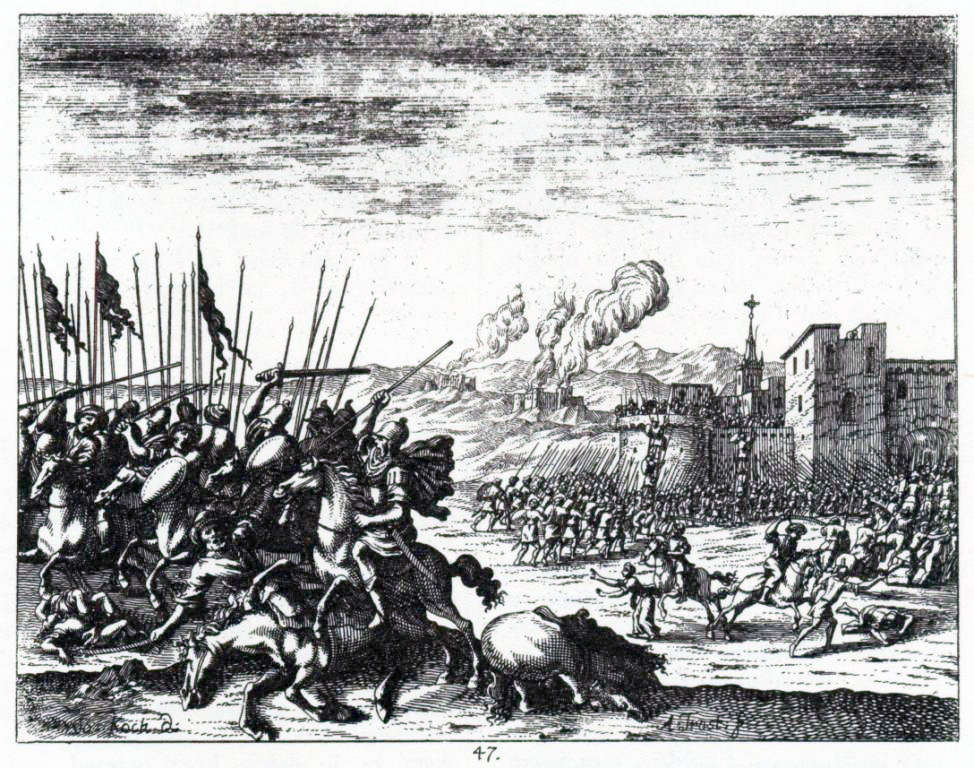
The battle with Turks, copper engraving in Valvasor's Die Ehre, 1689

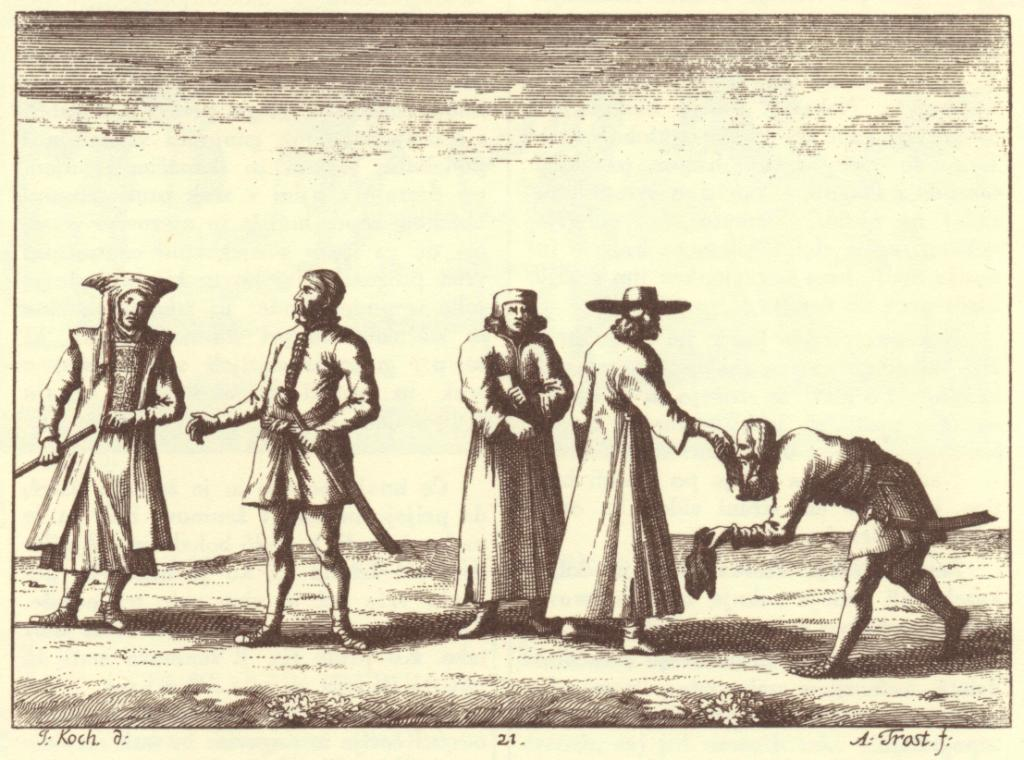
Uskoki, copper engraving in Valvasor's Die Ehre

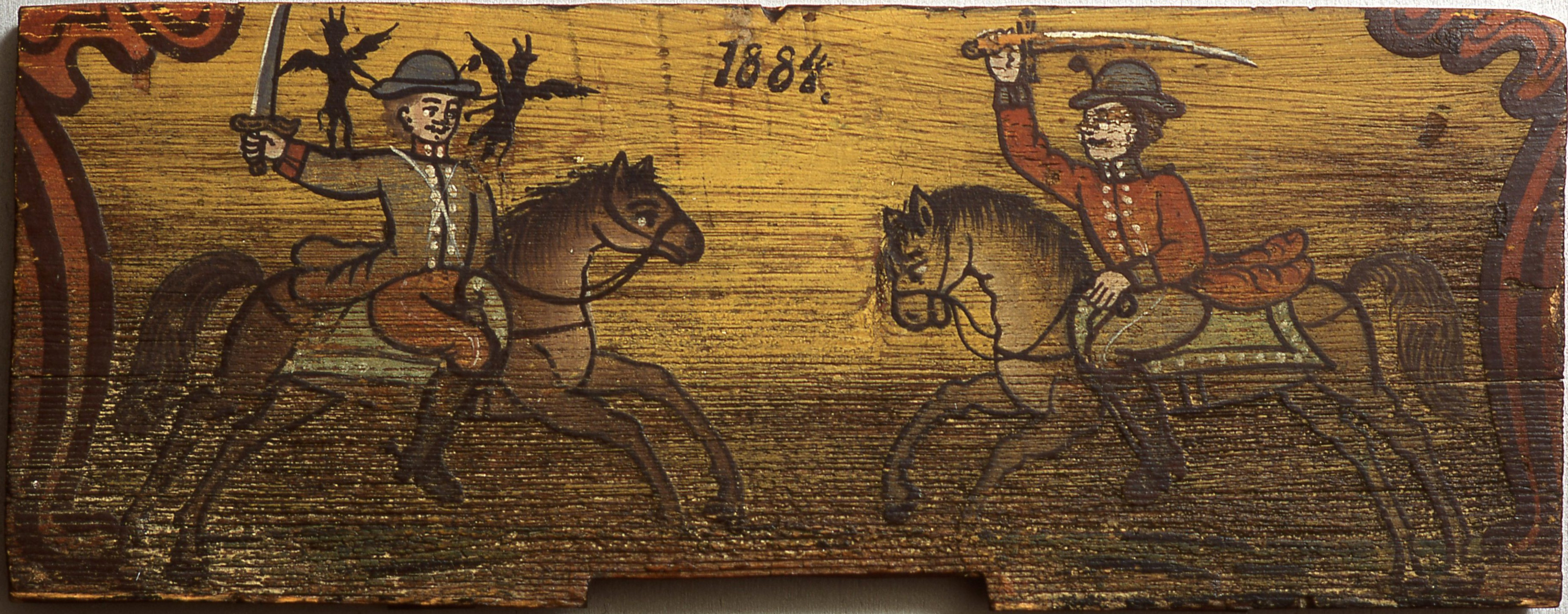
The battle between Pegam and Lambergar as a bee-hive motif

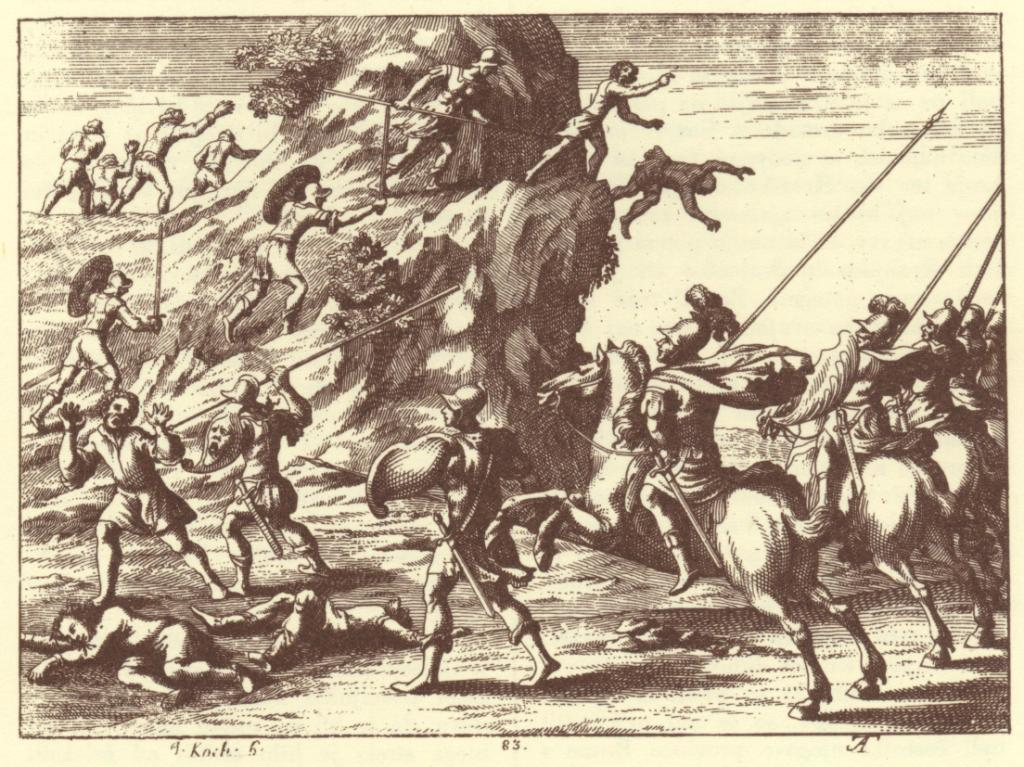
Peasant war, copper engraving in Valvasor's Die Ehre

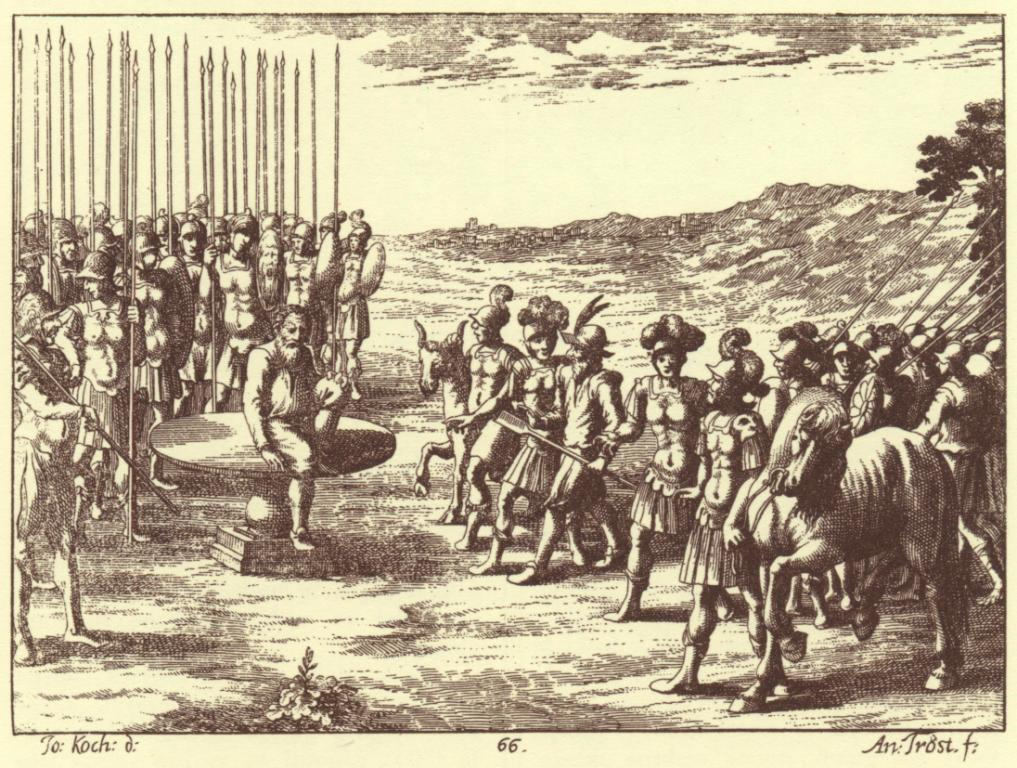
Enthronement on Prince's Stone in Carinthia, copper engraving in Valvasor's Die Ehre

== Topics ==
The most widespread and prominent genre types are the novels and tales on Antiquity (Alojzij Carli Lukovič, Zadnji dnevi v Ogleju, 1876, Alojz Rebula, V Sibilinem vetru, 1968), the novels devoted to Slavic settlement and Christianization (Josip Jurčič, Slovenski svetec in učitelj, 1886; Matija Prelesnik, Naš stari greh, 1903; Fran S. Finžgar, Pod svobodnim soncem, 1906), the chivalrous novels (Miroslav Malovrh's opus), the novels about the dukes of Celje (Fran Detela, Véliki grof, 1885; Pegam in Lambergar, 1991) who were seen as a questionable alternative to the ruling Habsburg dynasty, the stories about Turkish incursions (Jakob Sket, Miklova Zala, 1884; Rado Murnik, Hči grofa Blagaja, 1911–13) which helped to ignore domestic social conflicts, the religious battles between Catholics and Protestants (Anton Koder, Luteranci, 1883, Andrej Budal, Križev pot Petra Kupljenika, 1911, Ivan Pregelj, Bogovec Jernej, 1923), peasant uprisings (Koder, Kmetski triumvirat, 1884; Ivan Lah, Uporniki, 1906, Ivan Pregelj, Tolminci, 1915, Zadnji upornik, 1918), Jože Pahor, Matija Gorjan, 1940), local history (especially tales about Ljubljana, e.g. Ivan Tavčar, Janez Sonce, 1885), secret societies (Malovrh, Osvetnik, 1906, Igor Škamperle, Kraljeva hči, 1997), witches (Emil Vodeb, Libera nos a malo, 1911, Ivan Tavčar, Visoška kronika, 1919) and bandits (Jurčič, Rokovnjači, 1884), Uskoki (Malovrh, Strahovalci dveh kron, 1907; Lea Fatur, Za Adrijo!, 1909), The Illyrian provinces, governed by Napoleon (Fatur, Komisarjeva hči, 1910; Ivan Lah, Brambovci, 1911), family saga (Bogdan Novak, Lipa zelenela je, 1990–2000), and the most frequent of all, biographical novel (Jakob Bedenek, Od pluga do krone, 1891, about the mathematician Jurij Vega). The most prolific writers were Mimi Malenšek, Ivan Sivec, Anton Slodnjak with their biographical novels, France Bevk, Ilka Vašte. Ivan Pregelj, Josip Jurčič, Fran S. Finžgar, Ivan Tavčar, and Vladimir Bartol succeeded to become classics. Among modern authors, Drago Jančar is internationally known.

The writers of Slovene historical fiction were eager to show their historical erudition. They studied historical documents vigorously. Their most exploited historical sources were Johann Weikhard von Valvasor (Die Ehre des Herzogthums Crain, 1689), August Dimitz (Geschichte Krains von der ältesten Zeit bis auf das Jahr 1813, 1874–76) and Ivan Vrhovnik.

== Heroes ==
The purpose of the historical narrative was to constitute a Slovene national hero. The archetypal hero, Martin Krpan (1858) by Fran Levstik is a smuggler who helped the Austrian emperor to get rid of the dangerous enemy Brdavs, for which he is rewarded with the licence for transport business, thus being socially promoted from peasantry to middle class. The tale doesn't fit into the frames of historical fiction, yet and could be described as a genre antecedent. Ferdo Kočevar's Mlinarjev Janez (1859), an alternative to Krpan, who seemed not to profit enough for his contribution, rose from peasantry to nobility. Heroes (the rebel knight Erazem, the Protestant preacher Jernej Knafelj, the mythical king Kralj Matjaž etc.) were usually less successful in resolving social conflicts than heroines (e.g. Sabinka, slovenska junakinja, 1876).

Historical fiction presented the Slovenes in relation to other nations and offered them different strategies for dealing with the Other: the elimination of the Other (which happened seldom – due to the insignificant social power of the nation), ignoring the Other (this strategy was promoted by the popular Catholic publishing house Mohorjeva), adaptation to the Other (e.g. Prešeren's model), or assimilation of the Other.

== Formal features of historical fiction ==
The narrated time in Josip Jurčič's historical novels encompasses 3 years and in his historical tales 4,4 years, which doesn't comply with the theoretical postulate about novels which should present the whole hero's life and tales which should cover just a part of it. The length of historical narrative grew longer and longer, the average length is 71.700 words. Referring to the complete production till today, the writers from Styria decided twice more frequently for this genre compared to the writers from Carniola who preferred rural topics, and the share of women among writers was 3–4-times higher than in the rural story, still being 12% only. There are 6–9 settings (the characters of historical novels were considerably more mobile than the characters in rural stories) and 10–13 persons in each historical narrative. The direct speech encompasses 50% of the text, historical facts (persons of dates) are sometimes just mentioned, as in Jurčič's Lepa Vida (1877), and sometimes they occupy up to one third of a text (as in Ivan Erazem Tattenbach) due to erudite historical knowledge. 25% of texts in the corpus are literally subtitled as roman (novel) 38% are called povest (story or tale). The subtitle novel, when chosen to denote narratives in the 19th century, applied to historical narratives in 60% cases.

== Translated novels ==
Both the translated novels as well as the foreign-language novels were equally consumed by the 19th-century bilingual Slovene urban readers (i.e. Slovene- and German-speaking). Historical topics were introduced into the Slovene prose narrative in 1831 by Christoph von Schmid, however, it wasn't labelled as historical fiction but rather as a religious educational tale. Slavic writers were favoured till 1919: Michał Czajkowski, Henryk Sienkiewicz among the Poles, Prokop Chocholoušek, Alois Jirásek and Václav Beneš-Třebízský among the Czechs, Gogol, Leo Tolstoy, Pushkin, Merezhkovsky among the Russians. Croatian books were read in the original version and weren't translated till the late 19th century: August Šenoa, Velemir Deželić, Evgen Tomić. As an exception, the popular non-Slavic writers Edward Bulwer-Lytton (Rienzi and The last days of Pompei), Michel Zévaco, Benjamin Disraeli and Alexandre Dumas were translated into Slovene. A few Slovene historical tales were translated into other languages: Josip Jurčič's Jurij Kozjak and Ivan Erazem Tattenbach, Fran S. Finžgar's Pod svobodnim soncem, Tavčar's Visoška kronika, Jože Pahor's Serenissima, Vladimir Bartol's Alamut, Janez Jalen's Bobri, Drago Jančar's Galjot and Katarina, pav in jezuit, Florjan Lipuš, Stesnitev, Dušan Merc's Galilejev lestenec, Alojz Rebula's Maranatha ali Leto 999.

== Bibliography ==
- Miran Hladnik. Slovenski zgodovinski roman: Podatkovna zbirka. 1999. [The Slovene historical novel: Database]
- Miran Hladnik. Slovenski zgodovinski roman (2009). [The Slovene historical novel]

== See also ==
- Slovene fiction
