= Stroy =

Stroy (or Stroj) is a surname. Notable people with the surname include:

- Esther Stroy (born 1953), American track and field athlete
- Michael Stroy (1803–1871), Slovene painter
