= Toussaint Hočevar =

Slovenian-American economic historian

Toussaint Hočevar (25 June 1927 – 21 April 1987) or Toussaint Hocevar was a Slovenian American economic historian.

== Biography ==
Hočevar was born in Ljubljana, Slovenia, then part of the Kingdom of Serbs, Croats and Slovenes. He spent his childhood in the small town of Vrhnika near Ljubljana, where his father served as mayor. Between 1937 and 1941 Toussaint attended an elite private Roman Catholic high school in the town of Bol on the Dalmatian island of Brač administered by the Dominican order. After the Axis invasion of Yugoslavia in April 1941, he moved back to Slovenia and continued his studies at the Bežigrad Grammar School in Ljubljana, graduating in 1945. In 1946, he enrolled in the University of Ljubljana. The same year, however, he decided to leave Communist Yugoslavia and immigrate to the neighbouring Austria. In 1951, he graduated from economy at the University of Innsbruck. The same year he moved to the United States, continuing his studies at the University of Chicago.

In 1957, he became professor at the Northern State University in Aberdeen, South Dakota. In 1960, he started teaching at Keuka College in New York, in 1966 at the Florida State University, and then at the University of New Orleans where he stayed until his death. He died in New Orleans, Louisiana, in 1987, and was buried in Santa Rosa Beach, Florida.

== Academic achievements ==
Hočevar was one of the foremost researchers of the economic history of the Slovene Lands and of the western Balkans. He was one of the co-founders of the Society for Slovene Studies. He lectured at numerous universities in Central Europe, including LMU Munich, the University of Klagenfurt, and the University of Ljubljana. The Toussaint Hocevar Memorial Award granted by the University of New Orleans is named after him.

Besides numerous treatises in history, economy and system theory, he was also the co-author, together with Miran Hladnik, of a popular manual of Slovene language for travelers, which was published posthumously in 1988.

== Major works ==
- Slovenia's Role in Yugoslav Economy (Columbus, Ohio, 1964);
- The Structure of the Slovenian Economy 1848-1963 (New York, 1965);
- Slovenski družbeni razvoj ("The Slovenian Social Development"; New Orleans, 1979);
- The European Monetary System : Its Evolution and Impact, together with Ivan Ribnikar (New Orleans, 1982);

== Sources and references ==
- Alessio Lokar, In honor of the memory of Toussaint S. Hočevar. New York: Society for Slovene Studies, 1989.
