= Miran Hladnik =

Slovenian literary historian (born 1954)

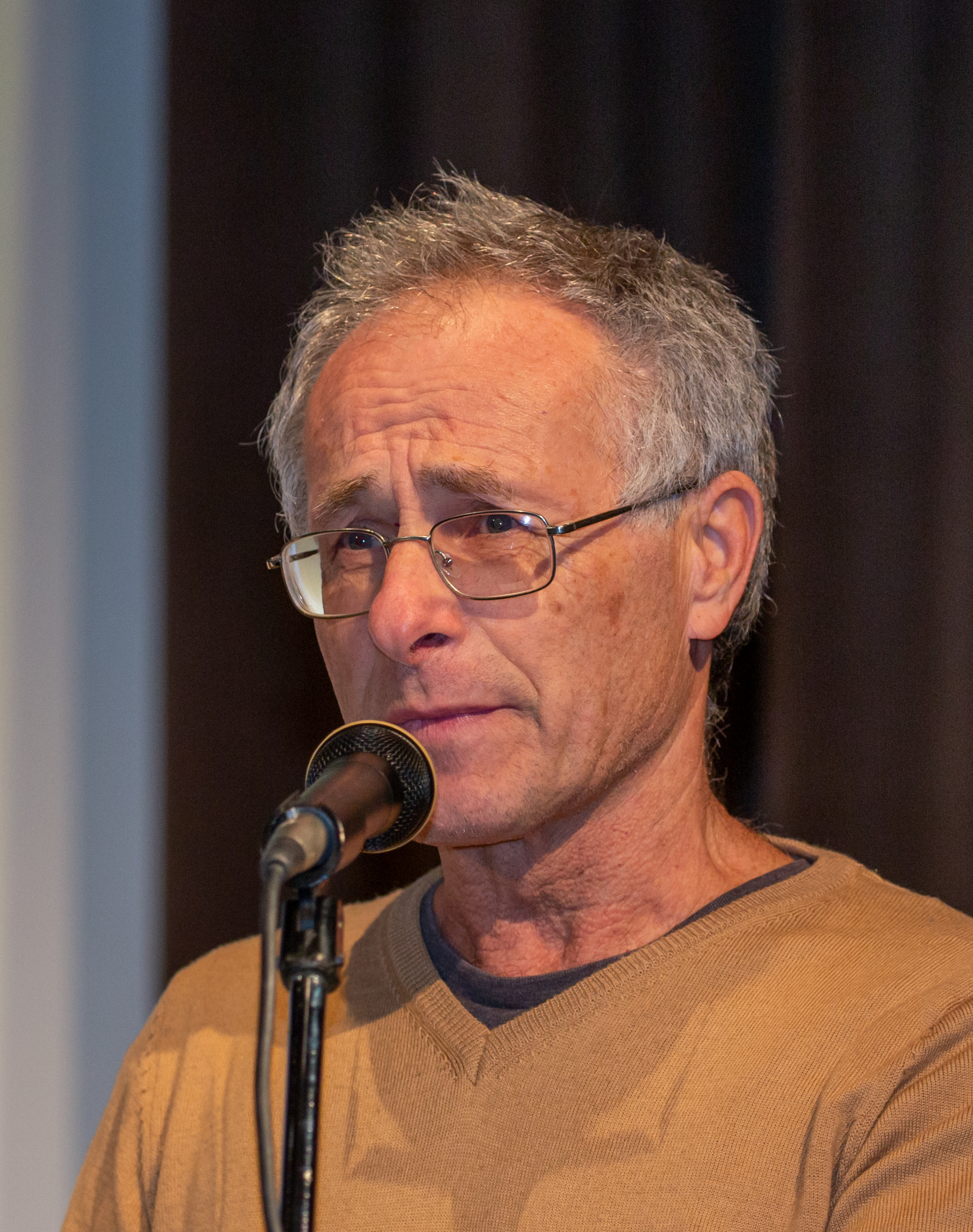
- Hladnik in 2022
- Born: 19 December 1954 (age 71); Jesenice, PR Slovenia, FPR Yugoslavia
- Scientific career
- Fields: Literary history
- Workplaces: University of Ljubljana

Miran Hladnik (born 19 December 1954) is a Slovenian literary historian, specializing in quantitative analysis of Slovene rural stories and in Slovene historical novel.

== Life and work ==
Miran Hladnik was born in Jesenice, People's Republic of Slovenia (then part of the Federal People's Republic of Yugoslavia). He studied at the University of Ljubljana, where he graduated from comparative literature and Slovene language in 1978.

In 1984/1985, Hladnik spent the academic year at University of Kansas, United States, as Fulbright teaching assistant, teaching Slovene language at the university and also teaching the language in both Kansas City and Pittsburgh, to the local American Slovenes communities.

In 1988, Hladnik obtained his PhD at the University of Ljubljana with a thesis on Slovene rural story.

The 26 million words Slovene rural stories corpus is now part of FidaPLUS.

In 1989/1990, Hladnik spent the academic year at University of Göttingen, Germany, and again as Fulbright teaching assistant in 1994/1995 at University of Kansas. From 1989, he has taught at the University of Ljubljana.

In 1995 he started with the weekly e-news of Slavic languages and literature department, which was replaced by Slovlit, e-mailing-list based discussion forum in 1999. Hladnik has also adopted the web as his publishing platform and has been publishing his academic and teaching material under the Creative Commons license on Wikisource and Wikiversity, while encouraging his students and his colleagues to the same through various Wikiprojects. He was awarded the Primož Trubar Prize for exceptional merit in preserving the Slovenian written heritage in 2017, for his effort in digitization of Slovene texts and their analysis using modern computer tools. In 2020 he obtained the Tone Pretnar Award, the honorary title Ambassador of Slovenian literature and language, for the founding and two decades of tireless moderation of Slovlit. As of 2020 Slovlit is the central Slovenian information medium for the literary and Slovenian studies.

== Selected bibliography ==
- 1983. Trivialna literatura. Ljubljana: DZS (Literarni leksikon, 21). 127 pp. COBISS 11190273
- 1984–2008. Alojz Gradnik, Zbrano delo (Collected works), 1–5. Co-edited with Tone Pretnar. Ljubljana: DZS, Maribor: Litera.
- 1990. Slovenska kmečka povest. [Slovene rural novel.] Ljubljana: Prešernova družba. 205 pp. COBISS 20910592
- 1991. Povest. [Story.] Ljubljana: DZS (Literarni leksikon, 36). 93 pp. COBISS 23450624
- 1993. Fuk je Kranjcem v kratek čas: Antologija slovenske pornografske poezije s pripovednim dodatkom. 2nd, updated edition. Ljubljana: Mihelač. 203 pp. Notes 143–193. Co-edited with Marjan Dolgan.
- 1994. (co-authored with Toussaint Hočevar) Slovene for Travelers / Slovenščina za popotnike. Kranj. 148 pp. (2nd edition.)
- 1998. Novice Oddelka za slovanske književnosti na Filozofski fakulteti Univerze v Ljubljani ali Kronika ljubljanske slavistike 1996–1998. Ljubljana: Odddelek za slovanske jezike in književnosti. 206 str.
- 2002. Praktični spisovnik ali Šola strokovnega ubesedovanja: Vademekum za študente slovenske književnosti, zlasti za predmet Uvod v študij slovenske književnosti (6th, updated edition). Ljubljana: Faculty of Arts. 311 pp. COBISS 115795968
- 2009. Slovenski zgodovinski roman. [Slovene historical novel.] Ljubljana: Znanstvena založba, Faculty of Arts. 356 pp. COBISS 245948160
- 2016. Nova pisarija [New scripture: Textbook on writing in wikis.] Wikibooks.
