= Michael Stroy =

Slovenian painter (1803–1871)

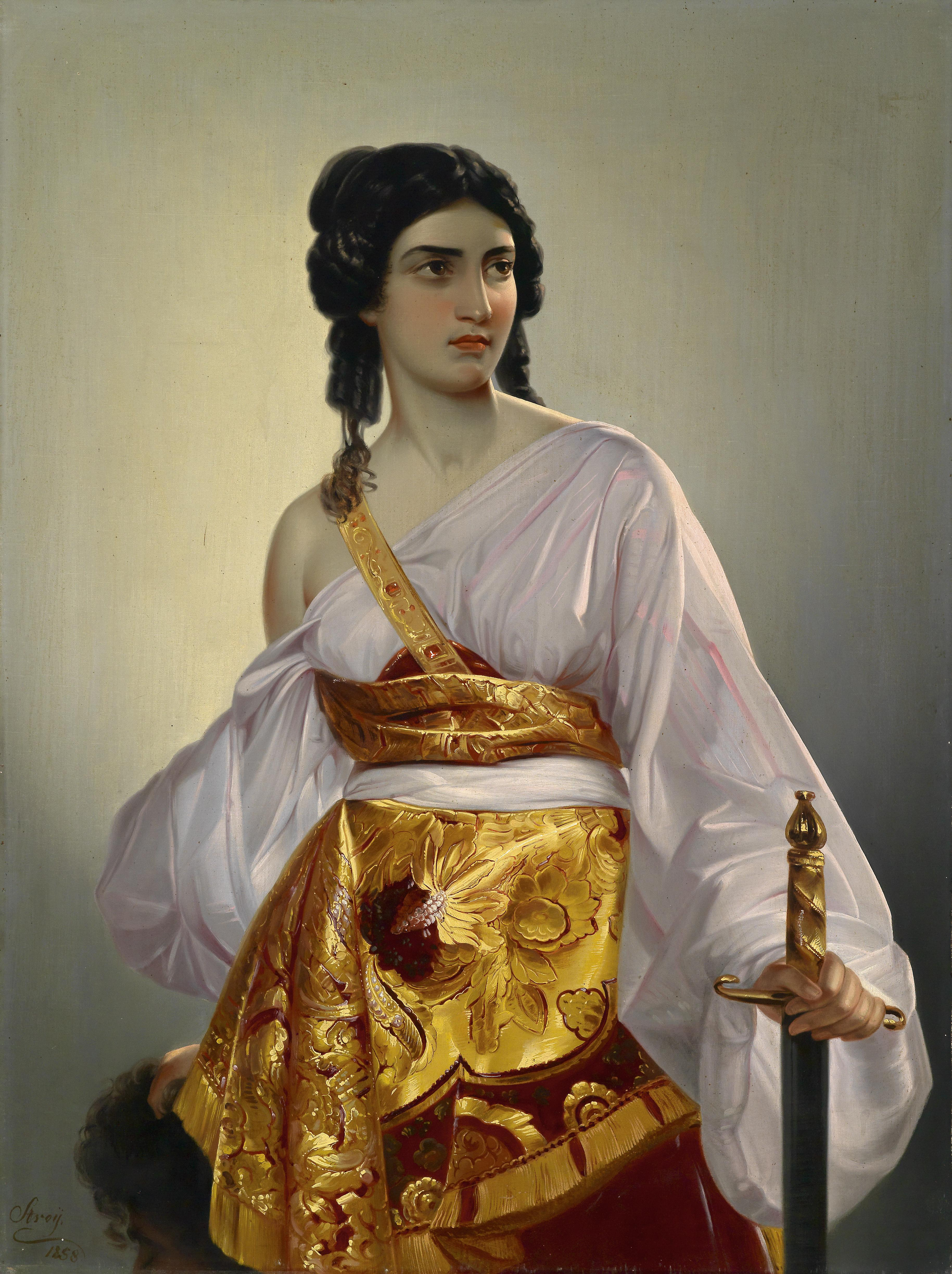
Michael Stroy: Judith with Holofernes's head

Michael Stroy (Slovenized: Mihael Stroj, 30 September 1803 in Ljubno – 19 December 1871 in Ljubljana) was an Austro-Hungarian painter of Slovenian origin.

== Life ==
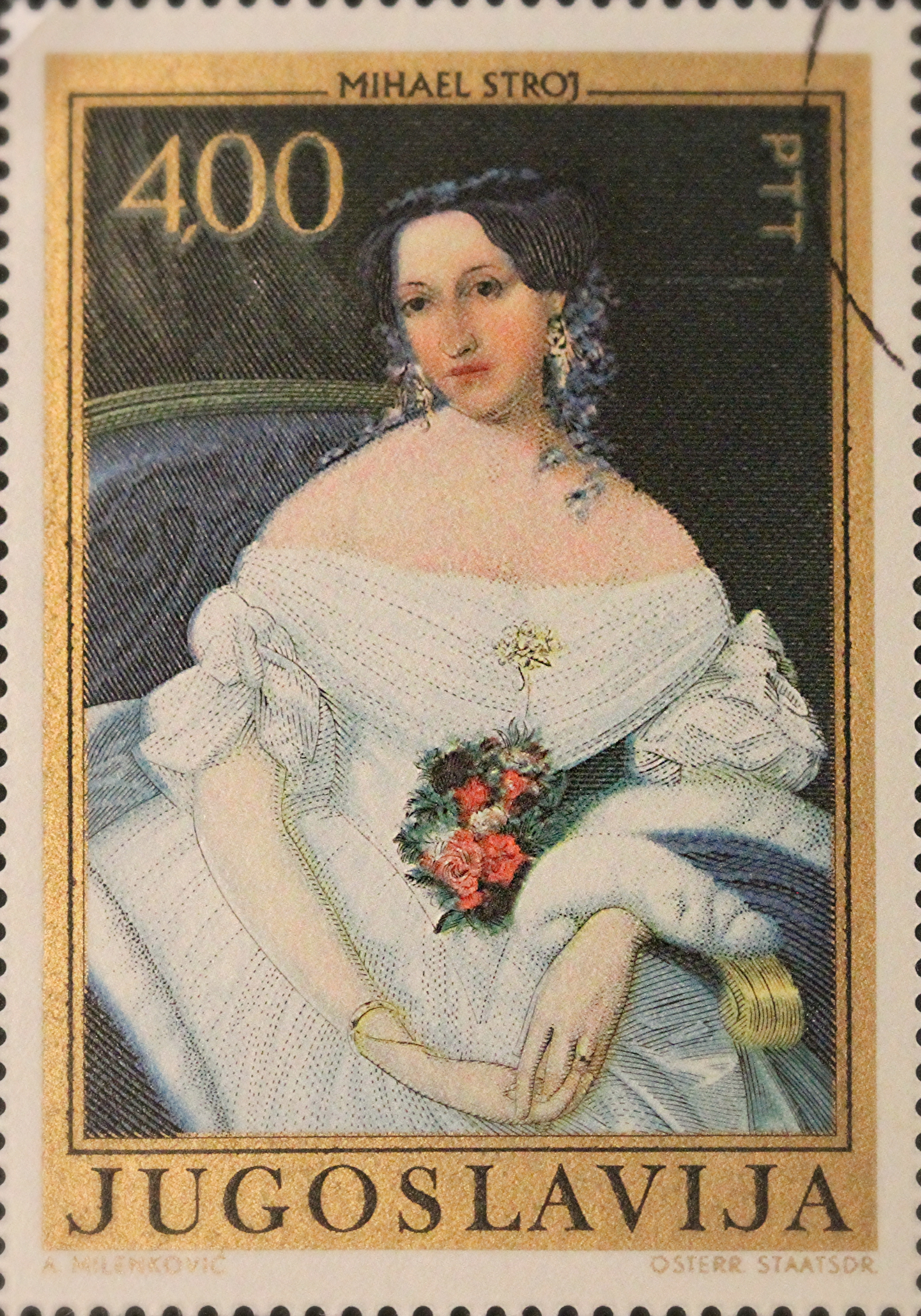
A Yugoslav stamp with Michael Stroy's work

Michael Stroy was born the fifth of eight children to Anton Stroy and his wife Maria, née Kokail. He spent his childhood in Ljubno in Upper Carniola. In 1812, his mother died of exhaustion. Shortly thereafter, his father remarried, sold his property in Ljubno and moved to Ljubljana with his family. Michael Stroy attended the Glavna vzorna šola, where he completed the fourth class in 1817 with very good grades. He then joined the so-called artists' class, which he concluded in 1820 with distinction. He continued his schooling in Vienna, where he enrolled in the Academy of Fine Arts in 1821. The first of his works known to have survived, a sketch of a head and a self-portrait, date from this period. It is known that Stroy was still a student at the Academy of Fine Arts in 1825, but it is not known whether he concluded his studies there.

In 1830, Stroy spent time in Zagreb, where he offered his services to the nobility and bourgeoisie as a portraitist. Because of the numerous commissions that he received, he remained in Zagreb. He lived in Croatia (with intermittent stays in Slovenia) until 1842. In this period, he painted not only a large number of portraits, but also works with religious content, including altar pictures for churches in Vugrovec and Nova Rača.

In Croatia, Stroy was exposed to the ideas of Illyrism and associated with members of the Illyrian movement, including Stanko Vraz, Đuro Jelačić, the Ožegović family and others.

In 1841, Stroy married Margareta Berghaus, which whom he had five daughters. The following year, he returned to Ljubljana, where he continued to paint portraits of important members of the local bourgeoisie, although he also received further commissions from Croatia. He died in his house in Ljubljana after suffering multiple heart attacks.

Stroy used his baptismal name, Michael Stroy, throughout his life, and it is also the name entered in his death record. The Slovenized spelling Mihael Stroj first appeared about a decade after the artist's death.

== Work ==
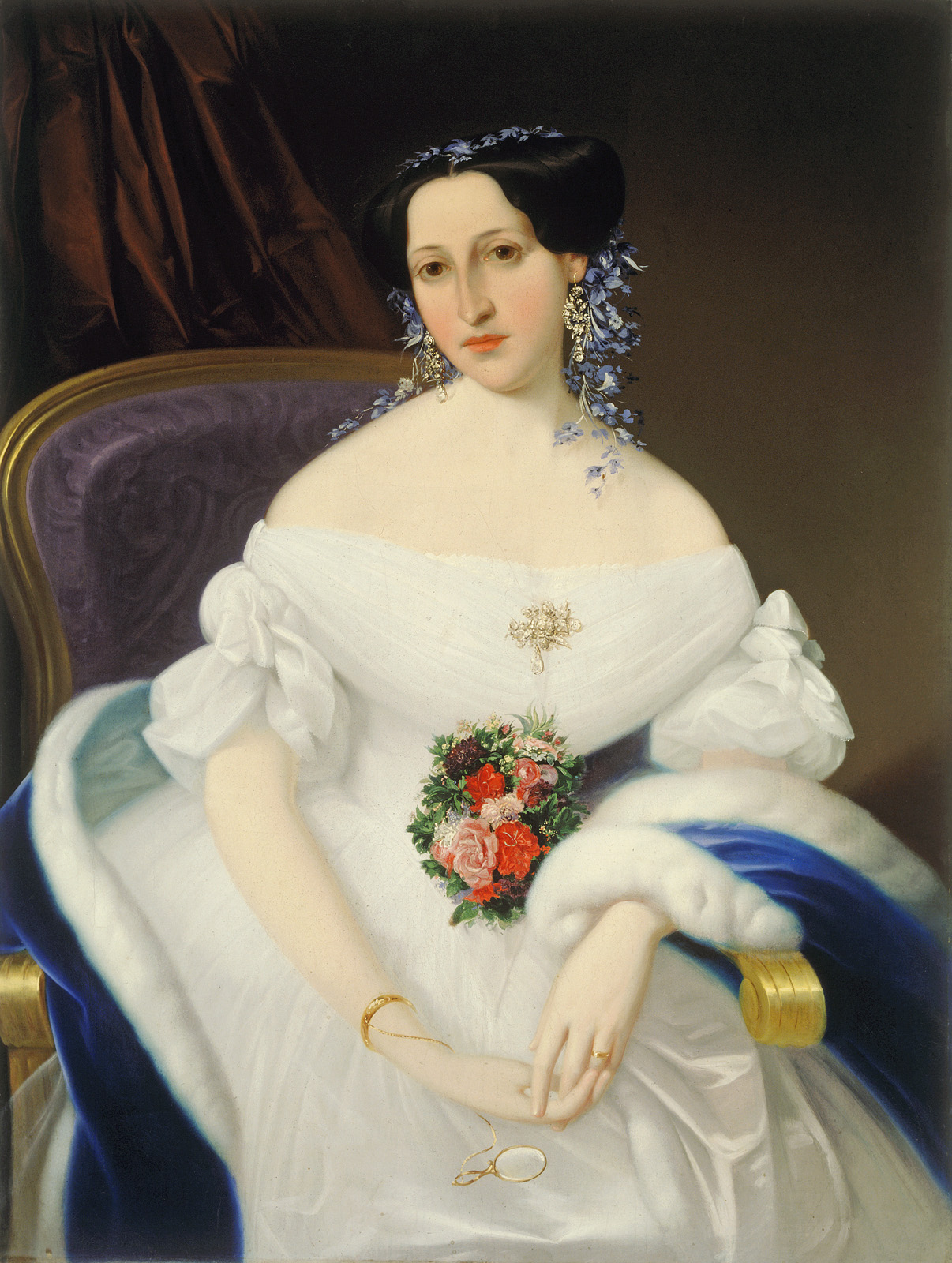
Portrait of Luiza Pesjak

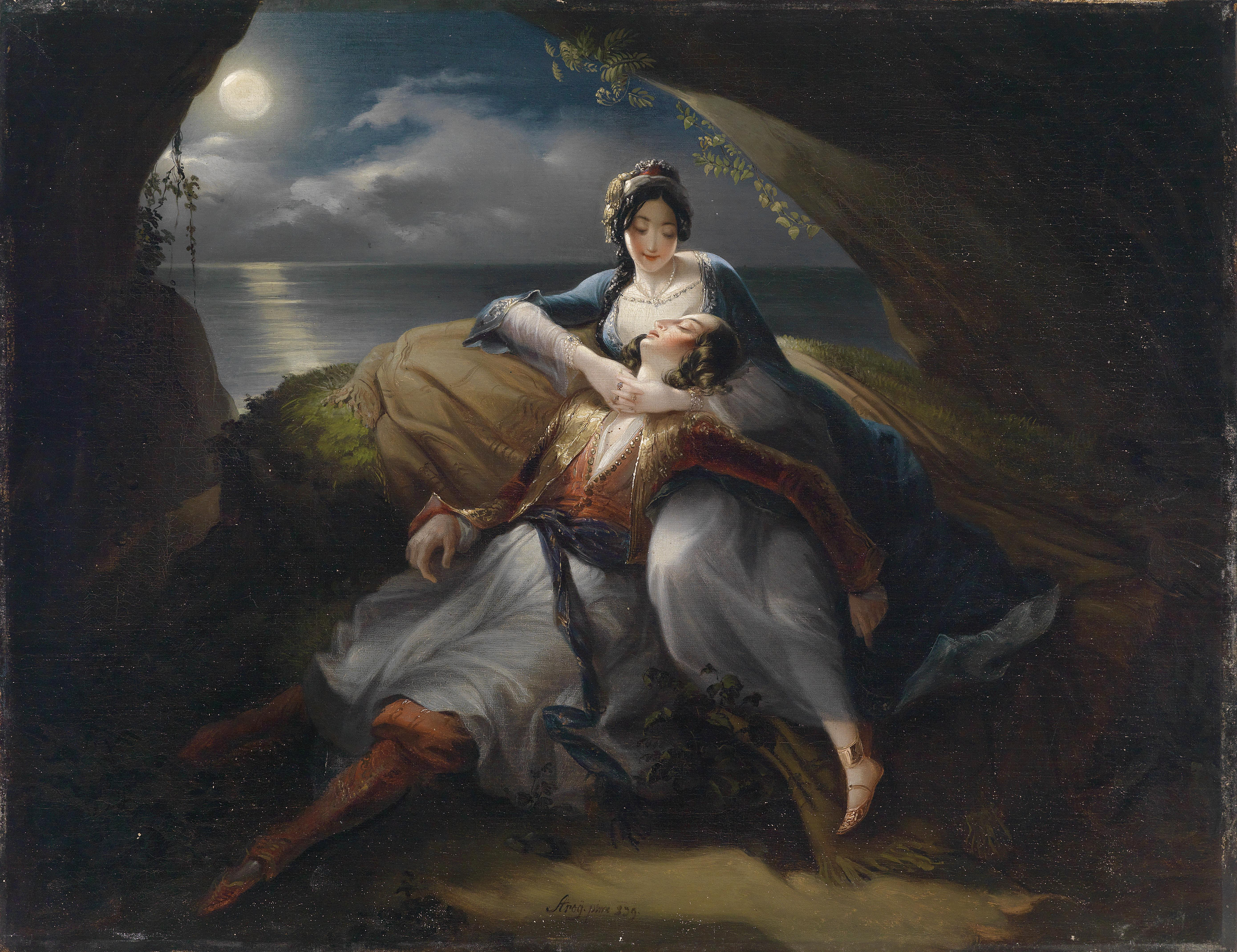
Angelica and Medoro (1833), a scene from the epic Orlando Furioso

Michael Stroy was one of the most prominent Slovenian painters of the 19th century. His art reflects the Classicism and the Romanticism of his day, but the influence of the Biedermeier style is also visible. Most of his works are oil paintings, which he signed Stroy.

Portraits of rich members of the bourgeoisie in Ljubljana and in Zagreb made up the majority of his work, although he also painted religious motives, genre works and historical themes. Some of his paintings are listed below.

=== Portraits ===
- J. Martinčič (1830)
- Đuro Jelačić (1832)
- Karlo Jelačić (1834)
- Stjepan Ožegović (1837)
- Julijana Gaj (1838)
- Mož z rdečo ovratnico (1840)
- Stanko Vraz (1841)
- Dr. Blaž Crobath (1842)
- Mihael Ambrož (1850)
- Luiza Pesjakova (around 1855)
- Škof Anton Alojzij Wolf (1857)
- Ljubljanska meščanka (1858)
- Škof Mirko Karlo Raffay (around 1830)
- Škof Juraj Haulik (1840)

=== Genre and historical works ===
- Izpad iz trdnjave Siget (1820s)
- V kovačnici (1838)
- Historični prizor (?)
- Vilinski ples (?)
- Orientalka (?)

=== Religious works ===
- Božja skrb (1842)
- Marija pomagaj (?)
- Marija z Jezusom na prestolu (1857)
- Sv. Florijan (around 1855)
- Sv. Anton Puščavnik (1863)

== Paintings ==
Michael Stroy's works

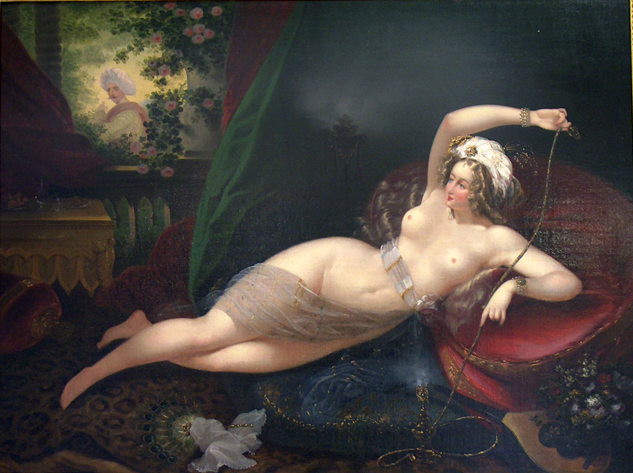
Azija

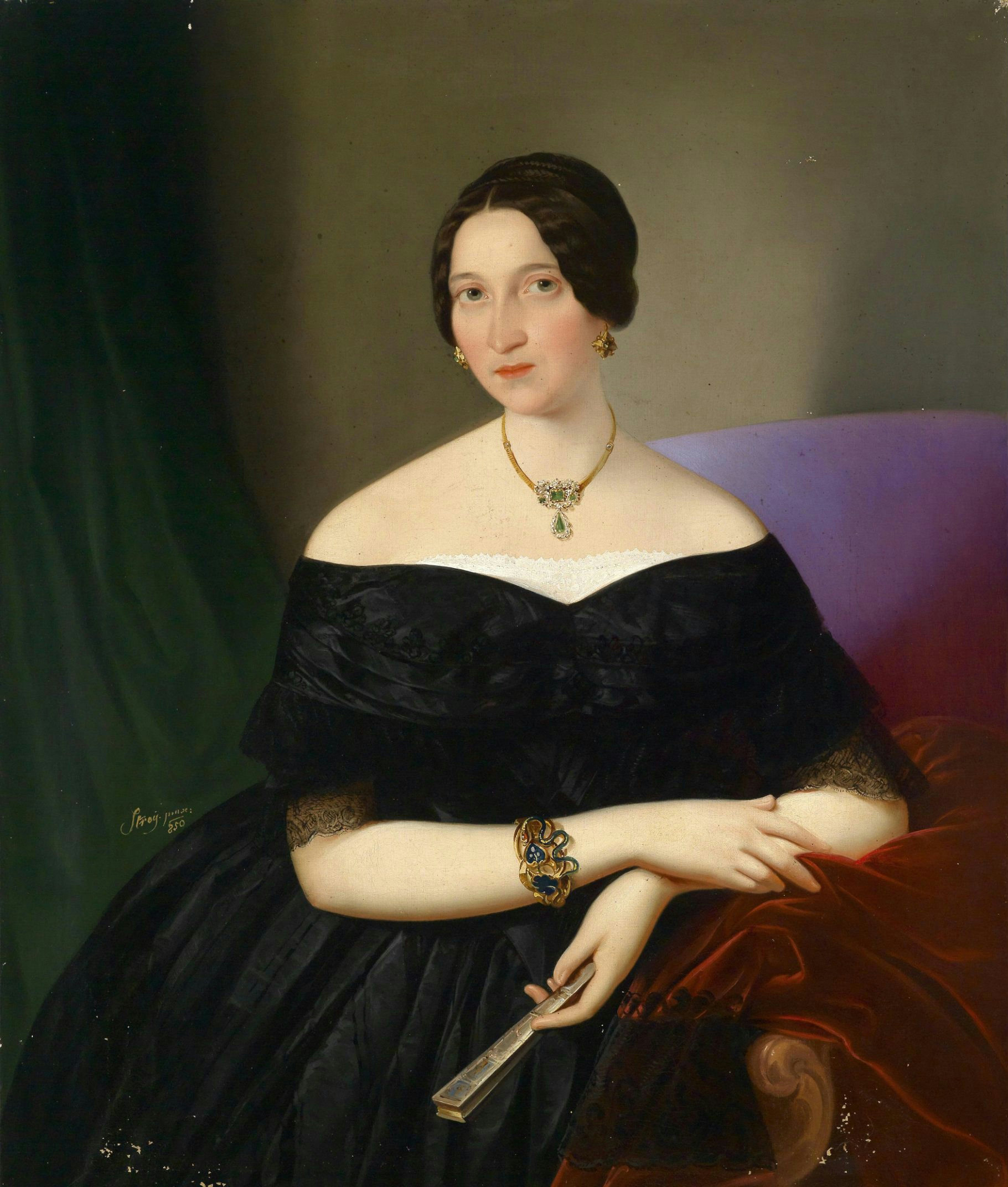
Portrait of Luiza Pesjak II

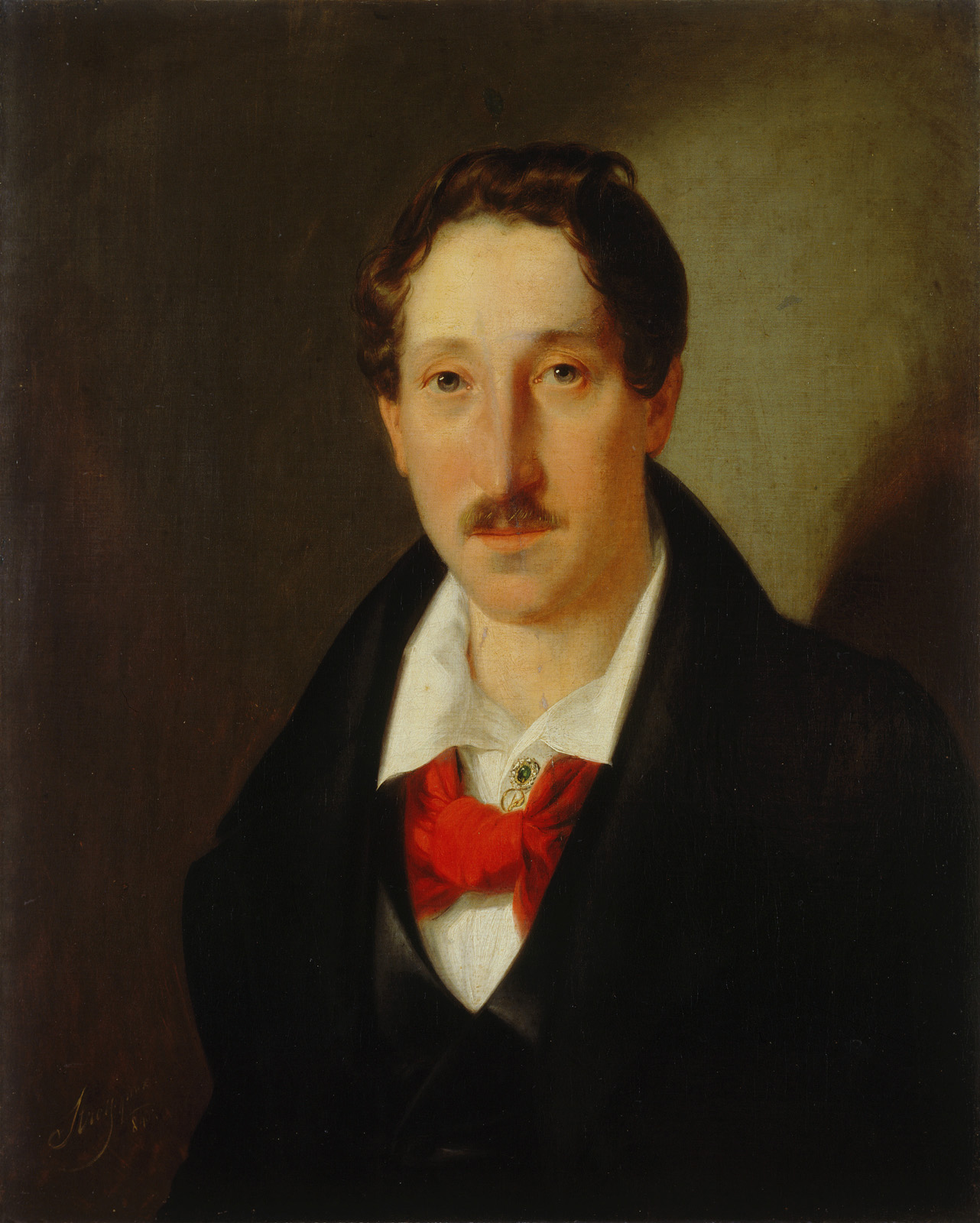
Portrait of a man

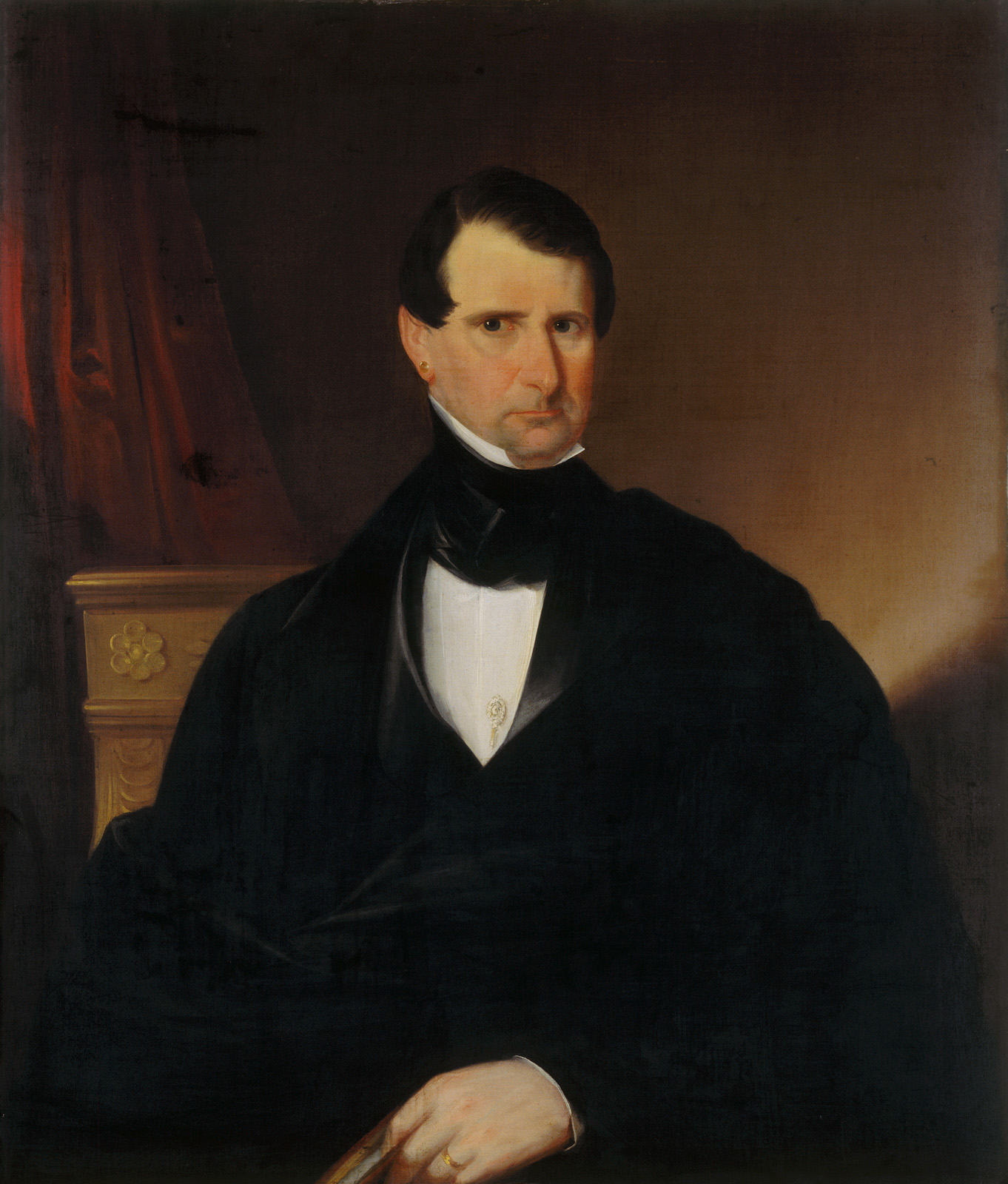
Portrait of Blaž Crobath, c. 1842

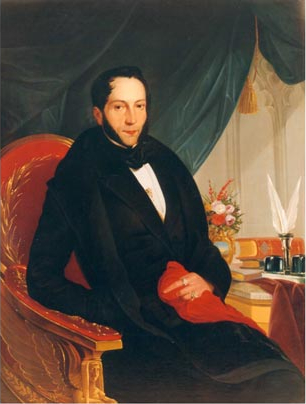
Kristofor Stanković

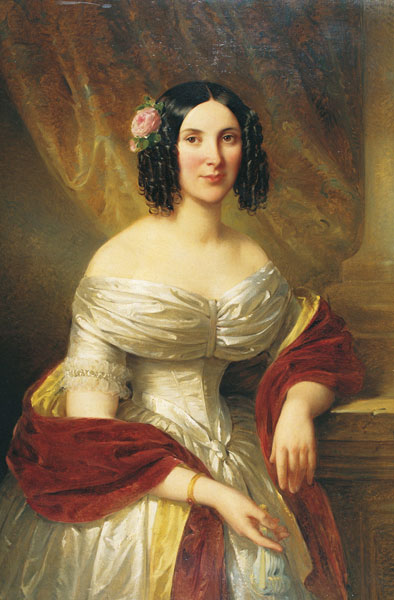
Therese Proch

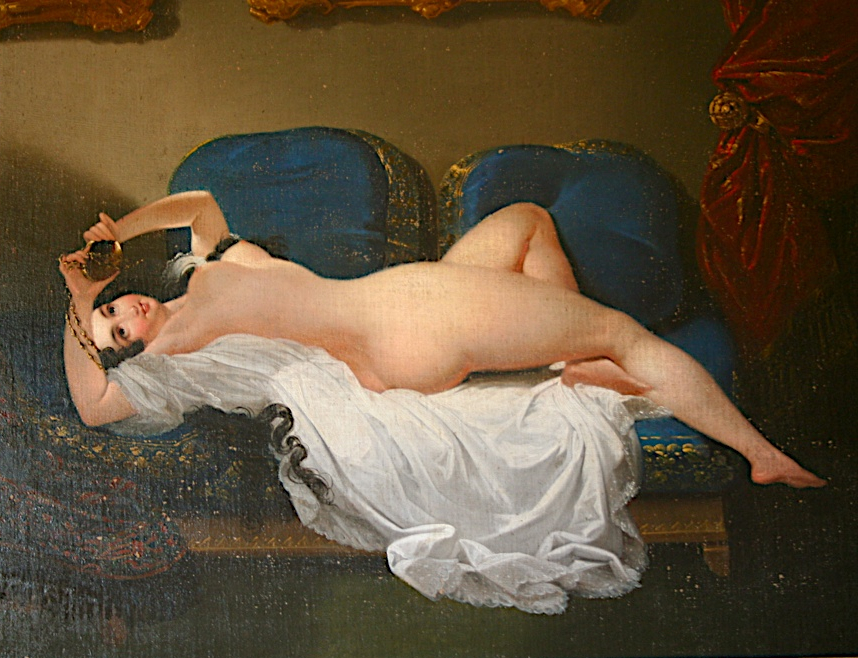
Europa
