= Janez Jalen =

Slovene writer and priest

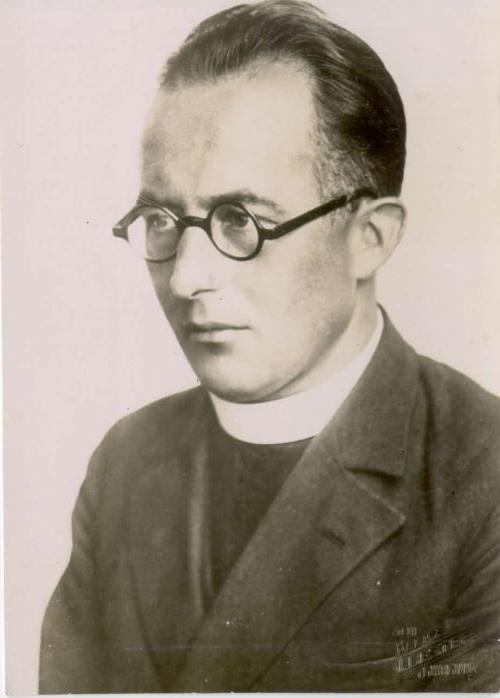
Jalen Janez

Janez Jalen (26 May 1891 – 12 April 1966) was a Slovene writer and priest.

== Life ==
Janez Jalen was born into a rural family in the Upper Carniolan village of Rodine. His father awakened in him a great interest in nature early on in his life. After finishing secondary school in Kranj he studied theology in Ljubljana. His first pastoral appointment was to Srednja Vas v Bohinju in the Upper Carniola region of Slovenia. The beauty of the surrounding area, which he came to love and admire, was what encouraged him to begin writing. During the First World War he was mobilised into the Austrian Army and served as a curate in the Lebring Army Camp near Graz. After the war he served as a priest in a number of places around Slovenia: Črnomelj, Stara Loka, Trnovo, Notranje Gorice and Ljubljana, where retired in 1933. After the Second World War he re-entered service and was priest in Grahovo and finally Ljubno where he died. He is buried in Rodine.

== Work ==
In his early period Jalen dedicated most of his time to writing plays depicting rural life at the time of the First World War. Among these are Dom (Home, 1923), Srenja (The Common, 1924), and Bratje (Brothers, 1931). Later he began writing prose, in which he also deals with rural life, albeit in a slightly idyllic way. His first novel, Ovčar Marko (Shepherd Marko), was originally published in installments in the magazine Mladika in 1928, the book only being published a year later. In 1958, it was re-published as the first part of Vozarji, an intended quartet about rural life. Jalen died before publishing any further volumes. His best-known work is a tale of a prehistoric people living in the marsh south of Ljubljana, titled Bobri (Beavers) which was published in three parts (Sam, Rod, Vrh; 1942–43). At his death a number of works remained unfinished and unpublished.

Other works

- Nevesta (The Bride, play, 1936)
- Grobovi (Graves, play, 1936)
- Lesena peč (The Wooden Stove, play, 1937)
- Cilka Cvetko (novel, 1939)
- Previsi (Cliffs, collection of tales and short stories, 1940)
- Trop brez zvoncev (The Bell-Less Herd, novel, 1941)
- Bobri (Beavers, novel, published in three parts 1941-1943)
- Ograd (The Fence, novel, 1961)
- Razpotja (Crossroads, novel, not published until 2003)
