= Ivan Pregelj =

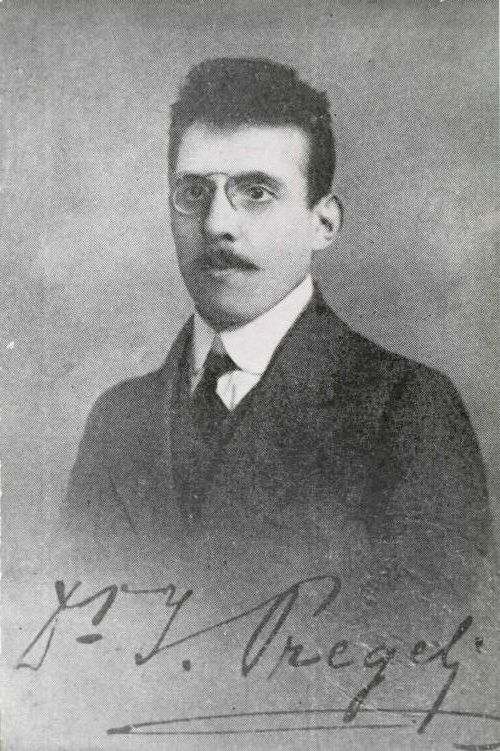
Ivan Pregelj

Ivan Pregelj (27 October 1883 – 30 January 1960) was a Slovene writer, playwright, poet, and critic.

== Life ==
Pregelj was born to a tailor's family in Most na Soči (at that time called Sveta Lucija) and baptized Joannes Pregelj, the son of Hermagoras Pregelj and Maria Pregelj (née Kovačič). His mother died in 1891, when Pregelj was seven years old, and his father died in 1892, when Pregelj was eight. He attended school with the help of the parish priest. After graduating from high school, he started studying theology but soon abandoned this. He then went to Vienna, where he entered the programs in Slavic studies and German studies. He wrote his dissertation on the Capuchin sermon-writer Mihael Krammer (1667–1728). Pregelj taught as a secondary school instructor in Gorizia, Pazin, Idrija, Kranj, and Ljubljana. He intentionally stopped writing around age fifty. Pregelj died in Ljubljana on 30 January 1960.

== Works ==
Pregelj primarily wrote poems, stories, and plays. He created an extensive body of literary criticism in the form of essays and translations of various works. His best-known works are the novel Tolminci (The People from Tolmin) and Matkova Tina (Tina from the Matko Farm), both set during the Tolmin peasant revolt of 1713. Lesser-known works include his libretto for the opera Tajda by Hugolin Sattner (1851–1934). He also wrote a biographical novel about Simon Jenko titled Simon iz Praš (Simon from Praše). Other works by Pregelj include his poetry collection Romantika (Romance, 1910) and the folk tale Mlada Breda (Young Breda, 1913) about a wicked stepmother named Katra and a good bride named Anica, in which he realistically portrays a struggle over a farm in the Tolmin area.

The novel Tlačani (Serfs, published in Dom in svet, 1915–1916) is Pregel's most extensive work, published in book form under the title Tolminci (The People from Tolmin, 1927). He retitled his serialized story Zadnji upornik (The Last Rebel, Dom in svet, 1918–1919) as Štefan Golja in njegovi (Štefan Golja and Friends, 1928).

In many of his other stories and novels, Pregelj dealt with issues of ethnicity, faith, and world view, which he always resolved from a Catholic perspective. His last major work was the novella Thabiti Kumi (1933).

An English-language version of his short story 'Vicar Mathias's Last Guest' was published in 1934.

From 1918 to 1930, Pregelj was very popular among Catholic intellectuals because he addressed ethical issues, in particular, the divide between spiritual and everyday life.

== Sources ==
- Janež, Stanko. 1978. Pregled Slovenske književnosti. Maribor: Obzorja.
