= Luiza Pesjak =

Slovene writer (1828–1898)

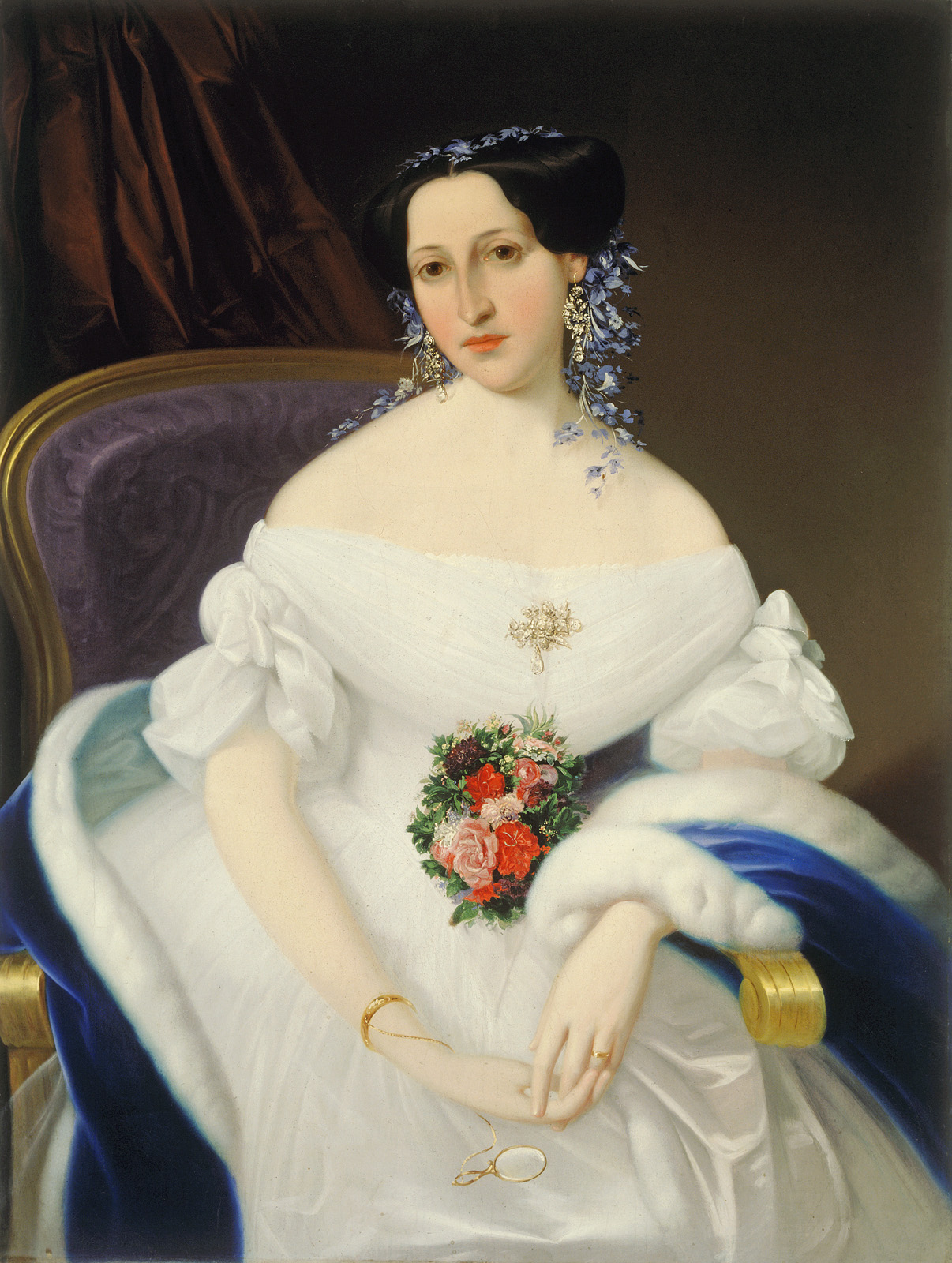
- Born: 12 June 1828; Ljubljana
- Died: 31 March 1898 (aged 69); Ljubljana

Luiza Pesjak or Lujiza Pesjakova (12 June 1828 – 31 March 1898) was a Slovene writer, poet and translator. She was the first woman to author a novel in Slovene.

== Early life and education ==
Pesjak was born in Ljubljana on 12 June 1828 and baptized the following day as Aloysia Josepha Willhelmina Crobath, the daughter of the lawyer Blasius Crobath (1797–1848) and Josepha née Brugnak (1804–1855). She was educated in the Fröhlich Institute and by local teachers, including France Prešeren. Pesjak was acquainted with Stritar, Gregorčič and Levstik with whom she exchanged correspondence. She spent a considerable time invested in reading, going to the theater and opera as well as traveling and being social.

== Novelist ==
Pesjak was one of Slovenia's early novelists, producing the story Beatin dnevnik (Beata's Diary) in 1887 as well as writing poetry, plays and the opera libretto for Gorenjski slavček. Pesjak included a strong patriotic message into her works. She was published in both Slovenia and Germany. Notably her first works were in German as at that time she did not speak Slovene.

== Personal life ==
Pesjak was married on 3 October 1848 to the entrepreneur Simon Pesjak. They had five daughters, Helena, Louise, Mary, Ida, and Emma. Though the family spoke German and French, the girls got a local teacher after the introduction of a constitution granting civil and political liberties in the Austrian Empire in 1860 and it was after this that Pesjak learned Slovene and began to write in the language. She began to promote the learning of the local language and to translate poems into it. She translated works in German, English, Italian, Czech and French. She was published in a number of journals. It took ten years for Pesjak to get her diary novel published with her conditions but eventually she succeeded in 1887. In later life her financial stability decreased and Pesjak lived in restricted means almost forgotten. In 1897 she had a stroke while in Podbrezje and died in March 1898.

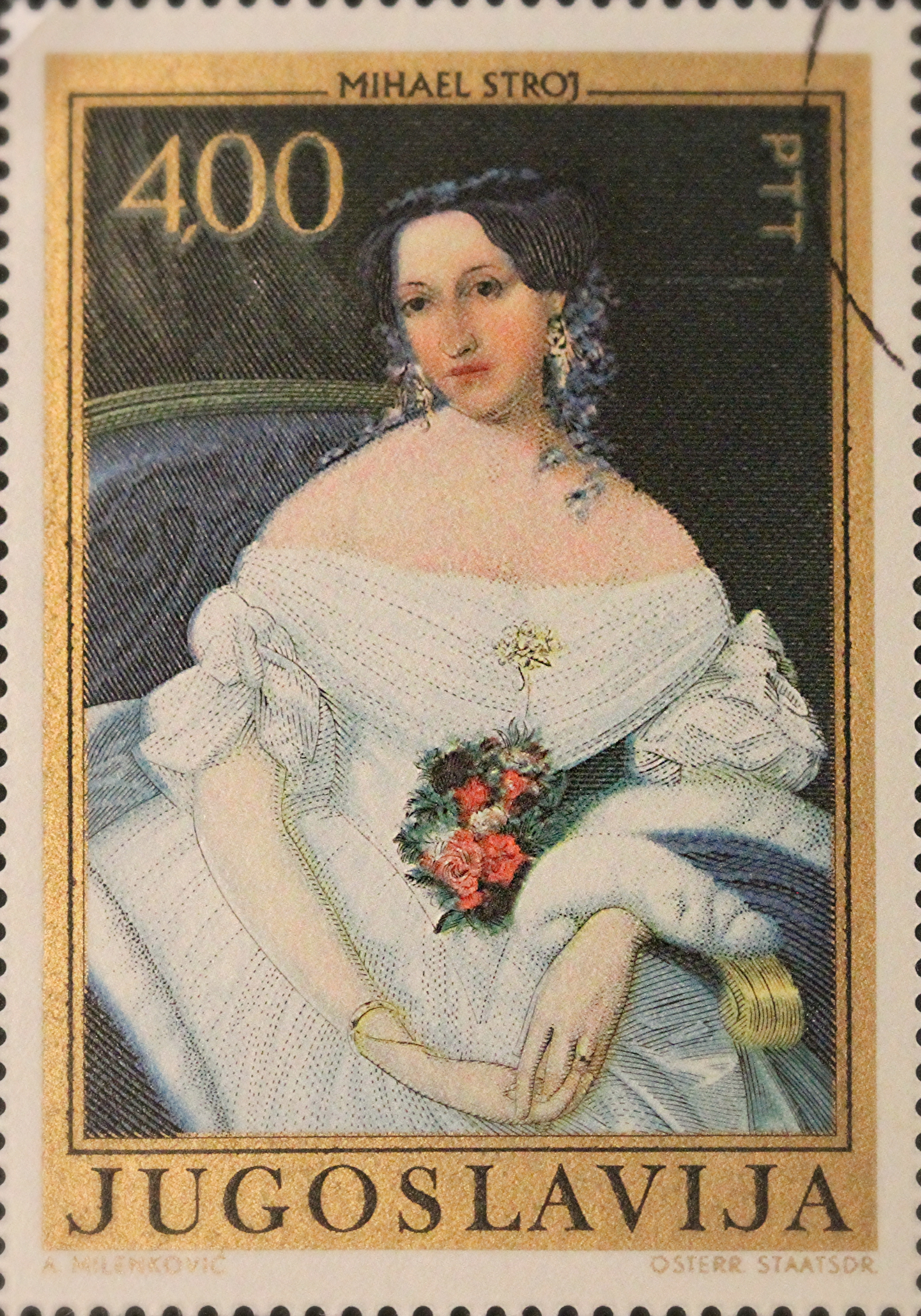
Yugoslav stamp

A street in Ljubljana was named for her, Luize Pesjakove ulica (Luiza Pesjak Street), and she was featured on a Yugoslav stamp. Her portrait is in the National Gallery of Slovenia, where it is one of the most popular pictures.

== Publications ==
Poems

- "Kar ljubim" (What I Love, 1864)
- "Vijolice" (Violets, 1885)

Prose

- "Očetova ljubezen" (A Father's Love, 1864)
- "Dragotin" (1864)
- "Rahela" (Rachel, 1870)
- Beatin dnevnik (Beata's Diary, 1887)

Plays

- Svitoslav Zajcek (1865)
- Slovenija Vodniku (Slovenia Guide, 1866)
- Na Koprivniku (In Koprivnik, 1872)

Opera libretto

- Gorenjski slavček (The Nightingale of Upper Carniola, 1872)

Autobiography

- Iz mojega detinstva (From My Childhood, 1886)
