= Beletrina Academic Press =

Slovenian publishing house

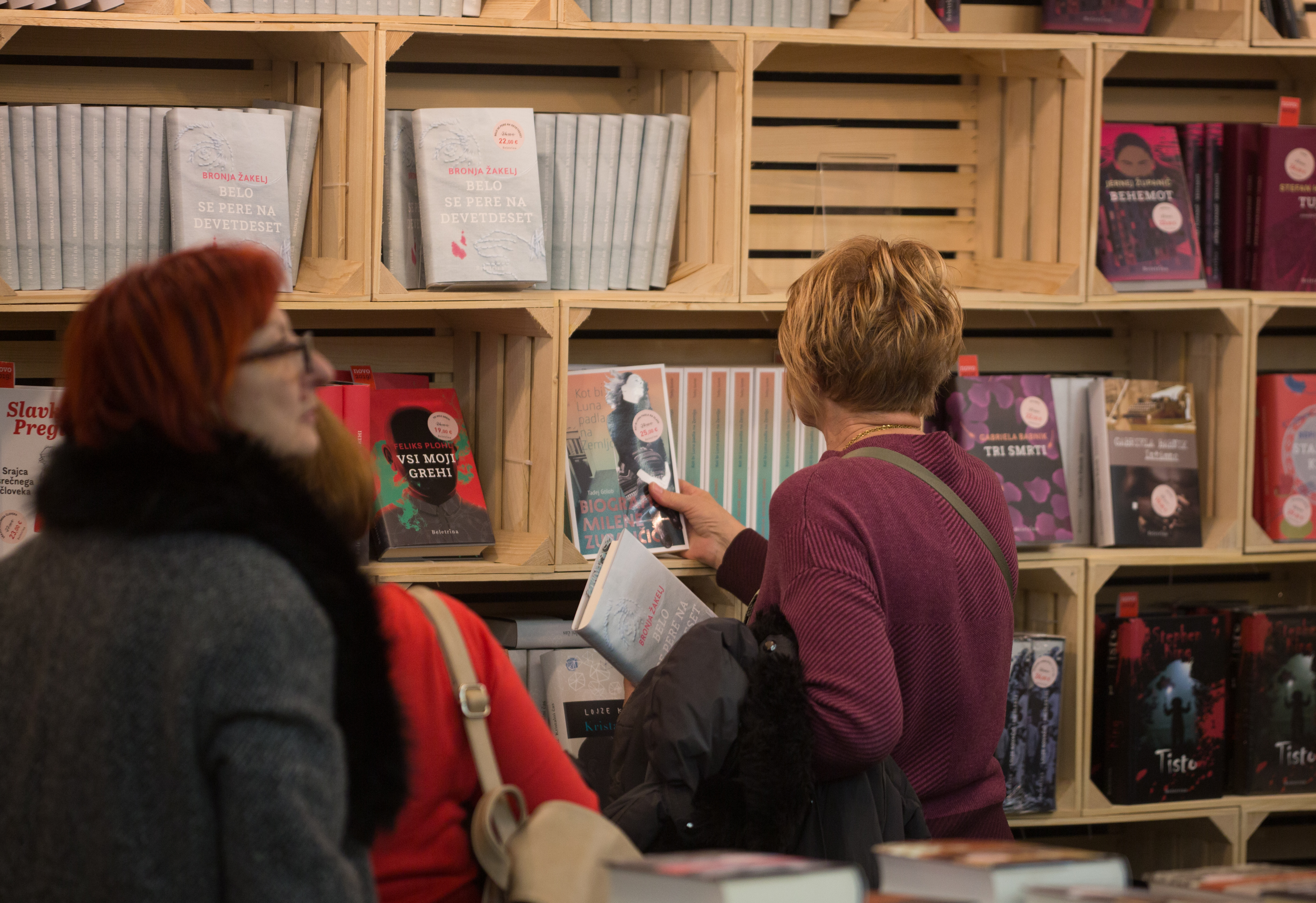
Stall of Beletrina Press at the 2019 Slovenian Book Fair.

Beletrina Academic Press is a Slovenian publishing house, originally founded in 1996 by students of the University of Ljubljana as the Študentska Založba (Student Publishing House). Co-founders include notable Slovene authors such as Aleš Šteger and Mitja Cander. It has operated the Beletrina Bookshop, which opened in Ljubljana in 2010, since 2014. In addition to physical books, it also publishes the online magazines AirBeletrina and Versopolis, and hosts two literary festivals, Days of Poetry and Wine Festival and Fabula Festival, since 2004. Through the AirBeletrina literary journal, it hosts a short-story contest; the publishing house also organizes creative writing courses. In 2013, Beletrina launched Biblos.si, the first Slovene eLibrary and eBookshop. Beletrina also issues recordings of authors reading from their own work. As a non-profit publisher, it receives funding from the Slovenian government with an aim to "foster a literary atmosphere throughout Slovenia". Beletrina also receives subsidies from the European Union, the Slovene Public Agency for Books (JAK), and different ministries of culture in Slovenia.

== History ==
In 1981 the Socialist Youth League of Slovenia (UK ZSMS) branch at the University of Ljubljana founded the publishing house Krt, an acronym for Knjižnica Revolucionarne Teorije (Library of Revolutionary Theory), meaning mole in English. Many of the early writers and editors of Krt's works were both faculty and students of the university. Krt began publishing anarchist texts with an intent to subvert the orthodoxy of government and inspire a sense of influence among students and youth in Ljubljana. Topics of publication included the Prague Spring of 1968, a history of the Slovene youth movement, the meaning of punk in Slovenia, and other politically charged topics that would have likely not been printed otherwise. Other publications included anthologies of Western political and social theorists translated into Slovene.

The parent organization of Beletrina, Študentska Organizacija Univerze (Ljubljana Student Organisation), is the successor of the UK ZSMS and undertakes a wide variety of publishing activities and initiatives, including textbooks, criticism, and literature. Since its spin-off into a private publishing institute, Beletrina has focused on publishing prose by outstanding young and upcoming Slovene authors. The reason for the separation of Beletrina from ŠOU was given as finances; namely that ŠOU was unable to provide the financial support necessary for the normal operations of the publishing house to continue. However the privatization of the publishing house sparked concerns about allocation of public funds for the support of culture and art to a private institution After spinning off into Beletrina, the founding rights were transferred from ŠOU Ljubljana to nine individuals, divided between Slovene authors and founders from the former Študentska Založba: the authors Andrej Brvar, Milan Dekleva, Niko Grafenauer, Milan Jesih and Veno Taufer, and the founders Aleš Šteger, Mitja Čander, Tomaž Gerdina and Marko Hercog. The inclusion of the five well-known Slovene authors was intended to act as a guarantee of maintaining high standards for publication and an assurance to act in the public interest.

== Publications ==
The publication focus of Beletrina has evolved over time, from chapbook translations excerpted from longer works to book-length translations in full. Publishing approximately 50 titles per year, Beletrina focuses on original works by Slovene authors as well as international authors in translation. When choosing works to be translated, the focus is placed on the "most important works of world literature that are still missing in Slovene translation". Many of the works and authors translated come from the long- and short-lists of major literary awards such as the Nobel Prize in Literature, the Booker Prize, and the European Union Prize for Literature. Beletrina has also partnered with publishers outside of Slovenia to publish anthologies of Slovene writers for English-speaking readers.

Notable Slovene authors published by Beletrina include: Drago Jančar, Gabriela Babnik, Dino Bauk, Jurij Hudolin, Jernej Županič, Vitomil Zupan, Bronja Žakelj, Vlado Žabot, Goran Vojnović, Alojz Ihan, Samira Kentrić, Lojze Kovačič, Jani Virk, Suzana Tratnik, Zmago Šmitek, Ana Schnabl, Dušan Šarotar, Eva Mahkovic, Katja Perat, Jela Krečič, Mojca Kumerdej, and Feri Lainšček. Foreign authors published by Beletrina include W. G. Sebald, Jonathan Franzen, Marguerite Yourcenar, Michel Houellebecq, George Orwell, Michel Foucault, Margaret Atwood, and Hannah Arendt, among others.
