= Andrej Blatnik =

Slovene writer

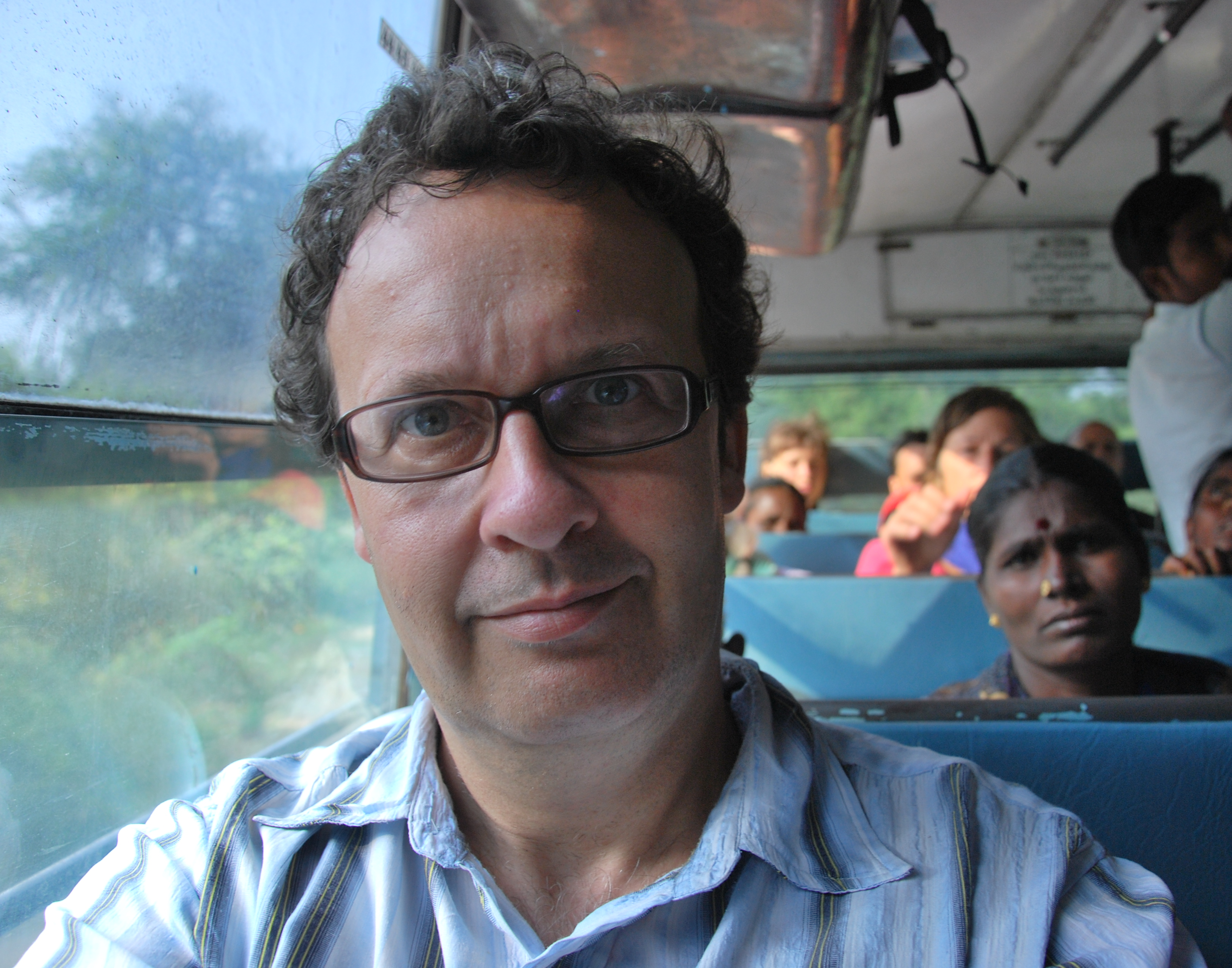
- Born: 22 May 1963 (age 63); Ljubljana, Slovenia
- Occupations: Novelist, short story writer, editor, professor
- Writing career
- Period: Late 20th – early 21st century
- Genres: Literary fiction, non-fiction
- Notable works: Skinswaps, Law of Desire, You Do Understand, Change Me

Andrej Blatnik (born 22 May 1963) is a Slovene writer, editor, and professor.

== Biography ==
Blatnik was born in Ljubljana in 1963. He received a master's in American literature at the University of Ljubljana's Faculty of Arts, and a PhD (on the influence of popular culture on American postmodernist novels) at the University of Ljubljana's Faculty of Social Sciences in communication studies in 2004.

He worked as a freelance writer before becoming the fiction editor for the Slovenian publisher Cankarjeva založba. He has been an associate professor at the University of Ljubljana's Faculty of Arts since 2009, and was the president of the jury for the Vilenica Central European Literary Prize between 2007 and 2015.

Blatnik travels a lot, especially in India and Southeast Asia, which occasionally reflects in his writing.

== Awards ==
In 1984 he won the Zlata Ptica award for his first book of short stories, Šopki za Adama venijo, in 1991 the Župančič Award of the City of Ljubljana for his book of short stories Menjave kož, and in 2002 the highest Slovene cultural award, the Prešeren Foundation Award, for his book of short stories Zakon želje. His novel Spremeni me was shortlisted for best novel of the year (the Kresnik Award) in 2009, and his book of essays and literary studies Neonski pečati for the best book of essays (the Rožanc Award) in 2006. In 2021 he was shortlisted for the annual Cankar Award. In 2024, his book of essays Knjige na potiwas shortlisted for the best book of essays award, the Rožanc award. He won the Neda Pagon award for his lifetime work as an editor and the Schwentner award for excellence in publishing.

== Publications ==
Blatnik's first book, Šopki za Adama venijo, is regarded in Slovenia as the first independent book of the generation of the 1980s. His popular topic is "the relations between the sexes, which he treats with sophistication, good humour, and irony. Chance encounters, fleeting relationships, resigned farewells, misunderstandings, and reconciliations are the stuff of many of his short stories. In view of his travels, especially in the United States, the human landscape is frequently cosmopolitan. His style is direct and laconic, in both prose narration and dialogue." His short stories have been translated into about 30 languages and he has published around 40 books in other countries, including four in English—Skinswaps (Northwestern University Press, 1988), You Do Understand (Dalkey Archive Press, 2010), Law of Desire (Dalkey Archive Press, 2014) and Change Me (Dalkey Archive Press, 2019)—eight in Macedonian, seven in Croatian, four in German, three in Serbian and Turkish, two in Spanish, Italian and Czech, and also books in Russian, French, Slovak, Odia, Malayalam, Tamil and Hungarian.

== Reviews ==
Skinswaps received favorable reviews in Publishers Weekly ("The recognizably Central European characters mix philosophy, eroticism and everyday grit, returning repeatedly to themes of music, death, betrayal and the fragility of the individual's hold on reality. Blatnik's craftsmanship and modern flair direct our attention repeatedly to what is small, strange and essential in the world around us."), The New York Times ("This debut collection ... shows that after the opening of the former Eastern bloc, modern alienation travels faster than social and political change."), Kirkus Review ("Superlative short fiction from an exciting new writer."), and elsewhere.

You Do Understand received an equally positive response in Publishers Weekly ("Each of these short bursts (most are barely a page long) bubbles with a droll, dry humor handily captured by Soban's dead-on, deadpan translation."), Kirkus Review ("Blatnik has a knack for wringing insight and meaning out of such concision, and he occasionally places stories with similar themes next to each other to exploit their resonances."), and Library Journal ("Readers who actively participate in Blatnik's imaginative process will be richly rewarded.").

Publishers Weekly noted that in Law of Desire, "some stories delve into darkly profound territory, like 'A Thin Red Line,' in which a former terrorist chooses a humanitarian suicide, sacrificing himself for a tribe's rain ritual" and "some pieces are wonderfully humorous." Kirkus gave Change me a starred review: "With some echoes of Kafka and Vonnegut, this novel looks for the soul of the 21st century and finds an abyss."

== Books ==
- Šopki za Adama venijo (Bouquets for Adam Fade), short stories, (1983)
- Plamenice in solze (Torches and Tears), novel, (1987)
- Biografije brezimenih (Biographies of the Nameless), short stories, (1989)
- Menjave kož (Skinswaps) short stories, (1990)
- Labirinti iz papirja (Paper Labyrinths), essays, (1994)
- Gledanje čez ramo (Looking over the Shoulder), essays, (1996)
- Tao ljubezni (Tao of Love), novel, (1996)
- Zakon želje (Law of Desire), short stories, (2000)
- Neonski pečati (Neon Seals), essays & literary studies, (2005)
- Spremeni me (Change Me), novel, (2008)
- Saj razumeš? (You Do Understand), short stories, (2009)
- Pisanje kratke zgodbe (Writing a Short Story), reference book, (2010)
- Ugrizi (Bites), short stories, (2018)
- Izdati in obstati (To Publish and not to Perish), publishing studies, (2018)
- Nezbrano delo (Uncollected work), cultural commentaries, (2020)
- Luknje (Holes), novel, (2020)
- Trg osvoboditve (Liberation Square), novel, (2021)
- Knjige na poti (Books on the Way), essays, (2023)
- Besedi na sledi (Tracking the Word), travelogue, (2025)

- Nouvelles de Slovénie (short stories from Slovenia - collective book), Paris, Éditions Magellan & Cie, (2025)
