= Ana Schnabl =

Slovenian author and writer (born 1985)

Ana Schnabl (born 1985 in Ljubljana) is a Slovenian author and journalist.

== Life and work ==
Schnabl studied comparative literature and philosophy at the University of Ljubljana. Since 2016 she has been a doctoral student in philosophy and is working on a thesis on feminist autobiographical writings. In addition to her work as a writer, she is an editor of the European web platform Versopolis and a freelance journalist and literary critic. She writes for the London newspaper The Guardian.

== Works ==
- Razvezani (Disentangled) — short stories: Beletrina, Ljubljana, 2017, ISBN 978-961-284-276-5
- Mojstrovina (Masterpiece) — novel: Beletrina, Ljubljana, 2020, ISBN 978-961-284-620-6;
  translated into English by David Limon as "The Masterpiece", Istros Books, London, 2021, ISBN 978-1-912545-896
- Plima (Tide) — novel: Beletrina, Ljubljana, 2022, ISBN 978-961-284-851-4
- September — novel: Beletrina, Ljubljana, 2024, ISBN 978-961-298-194-5

== Awards ==
- 2014: AirBeletrina Prize for the best short story
- 2017: Slovenian Book Fair award for best literary debut
- 2019: Edo Budiša Prize for Serbian translation of Razvezani
- 2022: Artist-in-residence at the MuseumsQuartier, Vienna
- 2025: Kresnik Award for September
