= Tone Perčič =

Slovenian writer and translator (born 1954)

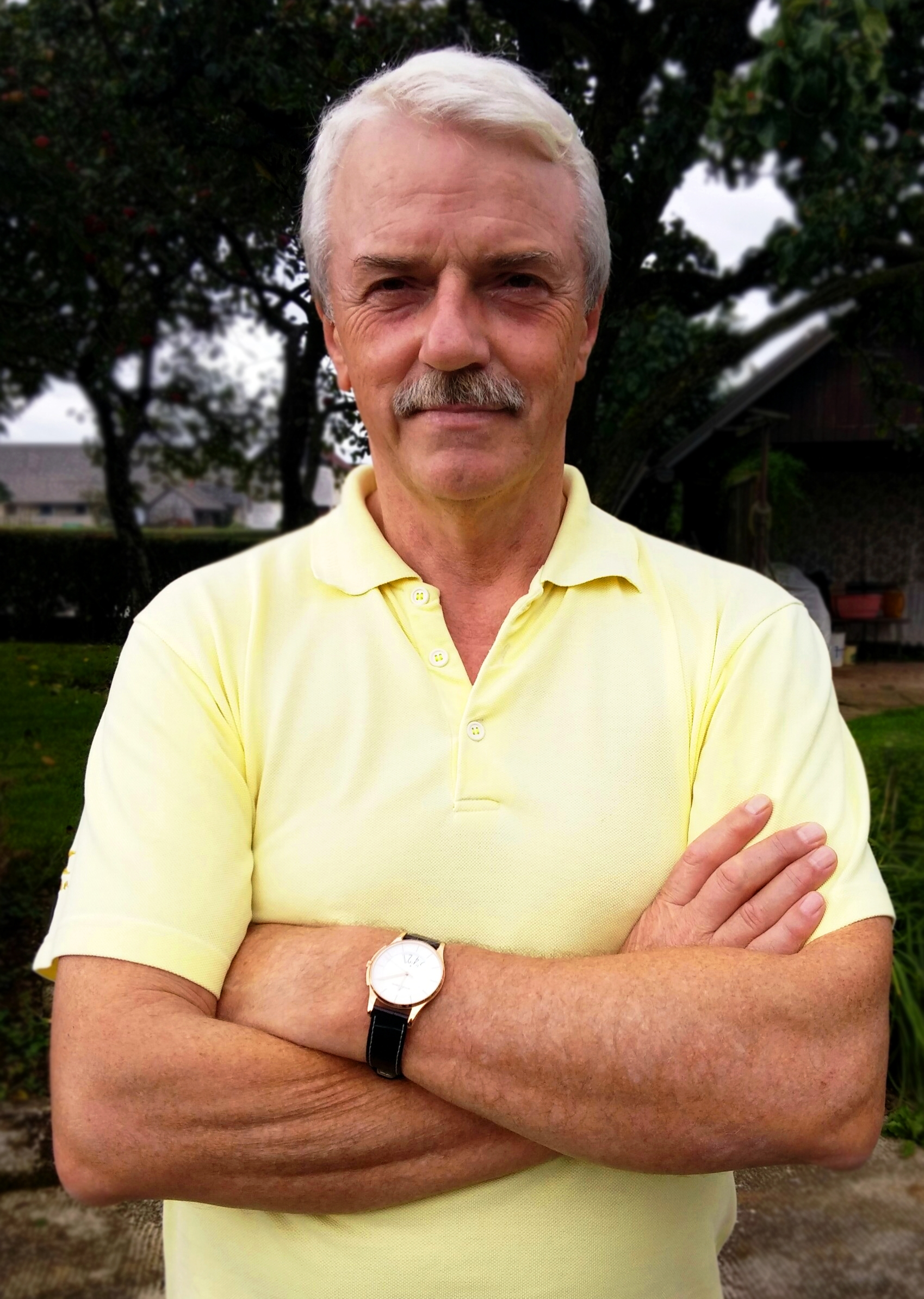
- Slovenian writer and translator
- Born: 26 December 1954 (age 71); Ljubljana, Socialist Federal Republic of Yugoslavia (now Slovenia)
- Occupations: Writer, translator
- Writing career
- Notable works: Izganjalec hudiča, Harmagedon
- Notable awards: Kresnik Award; 1995 Izganjalec hudiča

Tone Perčič (born 26 December 1954) is a Slovenian writer and translator.

Perčič was born in Ljubljana in 1954. He studied French and Italian at the University of Ljubljana and worked as a lecturer in Slovene at universities in Leipzig, Berlin, Nottingham and Paris.

He won the Kresnik Award for his novel Izganjalec hudiča in 1995.

== Published works ==
- Pot v nestalnost, short stories, (1981)
- Dante pri Slovencih, a study of Dante in context of Slovenia and Slovene culture (1989)
- Izganjalec hudiča, novel, (1994)
- Harmagedon, novel, (1997)
- In ti boš meni ponoči trkal na vrata, short stories, (1998)
- Prostozidarstvo, a study on Freemasonry, (2000)
