= Sebastijan Pregelj =

Slovenian writer (born 1970)

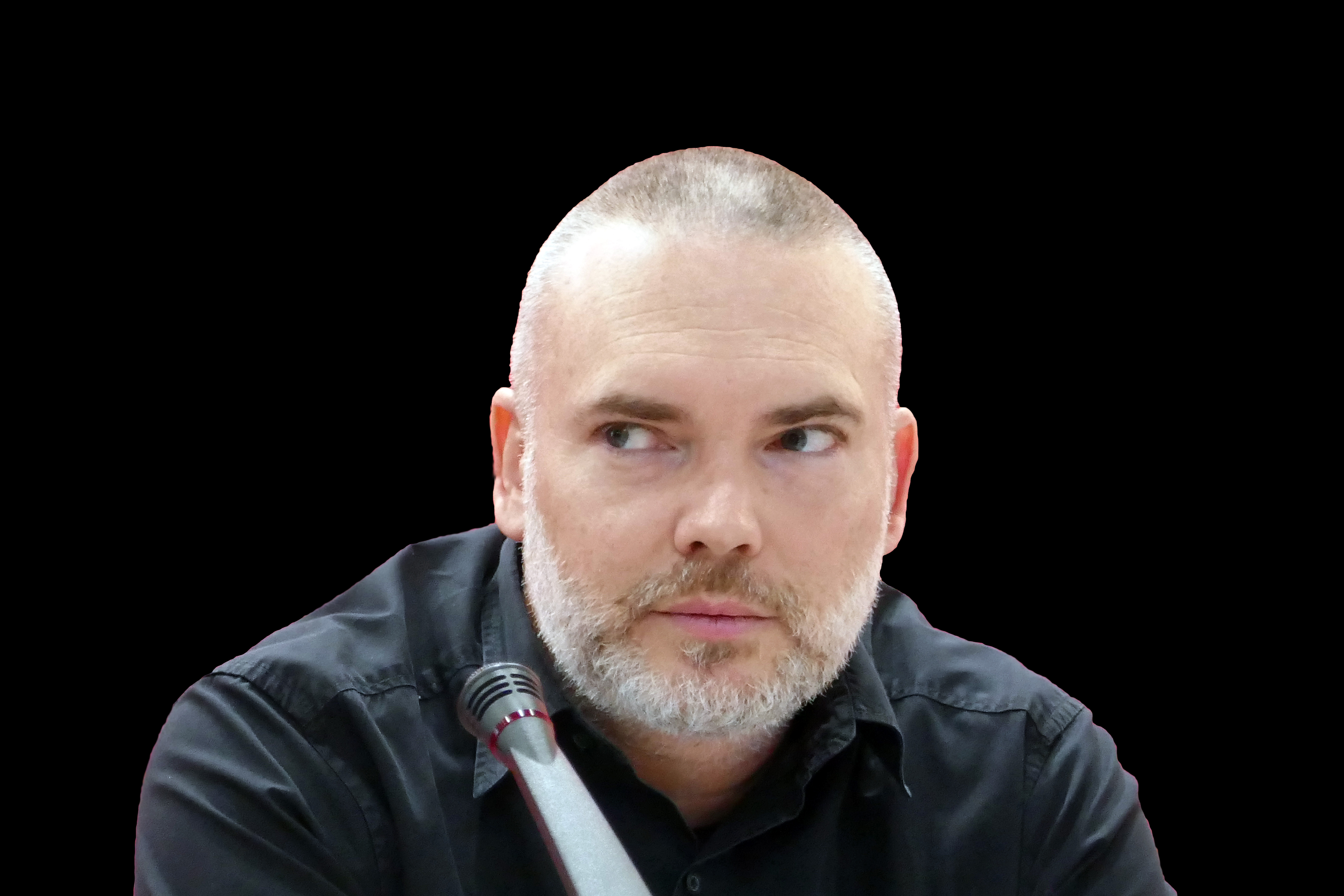
- Sebastijan Pregelj (Leipzig Book Fair 2018)
- Born: 29 July 1970; Ljubljana, Slovenia
- Occupation: Writer
- Website: www.sebastijan-pregelj.com

Sebastijan Pregelj (born 29 July 1970) is a Slovenian writer. He was born in Ljubljana and has been publishing stories in literary journals since 1992. He is the author of eight novels, four collections of short stories and numerous books for children and young readers.

Pregelj is primarily known as a novelist. Five of his novels have been finalists for the Kresnik Award, Slovenia's major award for the novel. His fiction often combines historical settings and contemporary reality with elements of legend, the fantastic and the mystical.

In 2020, Pregelj received the Cankar Award for the novel V Elvisovi sobi (In Elvis's Room). The novel follows a generation coming of age during the final years of Yugoslavia and the period leading to Slovenian independence. It has been published in Italian, Croatian, English, Swedish and Armenian translation.

Pregelj's novels have been translated into English, German, Italian, Swedish, Croatian and Macedonian. His short stories have appeared in anthologies published in Slovenian, German, Czech, English and Polish. The English translation of Kronika pozabljanja, published as A Chronicle of Forgetting, was nominated for the 2021 International Dublin Literary Award.

Since 2014, Pregelj has also written for children and young readers. His children's books include the two Duh Babujan books, the seven-volume Zgodbe s konca kamene dobe series, the Zgodbe vojvodine Kranjske series and the Medo in Pujsi picture books. Zgodbe s konca kamene dobe is set among the prehistoric pile-dwellers of the Ljubljana Marshes, while Zgodbe vojvodine Kranjske is set in the period of the seventeenth-century scholar Johann Weikhard von Valvasor.

The Medo in Pujsi stories first appeared in the children's magazine Cicido and were later published as picture books. They were also adapted for the stage by the Ljubljana Puppet Theatre, where Medo in Pujsi premiered in 2024.

The sixth volume of Zgodbe s konca kamene dobe, Vrnitev (The Return), received the Večernica Award in 2021. All seven books in the series have received the Golden Pear quality label.

Pregelj is a member of the Slovene Writers' Association and the Slovene PEN Centre. He lives and works in Ljubljana.

== Bibliography ==
=== Novels ===
- Leta milosti (Years of Mercy) (2004)
- Na terasi babilonskega stolpa (On the Terrace of the Tower of Babel) (2008)
- Mož, ki je jahal tigra (The Man Who Rode a Tiger) (2010)
- Pod srečno zvezdo (Under a Lucky Star) (2013)
- Kronika pozabljanja (A Chronicle of Forgetting) (2014)
- Vdih. Izdih. (Breathe In. Breathe Out.) (2017)
- V Elvisovi sobi (In Elvis's Room) (2019)
- Beli konjiček (The White Horse) (2023)

=== Collections of short stories ===
- Burkači, skrunilci in krivoprisežniki (Jesters, Desecrators and Perjurers) (1996)
- Cirilina roža (Cirila's Flower) (1999)
- Svinje brez biserov (Swine Without Pearls) (2002)
- Prebujanja (Awakenings) (2011)

=== Children's literature ===
==== Medo in Pujsi (Bear and Piggie) ====
- Medo in Pujsi 1 (Bear and Piggie 1) (2023)
- Medo in Pujsi 2: Prosim in hvala (Bear and Piggie 2: Please and Thank You) (2024)
- Medo in Pujsi 3: Najboljša prijatelja (Bear and Piggie 3: Best Friends) (2025)

==== Zgodbe vojvodine Kranjske (Tales from the Duchy of Carniola) ====
- Coprnica pod gradom (The Witch Below the Castle), Book 1 (2022)
- Zmaj nad mestom (The Dragon Above the Town), Book 2 (2023)
- Pošast iz jezera (The Monster from the Lake), Book 3 (2024)
- Duh iz vodnjaka (The Ghost from the Well), Book 4 (2025)

==== Zgodbe s konca kamene dobe (Tales from the End of the Stone Age) ====
- Deček Brin na domačem kolišču (Brin the Boy at His Home Pile-Dwelling), Book 1 (2016)
- Do konca jezera in naprej (To the End of the Lake and Beyond), Book 2 (2016)
- K morju (To the Sea), Book 3 (2017)
- Pri kamnitem stolpu (At the Stone Tower), Book 4 (2018)
- V snegu in ledu (In Snow and Ice), Book 5 (2019)
- Vrnitev (The Return), Book 6 (2020)
- Nov dom (A New Home), Book 7 (2021)

==== Duh Babujan (Babujan the Ghost) ====
- Duh Babujan in prijatelji (Babujan the Ghost and His Friends) (2014)
- Duh Babujan in nepričakovana selitev (Babujan the Ghost and the Unexpected Move) (2016)

==== Other children's books ====
- Skozi šivankino uho (Through the Eye of a Needle) (2023)

=== Other ===
- Literarne poti Ljubljane (Literary Trails of Ljubljana) (2010), literary guide, co-written with Gašper Troha

=== Anthologies containing works by Pregelj ===
- Čas kratke zgodbe (The Time of the Short Story) (1998)
- Die Zeit der kurzen Geschichte (The Time of the Short Story) (2001)
- Vně hranic: antologie současné slovinské krátké prózy (Beyond the Borders: An Anthology of Contemporary Slovenian Short Prose) (2002)
- A Lazy Sunday Afternoon (2007)
- Noc w Lublanie (A Night in Ljubljana) (2009)
- Ljubljana Tales (2012)
- Ereignis in der Stadt (An Event in the City) (2023)
- It's Already the Morning of the Last Day (2023)
- Brez Milosti (Without Mercy) (2023)

=== Translations ===
- Ljubljana Literary Trail (2011); English translation of Literarne poti Ljubljane
- Auf der Terrasse des Turms von Babel (2013); German translation of Na terasi babilonskega stolpa, Drava Verlag
- Unter einem glücklichen Stern (2015); German translation of Pod srečno zvezdo, Drava Verlag
- Das Gespenst Babujan und seine Freunde (2017); German translation of Duh Babujan in prijatelji, Drava Verlag
- Das Gespenst Babujan und der unerwartete Umzug (2017); German translation of Duh Babujan in nepričakovana selitev, Drava Verlag
- Chronik des Vergessens (2017); German translation of Kronika pozabljanja, Drava Verlag
- Vdišuvanje. Izdišuvanje. (2019); Macedonian translation of Vdih. Izdih., Goten
- A Chronicle of Forgetting (2019); English translation of Kronika pozabljanja, translated by Rawley Grau, Litterae Slovenicae
- Il giorno in cui finì l'estate (2022); Italian translation of V Elvisovi sobi, Bottega Errante Edizioni
- U Elvisovoj sobi (2023); Croatian translation of V Elvisovi sobi, Sandorf
- Kronika zaborava (2023); Croatian translation of Kronika pozabljanja, Edicije Božičević
- In Elvis's Room (2023); English translation of V Elvisovi sobi, translated by Rawley Grau, Sandorf Passage
- I Elvis rum (2024); Swedish translation of V Elvisovi sobi, Rámus Förlag
- Էլվիսի սենյակում (2026); Armenian translation of V Elvisovi sobi, Edge Publishing

== Awards and honours ==
- Cankar Award:
  - 2020 – winner for V Elvisovi sobi (In Elvis's Room)
- Večernica Award:
  - 2021 – winner for Vrnitev (The Return), the sixth book in the Zgodbe s konca kamene dobe series
- Golden Pear Label:
  - 7 books from the Zgodbe s konca kamene dobe series
  - 4 books from the Zgodbe vojvodine Kranjske series
  - 3 books from the Medo in Pujsi series

== Nominations ==
- Kresnik Award:
  - 2005 – finalist for Leta milosti
  - 2009 – finalist for Na terasi babilonskega stolpa
  - 2011 – finalist for Mož, ki je jahal tigra
  - 2015 – top ten for Kronika pozabljanja
  - 2020 – finalist for V Elvisovi sobi
- International Dublin Literary Award:
  - 2021 – nominated for A Chronicle of Forgetting
  - 2025 – nominated for In Elvis's Room
- Desetnica Award:
  - 2017 – nominated for Deček Brin na domačem kolišču
  - 2018 – nominated for Do konca jezera in naprej
  - 2022 – nominated for Vrnitev
  - 2023 – nominated for Coprnica pod gradom
- Večernica Award:
  - 2023 – nominated for Coprnica pod gradom
  - 2024 – nominated for Zmaj nad mestom
