= Katja Perat =

Slovenian writer

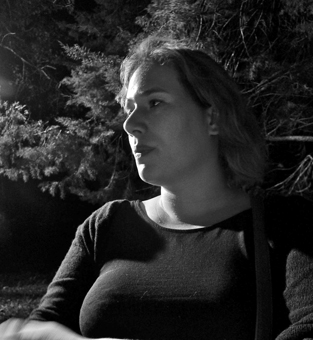
- Katja Perat in 2015
- Born: January 7, 1988 (age 38)
- Education: University of Ljubljana, Washington University in St. Louis
- Occupation: Writer
- Writing career
- Language: Slovenian
- Notable work: The Masochist

Katja Perat (born January 7, 1988) is a Slovenian novelist, essayist, and poet currently based in the U.S. A graduate of Philosophy and Comparative Literature from the University of Ljubljana Faculty of Arts, her books of poetry have been nominated for numerous awards in Slovenia. Her work has been noted for its frequent criticism of the Slovene national press.

== Biography ==
Perat published her first poems in the Slovene literary magazine Literatura and in the bilingual Slovenian-Bosnian magazine Dignimo pero/Dvignimo pero in 2007. Perat's debut poetry collection, "The Best Have Fallen" (Najboljši so padli), was published in 2011. It was awarded Best Debut Award and the Kritiško sito Award, for best book of the year, by the Slovenian Literary Critics’ Association. In 2014, her second book of poetry, "Value-Added Tax" (Davek na dodano vrednost), was nominated for both the Jenko Award by the Slovene Writers' Association and the Veronika Award for the year's best book of poetry.

In 2014, Perat's work appeared alongside poet Eileen Myles in the third issue of Poetic Series, Fear of Language, published by Sternberg Press. Her novel, "The Masochist" (Mazohistka), was first published in the Slovene in 2018. Translated into English by Michael Biggins and published by Istros Books in 2020, it was long-listed for the Kresnik Award for best novel in 2019. She is a co-editor of AirBeletrina, an online Slovene magazine, and a journalist for the weekly publication, Mladina. In addition to academic and news articles, she has also authored a volume of collected essays, "Make America Graspable Again" (Naredite Ameriko spet obvladljivo), published in 2019.

Currently, Perat is a doctoral student in comparative literature at Washington University in St. Louis where she received the Divided City Fellowship in 2020.

== Bibliography ==
- Perat, Katja (2011), The Best Have Fallen, Najboljši so padli, Ljubljana, Slovenia: Študentska založba, ISBN 9789612423438
- Perat, Katja (2014), Value-Added Tax, Davek na dodano vrednost, Ljubljana, Slovenia: LUD Literatura, ISBN 9789616952088
- Perat, Katja (2014), Fear of Language, Berlin, Germany: Sternberg Press, ISBN 9783956790751
- Perat, Katja (2020), The Masochist, translated by Michael Biggins, London, UK: Istros Books, ISBN 9781912545179
