= Cankar Award =

Slovenian literary award

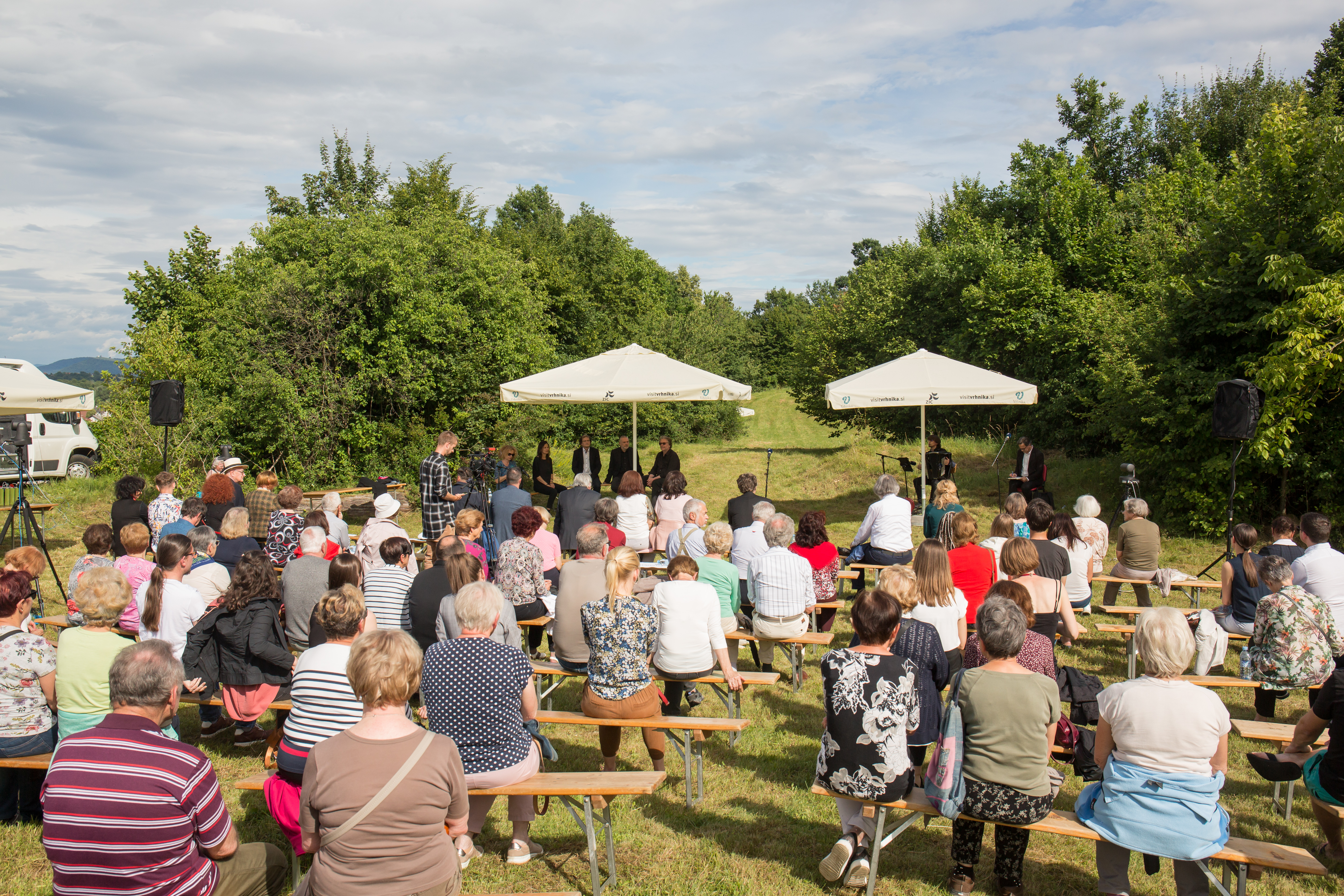
- 2020 Cankar Award Ceremony
- Awarded for: Best new Slovenian novel
- Sponsored by: Slovenian PEN; Slovenian Academy of Sciences and Arts; Research Centre of the Slovenian Academy of Sciences and Arts; University of Ljubljana
- Location: Vrhnika
- Country: Slovenia
- First award: 2019
- 2024: Denis Škofič
- Website: cankarjeva-nagrada.si

The Cankar Award (Slovene: Cankarjeva nagrada) is a literary award established in 2019 by the Slovenian PEN, Slovenian Academy of Sciences and Arts, Research Centre of the Slovenian Academy of Sciences and Arts and the University of Ljubljana. It is named after Ivan Cankar, Slovene writer, playwright, essayist, poet, and political activist. The first award was given in 2020. The Cankar Award honours the best original literary work in Slovenia, celebrating genres in which Ivan Cankar excelled. The award initially consisted of a €5,000 prize and a diploma. In 2024 the amount was increased to €7,000 .

== History ==
The award was established in 2019 with the first one awarded in 2020 in Vrhnika. The inaugural nominees for the 2020 award were Vinko Möderndorfer, Sebastijan Pregelj, Simona Semenič and Brane Senegačnik. The 2023 nominees were Katja Gorečan, Adriana Kuči, Mojca Kumerdej, Mirana Likar and Lado Kralj.

== Winners ==
Year	Photo	Author(s)	Novel	Finalists	Ref
2026		Nina Dragičević	Nemogoče	Ajda Bračič, Kresničevje; Anja Radaljac, Če se ne vrneš; Tina Volarič, Nekje notri je uho; Aljoša Harlamov, Dohtar in Povodni mož	
2025		Barbara Korun	Vnazaj	Milan Dekleva, Lističi; Feri Lainšček, Kurja fizika; Nataša Kramberger, Po vsej sili živ; Muanis Sinanović, Vse luči	
2024		Denis Škofič	Tuskulum	Pia Prezelj, Težka voda; Anja Mugerli, Pričakovanja; Mateja Gomboc, Gorica; Aleš Šteger, Na kraju zapisano	
2023		Mojca Kumerdej	Gluha soba	Katja Gorečan, Materinsko knjižico; Adriana Kuči, Ime mi je Sarajevo; Lado Kralj, Ne bom se več drsal na bajerju; Mirana Likar, Žensko hišo	
2022		Simona Semenič	Tri igre za punce	Nina Dragičević, To telo; Dušan Šarotar, Zvezdna karta	
2021		Gašper Kralj	Škrbine	Andrej Blatnik, Luknje; Mirana Likar, Pripovedovalec; Lucija Stepančič, Naj me kdo zbudi	
2020		Sebastijan Pregelj	V Elvisovi sobi	Vinko Möderndorfer, Ljudomrznik na tržnici; Simona Semenič, To jabolko, zlato; Brane Senegačnik, Pogovori z nikomer	

== See also ==
- Slovene literature
- Prešeren Award
