= Katarina Marinčič =

Slovene writer and literary historian (born 1968)

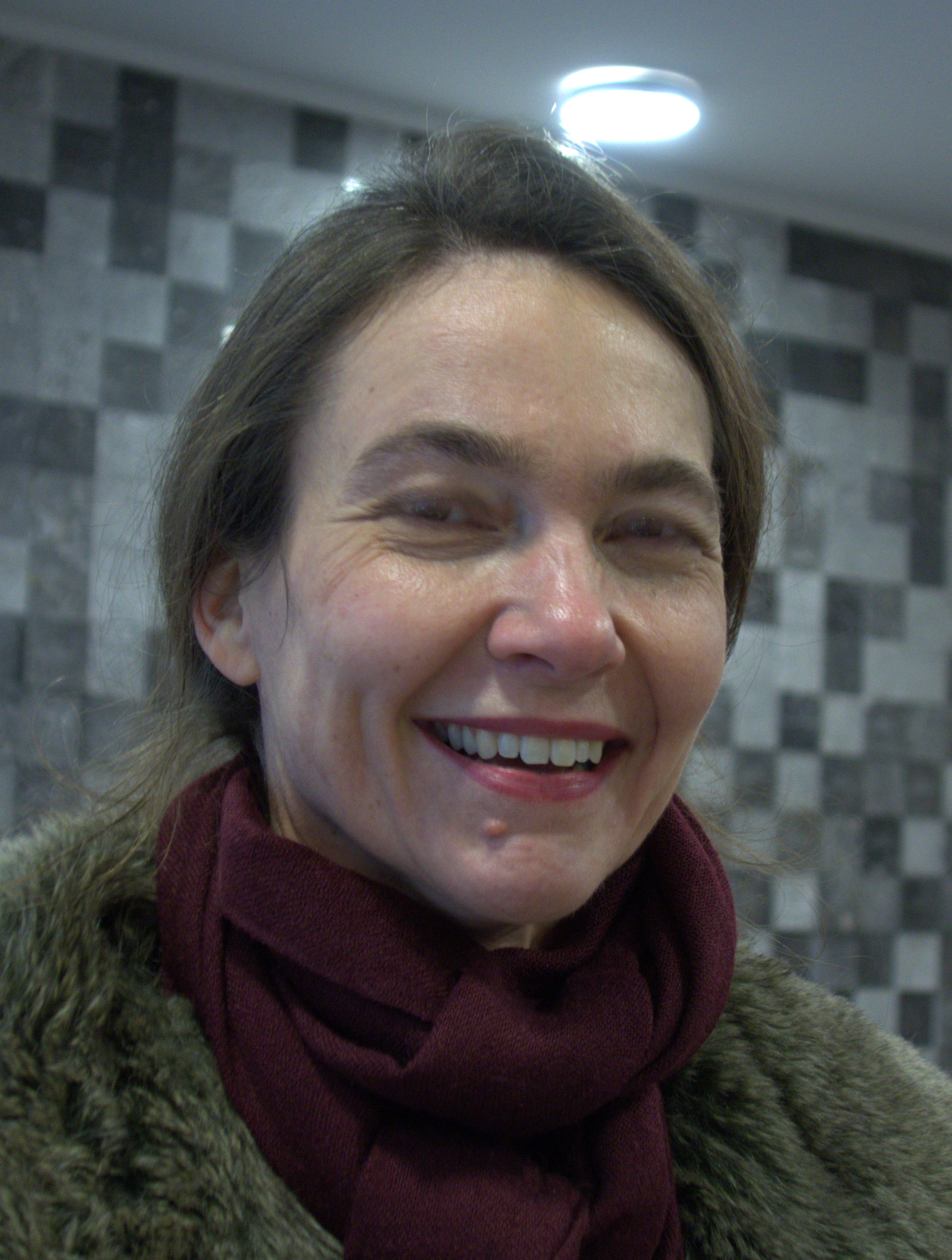
- Born: 25 June 1968; Ljubljana, Socialist Federal Republic of Yugoslavia (now in Slovenia)
- Occupations: Writer, literary historian
- Writing career
- Notable works: Prikrita harmonija, O treh
- Notable awards: Kresnik Award; 2002 Prikrita harmonija Fabula Award; 2007 O treh

Katarina Marinčič (born 25 June 1968) is a Slovene writer and literary historian. She has a PhD in French literature and teaches and is a member of the Senate at the Arts Faculty at the University of Ljubljana.

In 2002 Marinčič won the Kresnik Award for her novel Prikrita harmonija (Hidden Harmony). The novel is a family chronicle set in the period around the First World War. In 2007 she won the Fabula Award for best collection of short prose in Slovene published within the previous two years for her book O treh (About The Three).

== Selected works ==
- Tereza, novel, (1989)
- Rožni vrt, novel, (1992)
- Prikrita harmonija (Hidden Harmony), novel, (2001)
- O treh (About The Three), three novellas, (2005)
