= Aleš Šteger =

Slovene poet, writer, translator and editor

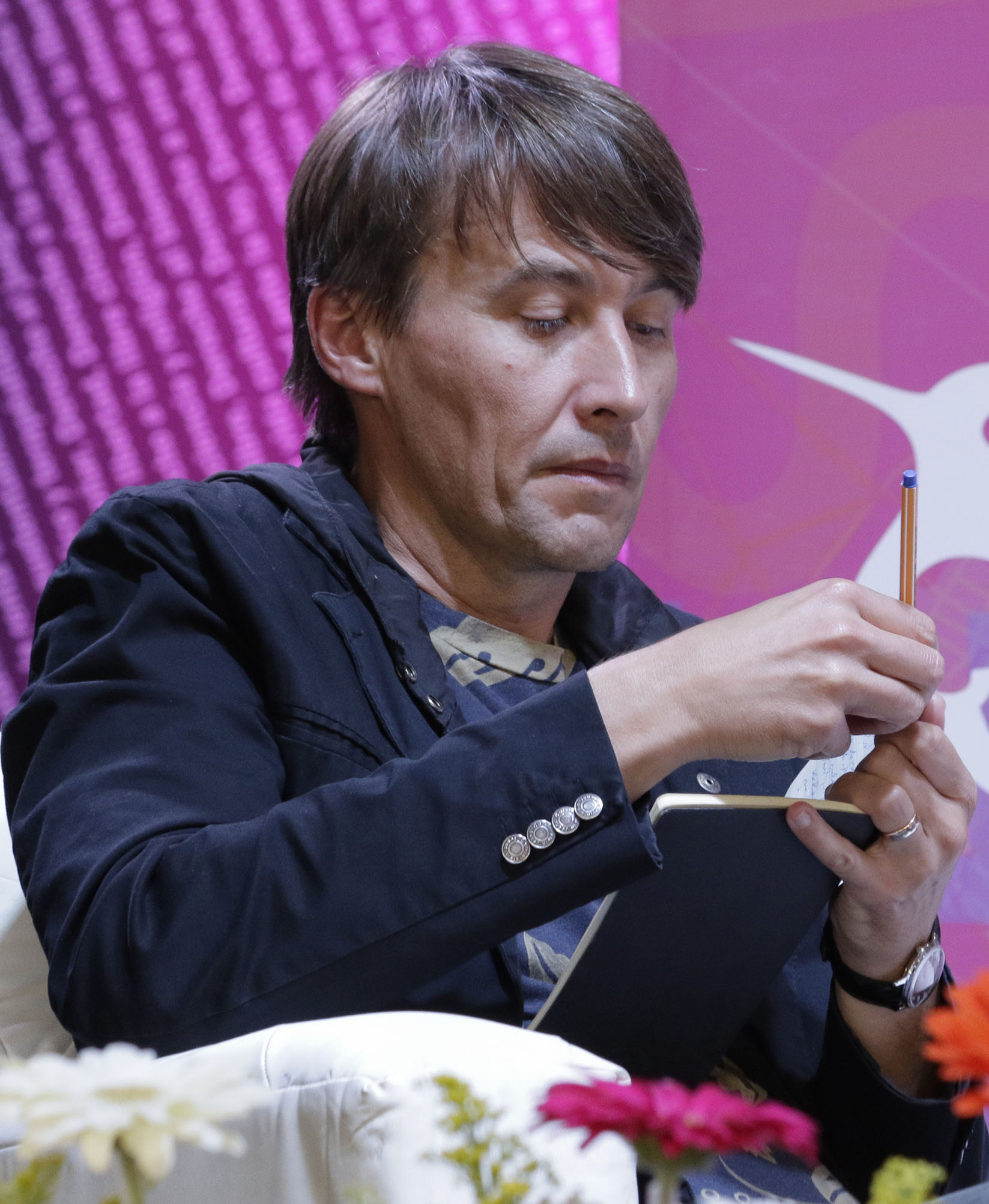
- Born: 31 May 1973; Ptuj, Socialist Federal Republic of Yugoslavia (now in Slovenia)
- Occupations: poet, writer, editor, translator, literary critic
- Writing career
- Notable works: Šahovnice ur, Kašmir, Knjiga reči
- Notable awards: Veronika Award; 1998 for Kašmir; Rožanc Award; 2007 for Berlin

Aleš Šteger (born 31 May 1973) is a Slovene poet, writer, translator and editor. Aleš belongs to a generation of writers that started to publish right after the fall of Yugoslavia. His first poetry collection Šahovnice ur (1995) was sold out in three weeks after publication and indicated a new generation of Slovenian artists and writers.

== Career ==
Aleš studied Comparative Literature (graduated in 2003) and German at the Faculty of Arts in Ljubljana. He is co-founder and program director of Beletrina publishing house. He is one of the founders of the Days of Poetry and Wine and its program director from 1996 to 2004 and from 2014 to 2022. He is the founder of the international poetry platform Versopolis.

Šteger's poetry collections and novels have been translated into more than 20 languages and published in journals such as The New Yorker, Süddeutsche Zeitung, Lettre International and Boston Review. He often works interdisciplinary with other artists.

Soon after the publication of his first books of poetry, his poetry became known outside his homeland. This was followed by travelogues, novels and experimental writing (Written on Site project 2012–2023).

Šteger is a member of Berlin Academy of Arts and the German Academy for Language and Literature.

Šteger was a judge for the 2021 Griffin Poetry Prize. In 2024 he was nominated for the Cankar Award.

== Special projects and collaborations with other artists ==
Šteger has been performing for several years together with the accordionist Jure Tori, with whom he created a" poetic ritual" and "historical cabaret" about Aleš's grandfather Matija Zorec during the Second World War, My War Accordion, directed by Jernej Lorencij, premiered on 6 January 2023 in the production of Cankarjev dom, Ljubljana.

He has collaborated with musicians and composers, most notably Vito Žuraj, for whom he wrote the libretto for the composition der Verwandler/Alchemis t, which was premiered at the Eclat Festival in Stuttgart, Germany, 2019.

He co-wrote the screenplay for the documentary feature film Beyond Boundaries (2016) directed by Peter Zach.

Aleš has collaborated with painter Dušan Fišer (V tvari project), photographer Stojan Kerbler (book What I Saw in Ptuj and Elsewhere) and several other visual artists.

In 2017, he was invited as a poet to create a visual artwork for the international Kochi Muziris Biennale in India. His creation, a 14-metre-high pyramid with an internal labyrinth and a sound installation of a poem about exile, The Pyramide of Exiled Poets, soon became one of the highlights of the Biennale.

== As editor and translator ==
Together with Matthias Göritz and Amalia Maček, he edited the anthology of contemporary Slovenian poetry Mein Nachbar auf der Wolke, Hanser, Munich, 2023.

He has edited selected poems by Edvard Kocbek, Gregor Strniša, Dane Zajc, Tomaž Šalamun and Niko Grafenauer, for which he has also written extensive accompanying studies.

Together with Jernej Katona Zajc, he compiled the book In Words, a selection of poems and excerpts from texts by Danet Zajc.

On the occasion of the publication of six posthumous books by Tomaž Šalamun, published under the title Jutro (Beletrina, 2018), he published a 70-page conversation with the poet and friend, part of what Aleš and Tomaž had planned as a joint project that was never completed.

As a translator, Aleš translates from German and Spanish, including books by Gottfried Benn (Doppelleben), Ingeborg Bachmann (Selected Poems), César Vallejo (Poemas humanos), Walter Benjamin (Berliner Kindheit um 1900) and Olga Orozco (Selected Poems).

He is married to social anthropologist Maja Petrović-Šteger. They have a son.

== Books in English translations ==
- Burning Tongues, New and Selected Poems. Bloodaxe, 2022. (poetry)
- The Book of Bodies, White Pine Press. Buffalo, NY, 2022. (poetry)
- Above the Sky beneath the Earth, White Pine Press, Buffalo NY, 2019 (poetry)
- Clear Shadow, Factory Hollow Press. North Amherst, 2019. (poetry chapbook)
- Absolution, Istros Books, London, 2017. (novel)
- Berlin, Counterpath, Denver, USA. (short prose)
- The Book of Things, BOA Editions, Rochester, USA, 2010. (poetry)

== Original publications ==
Poems

- Šahovnice ur, (Chessboards of Hours) 1995
- Kašmir, (Kashmere) 1997
- Protuberance, (Protuberances) 2002
- Knjiga reči, (The Book of Things) 2005
- Knjiga teles, (The Book of Bodies) 2010
- Nad nebom pod zemljo, (Above the Sky Below the Earth) 2015
- Pričevanje, (Testimony) 2021
- Svet je vmes, (The World is In Between) 2022

Prose

- Včasih je januar sredi poletja, (Sometimes it's January in the middle of summer) travel novel, 1997
- Berlin, short fiction, 2007
- Odpusti, (Absolution), novel 2014
- Kurent, young adult novel 2015
- Neverend, novel, 2017
- Bogovi se nam smejijo, (Laughter of Gods) 6 novellas 2022

Eseji

- S prsti in peto, (With Fingers and Heels), 2009
- Kar sem videl na Ptuju in drugod (What I Saw in Ptuj and Elsewhere), Essays/Photographs, 2021
- Gebrauchanweisung Slowenien (written in German), essays on Slovenia 2022
- Na kraju zapisano (Written on Site project 2012–2023), 2023

== Slovenian awards ==
- Slovenian Book Fair Prize for a debut book of the last two years 1996
- Veronika Prize 1998 for the poetry collection Kashmir
- Rožančeva prize 2007 for the book Berlin
- The Great Oljenka of the Municipality of Ptuj 2017
- Krilata želva Award for the best travelogue of 2018 for Written on Site
- Pretnar Award 2021

== International awards ==
- Writing Fellowship at Akademie Schloss Solitude, Stuttgart, 2001
- Abraham Woursell Foundation Fellowship, New York, 2002
- International Poetry Prize "Poetic Sceptre 2006" (awarded by the Writers' Association of Macedonia)
- BTBA (Best translated book award), USA, 2011 for the translation of The Book of Things
- AATSEL (American Association of Teachers of Slavic and East European Languages) award for the best translation of a literary work from Slavic languages into English 2011 for The Book of Things
- the title "chavalier de l'ordre des arts et des lettres" awarded by the Minister of Culture of the French Republic
- International Horst Bienek Prize of the Bavarian Academy of Arts for Poetry 2016
- International Prize of the City of Zug Spycher 2022, for the German translation of the novel Neverend
- Alfred Kolleritsch Prize of the City of Graz 2021, Austria, for services to literature
- ITB Berlin Tourist Exchange Prize 2023 for the book of essays on Slovenien Gebrauchsanweisung Slowenien (originally written in German)
- Nuevo Siglo de Oro International Poetry Prize, Mexico, 2023 for a poetic oeuvre

== Quotes ==
3:AM Magazine, Maintenant #45

“Šteger focuses on things, a central concern of European philosophy ever since Husserl, and of European poetry since Rilke. Šteger takes an original approach to this question by not systematically pursuing the “thing-in-itself” and attempting to bring words as close as possible to it, as Francis Ponge did.”

Poetry Today, The Antioch Review, Volume 70, Number 1, 2012 about “The Book of Things”

"Steger has a tremendous capacity for juxtaposition, and the poems offer a great many startlingly moments…[His] flair is in not pausing at the virtuoso moment but brushing past as it drops."

Rain Taxi

"…the things described in this book are defamiliarized and here, often, Steger is at his best. The way he personifies an object, or the metaphor he uses, is never obvious, but it always makes complete sense."

Three Percent Review, "The Book of Things"

"...a smart, startling, and wildly pleasurable book.”

Kenyon Review (online), "The Book of Things"

Steger's efforts sometimes bring to mind such Western European figures as Francis Ponge and Craig Raine, who also sought to make household things look new and strange. Yet Steger brings a melancholy Central European sense of history- his objects tend to remember, or cause, great pain: “It pours, this poisonous, sweet force,” Steger writes of “Saliva,” “Between teeth, when you spit your own little genocide.”

Publishers Weekly, “The Book of Things”

It is a rare treat to have an English translation before the ink has dried on the original. By which I mean, a mere five years after the book's Slovenian publication, Brian Henry has brought these poems to life for those of us not lucky enough to read Slovenian. Henry's translations are impressive for sheer acrobatics.

Guernica, a Magazine of Art and Politics, “The Book Of Things”
