= Miloš Mikeln =

Slovene writer, playwright, theatre director and journalist

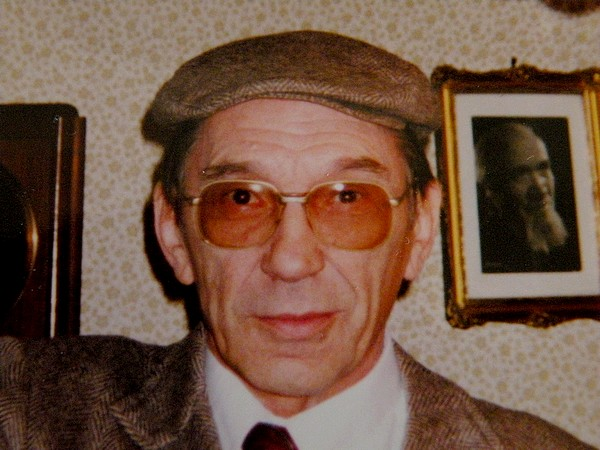
- Miloš Mikeln in 2011
- Born: 23 May 1930; Celje, Kingdom of Yugoslavia, now in Slovenia
- Died: 1 April 2014 (aged 83)
- Occupations: writer, playwright, theatre director

Miloš Mikeln (23 May 1930 – 1 April 2014) was a Slovene writer, playwright, theatre director and journalist. He served as the president of Slovene PEN and was the initiator of the Writers for Peace Committee, founded in 1984. He was the Committee chairman for the first decade of its existence. The Committee still continue to operate within the fold of PEN International to this day, providing a platform for literary and intercultural dialogue and understanding.

== Life ==
Mikeln was born Alojz Martin Mikeln in Celje in 1930. He attended school in Celje until 1947 when he moved to Ljubljana where he first studied comparative literature at the University of Ljubljana and in 1952 enrolled at the Academy for Theatre, Radio, Film and Television.Throughout his career he worked in theatres in Kranj and Ljubljana, as an editor at the newspapers Delo and Naši razgledi and as Director of the Cankarjeva založba publishing house.

In 1993 he received the Kresnik Award for his novel Veliki voz (The Great Bear). In 1995 he was given the Silver Order of Freedom of the Republic of Slovenia for his work with Writers for Peace.

== Selected works ==
- Veliki voz (The Great Bear), novel, 1992
- Poročnik z Vipote (Lieutenant from Vipota), novel, 2002
- Mesto ob reki (Riverside Town), short stories, 2008

== Plays ==
- Dež v pomladni noči (Rain on a Spring Night), drama, 1955
- Atomske bombe ni več (The Atom Bomb is No More), youth play, 1956
- Petra Šeme pozna poroka (The Late Marriage of Peter Šema), comedy, 1957
- Golobje miru (Doves of Peace), comedy, 1960
- Strip strup denarja kup (Funny Runny Pots of Money), youth play, 1964
- Stalinovi zdravniki (Stalin's Doctors), drama, 1972
- Afera Madragol (The Madragol Affair), comedy, 1977
- Miklavžev večer (The Eve of St Nicholas'), comedy, 1998

== Satirical prose ==
- Jugoslavija za začetnike (Yugoslavia for Beginners), 1967
- Kako se je naša dolina privadila svobodi (How Our Valley Got Used to Freedom), 1973
- Adolfa Hitlerja tretja svetovna vojna in kratki kurz vladanja za začetnike, (Adolf Hitler's Third World War and a Short Course in Ruling for Beginners), 1980
- Zgaga vojvodine Kranjske, (All this Fuss in the Duchy of Carniola) 1985
- Poročilo delovne skupine za ruiniranje države in kratki kurz Vladanje za srednjo (usmerjeno) stopnjo (Report of the Working Committee for the Ruination of the State and a Short Course in Ruling for Intermediate Level), 1989

== Biography ==
- Stalin: življenjska pot samodržca (Biography of Stalin), 1985
