= Dino Bauk =

Slovenian lawyer and writer

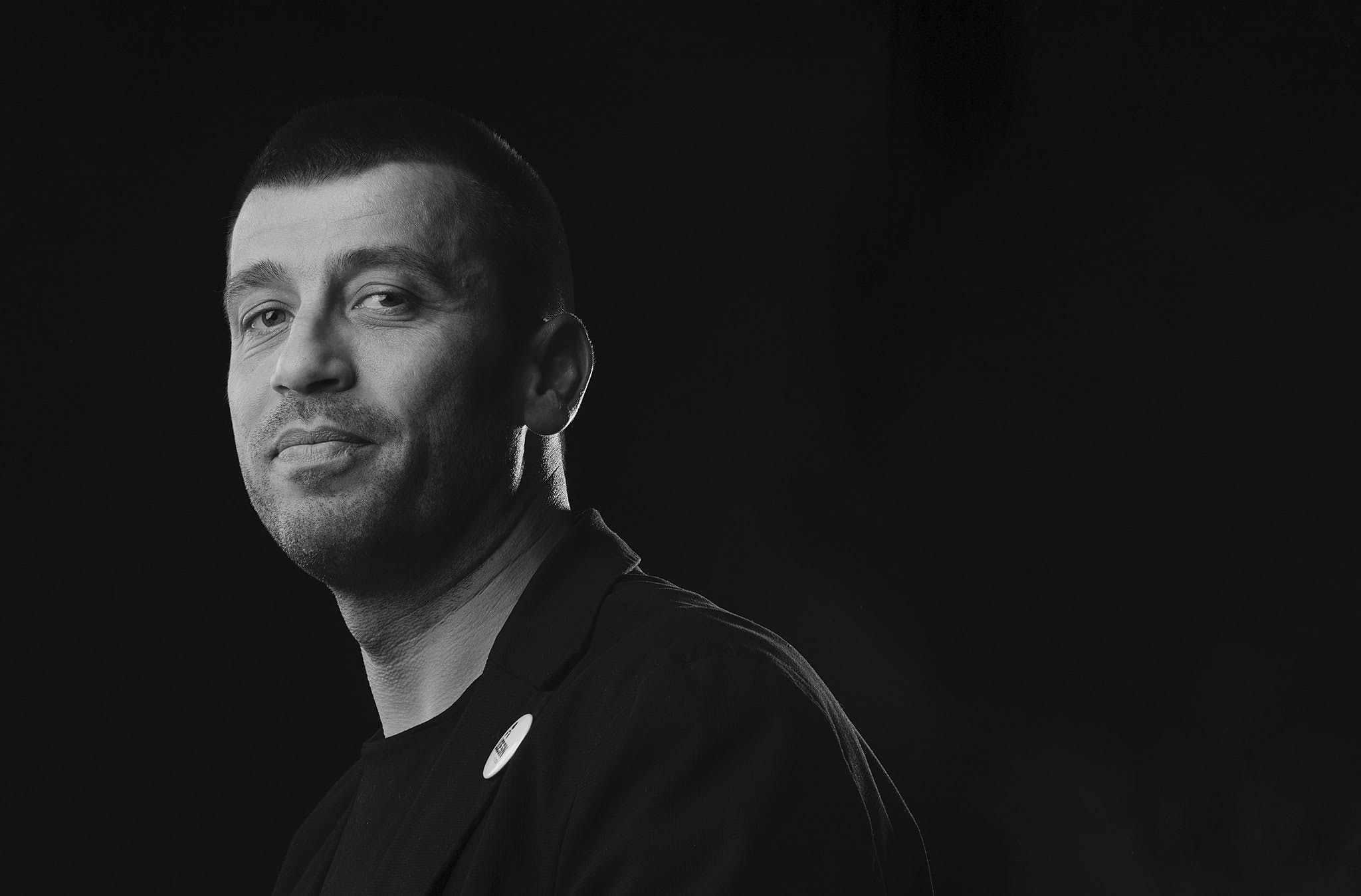

Dino Bauk (born 1972) is a Slovenian lawyer and writer. A former civil servant, he achieved literary prominence with his debut novel The End. And Again (Konec. Znova, 2015). The book won the Best Debut Award at the Slovenian Book Fair and was longlisted for the Kresnik Award for best novel of the year. He is also known for his short stories and his columns in the Slovenian weekly Mladina.
