= Mojca Kumerdej =

Writer, philosopher and critic

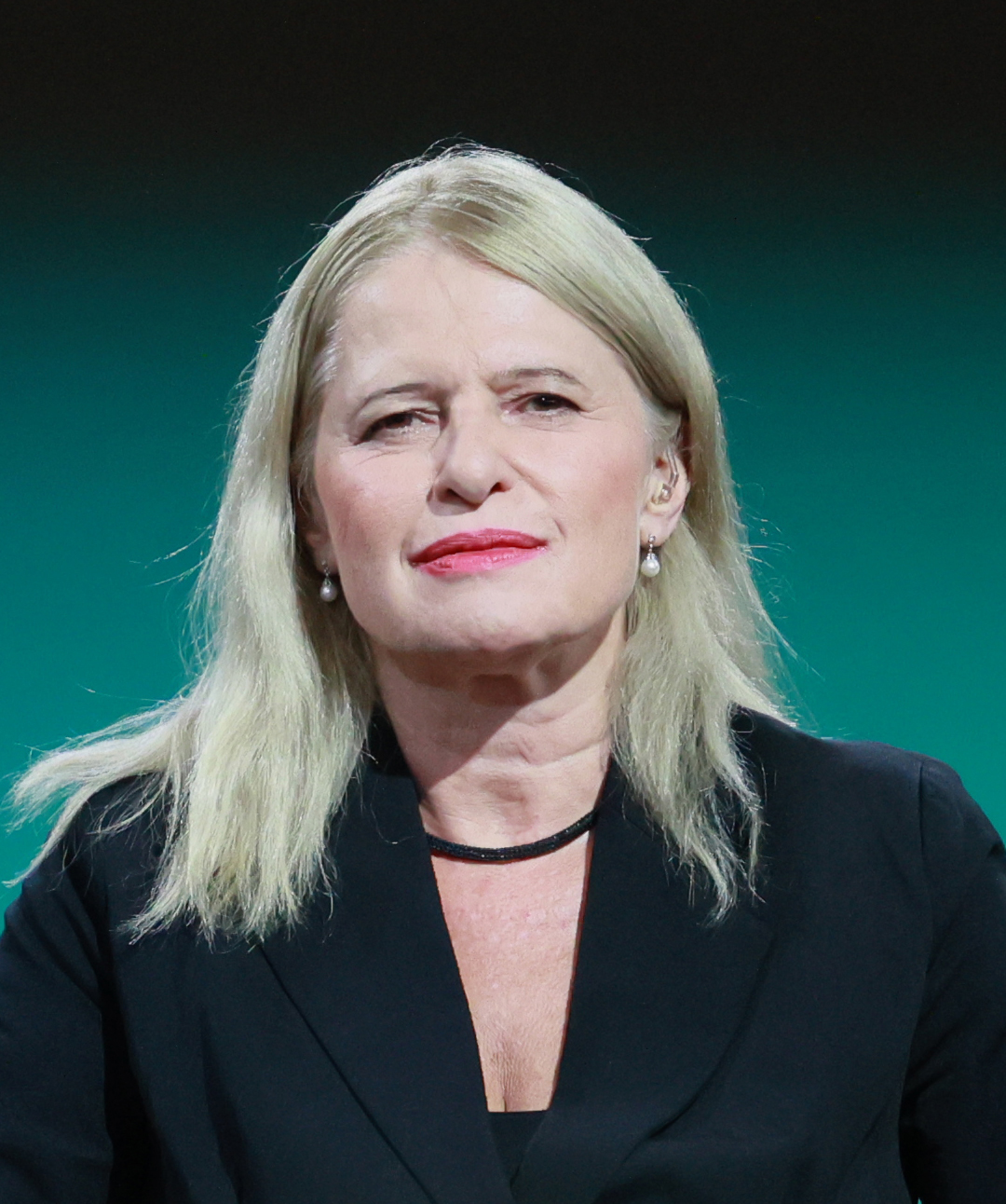
- Kumerdej (2023)
- Born: 1964 (age 61–62)
- Occupations: Writer, philosopher, critic
- Writing career
- Notable works: Fragma, Temna snov

Mojca Kumerdej (born 1964) is a Slovene writer, philosopher and critic. She works as the cultural chronicler for the daily newspaper Delo.

== Biography ==
Kumerdej graduated in philosophy and sociology of culture from the University of Ljubljana. Her debut novel Krst nad Triglavom (The Baptism over Mount Triglav) is a parody and a witty and ironical revision of one of Slovene literary history's most important works, the epic poem Krst pri Savici (The Baptism at the Savica) by France Prešeren. Her next two published books, Fragma and Temna snov, are collections of short stories. Her stories have been translated into many languages and have been published in various Slovene and foreign literary journals and anthologies.

In 2017, Kumerdej received a Prešeren Fund Award for her second novel Kronosova žetev. In 2023 she received annual Cankar Award.

== Published works ==
- Krst nad Triglavom (The Baptism over Mount Triglav), novel, (2001)
- Fragma (Fragma), short stories, (2003)
- Temna snov (Dark Matter), short stories, (2011)
- Kronosova žetev (Chronos' Harvest), novel (2016)
