= Lojze Kovačič =

Slovenian writer

- Born: 9 November 1928; Basel, Switzerland
- Died: 1 May 2004 (aged 75); Ljubljana, Slovenia
- Occupation: writer
- Spouse: Marija Vida Kovačič née.Sever
- Children: Jani Kovačič
- Writing career
- Notable works: The Newcomers, Crystal Time, Things of Childhood
- Notable awards: Prešeren Award; 1973 for Sporočila v spanju – Resničnost; Kresnik Award; 1991 Kristalni čas Kresnik Award; 2004 Otroške stvari

Lojze Kovačič (9 November 1928 – 1 May 2004) was a Slovene writer. His novel The Newcomers (Slovene: Prišleki) is often considered one of the most important Slovene novels of the 20th century and has been translated into German, French, Spanish, English and Dutch.

Kovačič was born to a Slovene father and a German mother in Basel, Switzerland in 1928. When his patriotic father refused Swiss citizenship, his family was expelled from Switzerland in 1938 and moved first to rural Lower Carniola and then to Ljubljana, just at the outbreak of the Second World War. His father's death in 1944 shifted the burden of supporting the family onto Lojze. At the end of the war, the mere fact that they were half German made them suspicious and the whole family apart from Lojze were deported. Lojze remained despite frequent confrontations with the authorities. In 1962 he graduated in Slavic and Germanic Studies from the Faculty of Education of the University of Ljubljana. He found employment as an art and puppetry teacher in Ljubljana, and from 1978 to his retirement in 1989 he was also involved in literary education. Literary recognition did not come until the 1970s. Many of his novels are highly autobiographical. He received a number of awards, including the Prešeren Award in 1973 and the Kresnik Award for best novel in 1991 and 2004. In addition to his opus of adult fiction, he also published a number of books for children and young readers. He died in Ljubljana in 2004.

== List of works ==
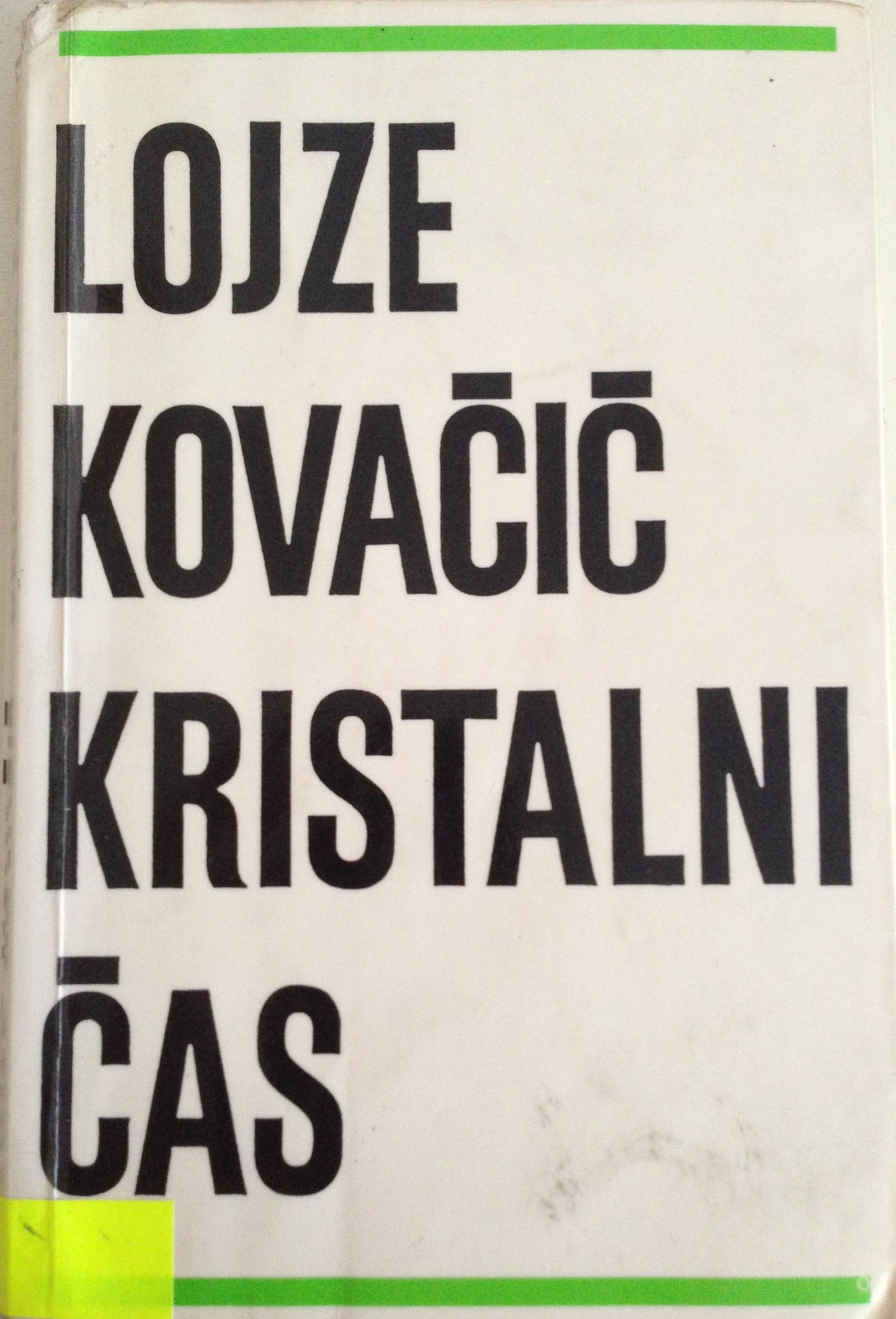
Kristalni čas, Crystal Time, novel (1990)

Adult fiction

- Ljubljanske razglednice, Postcards from Ljubljana, short stories (1956)
- Ključi mesta, Keys to the City, short stories (1967)
- Deček in smrt, A Boy and Death, novel (1968)
- Sporočila v spanju – Resničnost, Messages in Dreams: Reality (1972)
- Pet fragmentov, Five Fragments (1981)
- Prišleki: Pripoved (Del 1-2) (1984)
  - Newcomers: Book One, trans. Michael Biggins (Archipelago Books, 2016)
  - Newcomers: Book Two, trans. Michael Biggins (Archipelago Books, 2020)
- Prišleki: Pripoved (Del 3) (1985)
  - Newcomers: Book Three, trans. Michael Biggins (Archipelago Books, 2027)
- Basel (1986)
- Prah, Dust, novel (1988)
- Kristalni čas, Crystal Time, novel (1990)
- Zgodbe s panjskih končnic, Stories from Beehive Front-Boards (1992)
- Vzemljohod, The Descent (1993)
- Književna delavnica – šola pisanja, The Workshop: A School of Writing (1997)
- Otroške stvari, Things of Childhood, novel (2003)
- Zrele reči, Things of Maturity, novel (published posthumously 2009)

Juvenile literature

- Novoletna zgodba, A New Year's Tale (1958)
- Zgodbe iz mesta Rič-Rač, Tales from the Town of Rič-Rač (1962)
- Fantek na oblaku, A Boy on a Cloud (1969)
- Potovanje za nosom, Following your Nose (1972)
- Možiček med dimniki, A Man among the Chimneys (1974)
- Najmočnejši fantek na svetu, The Strongest Boy in the World (1977)
- Dva zmerjalca, A Pair of Scolders (1979)
- Rdeča kapica, Little Red Riding Hood (1979)
- Zgodba o levih in levčku, The Tale of the Lions and the Lion Cub (1983)
- Zgodbe iz mesta Rič-Rač in od drugod, Tales from the Town of Rič-Rač and Elsewhere (1994)
