= Suzana Tratnik =

Slovenian writer, translator, activist and sociologist

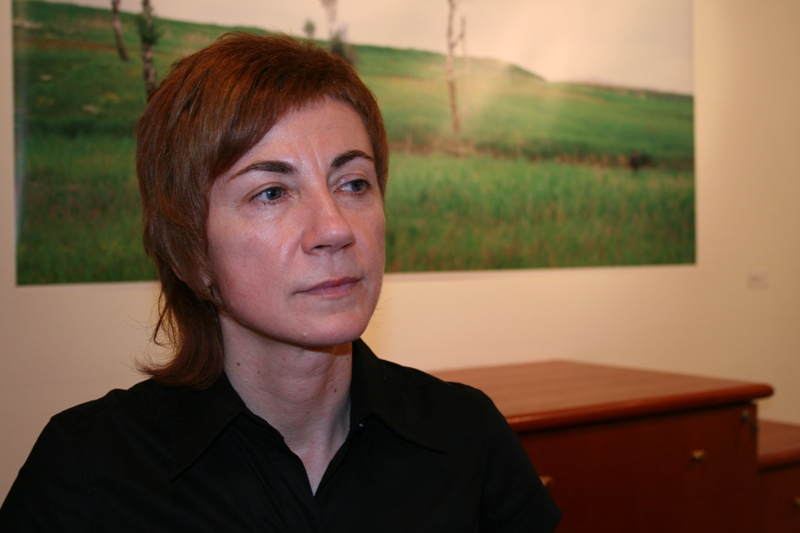
- Born: 1963 (age 62–63); Murska Sobota, Slovenia
- Education: University of Ljubljana
- Occupations: Writer, Activist
- Writing career
- Genres: Novel, short stories, radio drama, essays
- Notable works: Tretji svet (Third World), 2007
- Notable awards: Prešeren Foundation Award

Suzana Tratnik is a Slovenian writer, translator, activist, and sociologist. She has published seven short-story collections, four novels, a play, a children’s picture book, two works of nonfiction, and an essay collection. Her books and short stories have been translated into more than twenty languages while Tratnik herself has translated several English books into Slovene, including works from authors such as Jackie Kay, Leslie Feinberg, Judith Butler, Adrienne Rich, Ian McEwan, and Truman Capote.

In 2007 Tratnik was awarded the Prešeren Foundation Prize, one of Slovenia’s most prestigious literary awards. Her most recent work, Games with Greta and Other Stories, is forthcoming in translation from Dalkey Archive Press.

== Life ==
Suzana Tratnik was born in 1963 in Murska Sobota, in Slovenia. She obtained her BA in sociology from the Faculty of Social Sciences at the University of Ljubljana, and her MA in gender anthropology from the Institutum Studiorum Humanitatis in Ljubljana, where she lives and works. Tratnik was deeply involved in the 1980s LGBT-rights movement in Yugoslavia and much of work continues to focus upon LGBT activism and scholarship in contemporary Slovenia.

== Works ==
Short Stories

- Pod ničlo (Below Zero, 1997)
- Na svojem dvorišču (In One’s Own Backyard, 2003)
- Vzporednice (Parallels, 2005)
- Česa nisem nikoli razumela na vlaku (Things I’ve Never Understood on the Train, 2008)
- Dva svetova (Two Worlds, 2010)
- Rezervat (Reservation, 2012)
- Games with Greta and Other Stories (2016. Dalkey Archive Press)

Novels

- Ime mi je Damjan (My Name is Damjan, 2001)
- Tretji svet (Third World, 2007)

Children's

- Zafuškana Ganca (The Hany Rattie, 2010)

Drama

- Ime mi je Damjan (My Name is Damjan, 2002)
- Lep dan še naprej (Have a Nice Day, 2012)

== Books of Suzana Tratnik in translation ==
Short Stories

- Ninguna voz. Ediciones Arlequín. 2017.
