= Šafarsko =

- Location in Slovenia
- Coordinates: 46°31′5.59″N 16°17′17.5″E
- Country: Slovenia
- Traditional region: Međimurje, Zala County
- Statistical region: Mura
- Municipality: Razkrižje

Area
  - Total: 1.87 km^{2} (0.72 sq mi)
- Elevation: 190.7 m (626 ft)

Population (2002)
  - Total: 141

Šafarsko (pronounced [ˈʃaːfaɾskɔ]; Hungarian: Ligetfalva) is a village on the right bank of the Ščavnica River in the Municipality of Razkrižje in eastern Slovenia, next to the border with Croatia. The area traditionally belonged to Zala County in the Kingdom of Hungary and is now included in the Mura Statistical Region.

The Slovene writer Vlado Žabot was born in the village in 1958.
