= Vlado Žabot =

Slovene writer and journalist

- Born: 11 August 1958 (age 68); Šafarsko, Socialist Federal Republic of Yugoslavia (now in Slovenia)
- Occupations: Writer, journalist
- Writing career
- Notable works: Volčje noči, Sukub
- Notable awards: Kresnik Award; 1997 Volčje noči

Vlado Žabot (born 11 August 1958) is a Slovene writer and journalist. He was president of the Slovene Writers' Association for two terms between 2003 and 2007.

Žabot was born in Šafarsko in eastern Slovenia in 1958. He completed his studies in comparative literature at the University of Ljubljana in 1986 and worked for the Delo newspaper from 1987.

He won the Prešeren Foundation Award in 1996 for his novel Pastorala and the Kresnik Award for his novel Volčje noči in 1997.

== Selected works ==
- Bukovska mati, short stories (1986)
- Stari pil, novel, (1989)
- Pikec in Puhec iščeta Mihca, children's book, (1990)
- Pastorala, novel, (1994)
- Skrivnost močvirja Vilindol, children's book, (1994)
- Volčje noči, novel, (1996)
- Nimfa, novel, (1999)
- Sukub, novel, (2003)
- Ljudstvo lunja, novel (2010)
- Sveta poroka, epic poem about ancient Slavic myth, (2012)
