= Štefan Kardoš =

Slovene writer (born 1966)

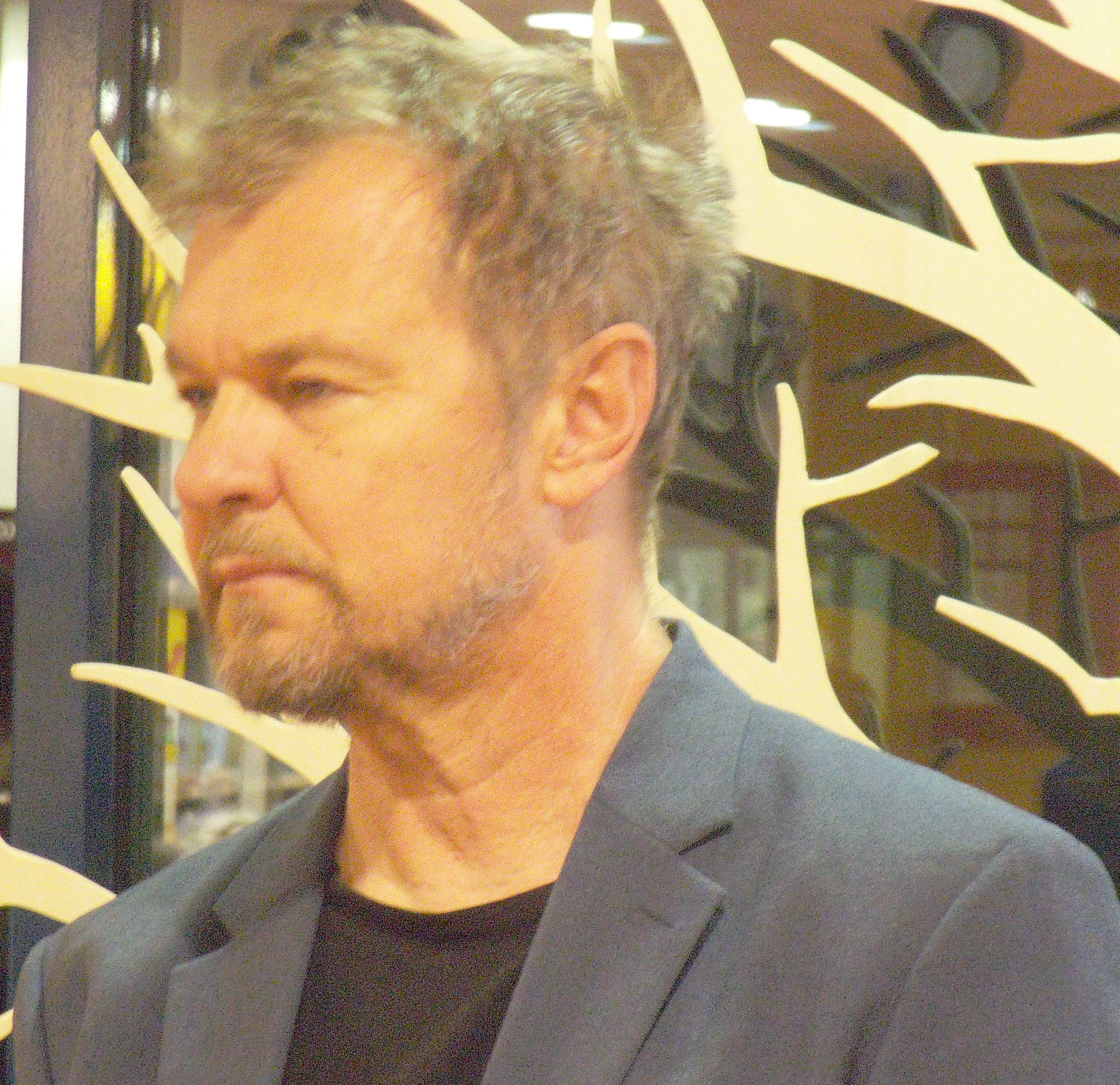
- Štefan Kardoš (1966-), Slovene writer, poet and editor from Prekmurje in Murska Sobota Regional Library (2024)
- Born: 1966 (age 59–60)
- Occupations: Writer, teacher
- Writing career
- Notable work: Rizling polka
- Notable awards: Kresnik Award; 2007 Rizling polka

Štefan Kardoš (born 1966) is a Slovene writer. He lives in Murska Sobota and works as a teacher at the Bilingual Secondary School in Lendava.

In 2008 Kardoš won the Kresnik Award for his novel Rizling polka (Riesling Polka).

== Novels ==
- Sekstant (2002), co-written with Robert Titan Felix and Norma Bale
- Rizling polka (2007)
- Pobočje sončnega griča (2010)
