= Dušan Šarotar =

Slovenian writer, essayist, literary critic and editor

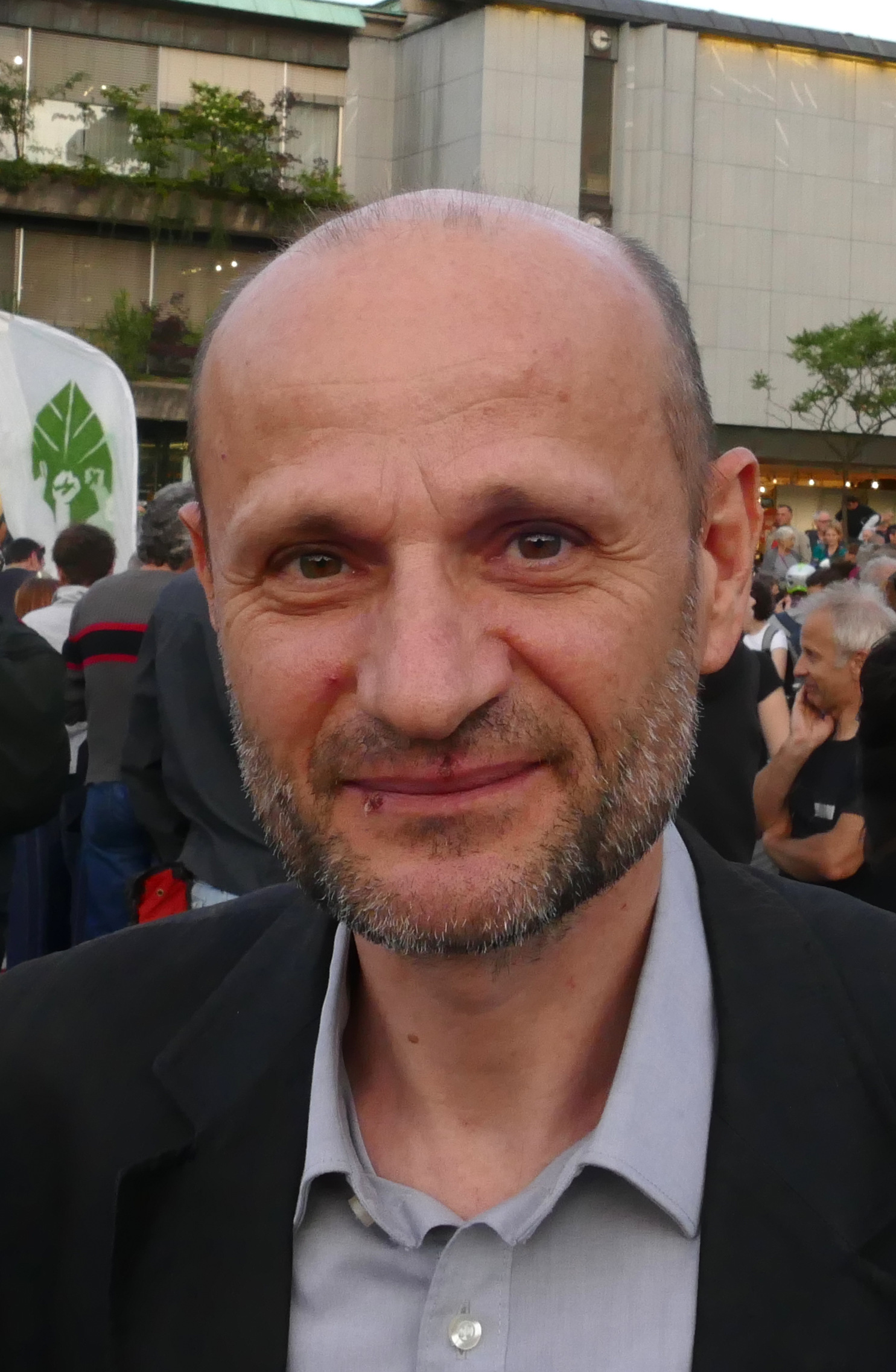
- Born: 16 April 1968; Murska Sobota, Slovenia
- Occupations: Writer, poet
- Writing career
- Notable work: Billiards at the Hotel Dobray

Dušan Šarotar (born 16 April 1968) is a Slovenian writer, essayist, literary critic and editor.

He was born in the town of Murska Sobota in northeastern Slovenia. He studied sociology and philosophy at the University of Ljubljana. He has published several essays and columns in renowned Slovenian journals, such as Mladina, Nova revija, and Sodobnost. His best known novel is Billiards at the Hotel Dobray (Bilijard v Dobrayu), an account of the persecution of Jews in Murska Sobota at the end of the Second World War from the perspective of a Holocaust survivor returning from a concentration camp. The novel, first published in Slovene in 2007, is based on the story of Šarotar's grandfather. In 2022 he was nominated for the annual Cankar Award.

== Bibliography ==
Prose

- Potapljanje na dah, The Island of the Dead, novel (1999)
- Mrtvi kot, The Blind Spot, short stories (2000)
- Nočitev z zajtrkom, Bed and Breakfast, novel (2003)
- Biljard v Dobrayu, Billiards at the Hotel Dobray, novel (2007)
- Nostalgija, Nostalgia, short stories (2010)
- Ostani z mano, duša moja – Ostani z menov, düša moja, Stay With Me My Soul, novel (2011)
- Panorama, novel (2014)

Prose Translated into English

- Panorama, Istros Books, London, 2016.
- Billiards at the Hotel Dobray, Istros Books, London, 2019.

Prose Translated into Spanish

- Panorama, Ediciones Arlequín, Zapopan, 2017.
- , El billar en el hotel Dobray Eduvim, Villa María, 2019.

Poetry

- Občutek za veter, poems (co-author Feri Lainšček) (2004)
- Krajina v molu, poems (2006)
- Hiša mojega sina, poems (2008)
