= Veronika Simoniti =

Slovenian writer (born 1967)

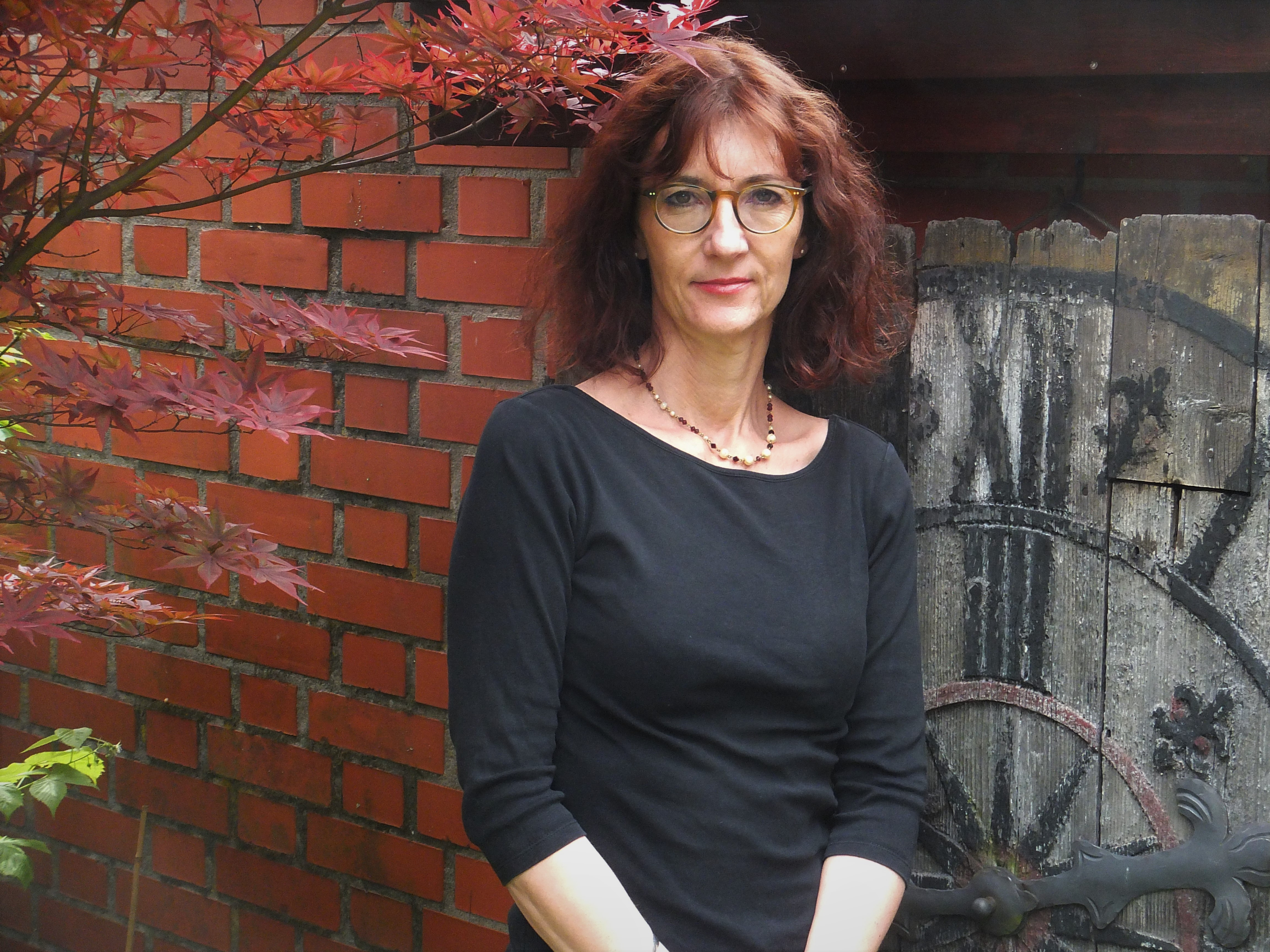
Veronika Simoniti

Veronika Simoniti (born 1967) is a Slovenian writer. She studied Italian and French Studies at university, which led her to work for several years as a freelance translator. She started writing scripts and stories at Radio Slovenia. Her first published story “Metuljev zaliv” (Butterfly Bay; 2000) won first prize in a Literatura magazine competition. Her debut collection of stories was titled Zasukane štorije (Twisted Stories; 2005). It was nominated as best debut of the year in 2006, and it also won Dnevnik newspaper's 2007 Fabula Award.

Simoniti's second collection Hudičev jezik (The Devil's Tongue; LUD Literatura) appeared in 2011, followed by the novel Kameno seme (Stony Seed; Založba Litera) in 2014. Kameno seme was nominated for the Kresnik Award for the best Slovenian novel of the year. Her work has appeared in several anthologies: Delo newspaper's “Summer Stories” collections for 2006 and 2012; the English-language collection of Slovenian short stories A Lazy Sunday Afternoon (Litteræ Slovenicæ, DSP, 2007) and another anthology of Slovenian authors Kliči me po imenu (Call Me by Name; Študentska založba, 2013). Her work has also been translated in numerous European languages.

Simoniti won the 2020 Kresnik Prize for her novel Ivana Before the Sea.
