= Anja Mugerli =

Slovenian writer

Anja Mugerli (born 1984) is a Slovenian writer. She studied at the University of Nova Gorica and the University of Primorska. She has published several books. She is also an award-winning playwright. Besides Slovene, Mugerli is fluent in English, Spanish and Italian. She lives in Nova Gorica. In 2024 she was nominated for Cankar Award.

== Selected works ==
- Zeleni fotelj (Green Armchair), 2015
- Spovin, 2017, novel - nominated for the Slovenian Novel of the Year Award
- Čebelja Družina (Bee Family), short stories

== Awards ==
She won the EU Prize for Literature for Cebelja Druzina.
