= Prikrita harmonija =

2001 novel by Katarina Marinčič

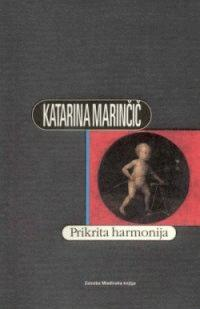
- Author: Katarina Marinčič
- Language: Slovenian
- Publication place: Slovenia

Prikrita harmonija is a novel by Slovenian author Katarina Marinčič. It was first published in 2001.

== See also ==
- List of Slovenian novels
