= Samira Kentrić =

Slovenian visual artist and illustrator

Samira Kentrić (born 1976) is a Slovenian visual artist and illustrator. She specializes in political commentary and has published two acclaimed graphic novels: Balkanalia (Balkanalije, 2015) and Letter to Adna (Pismo Adni, 2016).
