= Goran Vojnović =

Slovenian writer, screenwriter and film director

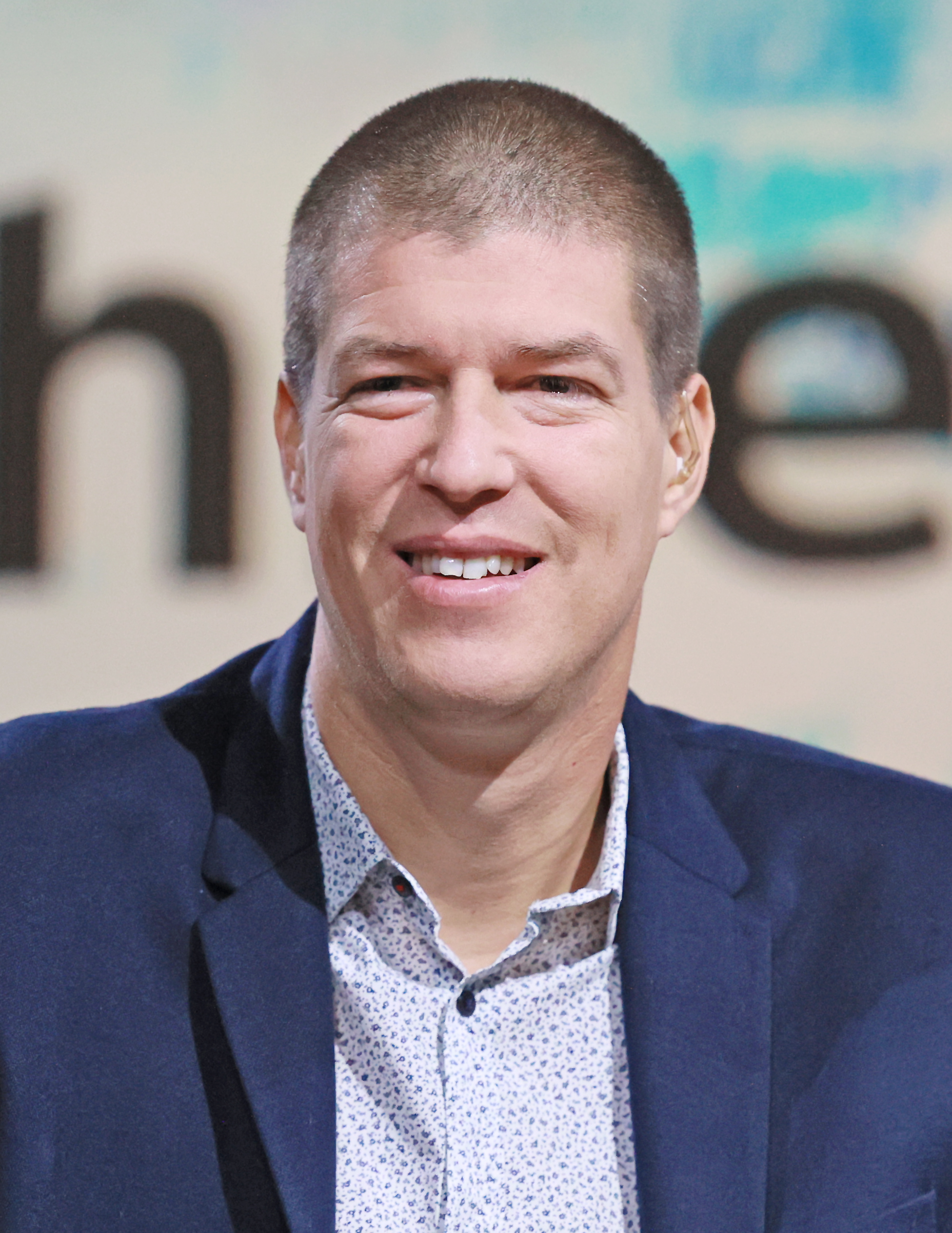
- Goran Vojnović (2023)
- Born: 11 June 1980 (age 46); Ljubljana, SFR Yugoslavia
- Occupations: Writer, screenwriter, film director
- Writing career
- Notable works: Čefurji raus!, Jugoslavija moja dežela, Figa
- Notable awards: Prešeren Foundation Award; 2009 for Čefurji raus! Kresnik Award; 2009 for Čefurji raus! Angelus Award; 2020 for Jugoslavija, moja dežela

Goran Vojnović (born 11 June 1980) is a Slovenian writer, screenwriter and film director. He is best known for his 2008 novel Southern Scum Go Home (Slovene: Čefurji raus!) which won him numerous awards as well as a lawsuit filed by the Slovenian Police that was withdrawn a day later after media attention and public outrage at police filing charges for a work of fiction brought embarrassment to the Slovenian Ministry of Interior.

Vojnović was born in Ljubljana. He studied at the Academy for Theatre, Radio, Film and Television. He published his first collection of poetry Lep je ta svet in 1998. His novel Čefurji raus! started out as an unfinished film script. It describes life of immigrant youth in the Fužine estate in Ljubljana, their everyday problems and cultural differences between locals and immigrants from the former Yugoslavia. For it he won the Prešeren Foundation Award and the Kresnik Award in 2009. It has been translated and published in many languages.

His novel Jugoslavija, moja dežela (Yugoslavia, My Fatherland) was published in 2011 by Beletrina. The English translation was published in 2015 by Istros Books in the UK. His third novel Figa (The Fig Tree) was translated into English by Istros Books in 2020.

== Published works ==
- Čefurji raus! (Southern Scum Go Home!), novel (2008)
- Jugoslavija, moja dežela (Yugoslavia, My Fatherland), novel (2013)
- Figa (The Fig Tree ), novel (2016)
- Đorđić se vrača, novel (2021)
- Zbiralec strahov, essays (2022)

== Works Translated into English ==
- Yugoslavia, My Fatherland (Istros Books, London, 2015)
- The Fig Tree (Istros Books, London, 2020)
