= Ljubljana Student Organisation =

The Student Organisation of the University of Ljubljana (ŠOU of Ljubljana) is a student organization based in Ljubljana, Slovenia. It is the largest student organization in Slovenia and one of the largest in Europe. Its representative body is elected by all students of the University of Ljubljana. The organization's aim is to promote high-quality education, and the quality of student life.

It was founded in 1990 by the Student Organisations Establishment Act and is registered with the Student Organisation of Slovenia (ŠOS). The basic instrument governing the operations of ŠOU Ljubljana as a legal entity or private law is the Law on the community of students and the student constitution.

On 15 May 1990, student members at the first meeting of the Student Parliament adopted the Act establishing the ŠOU of Ljubljana, on 27 November 1990 first Student Constitution was drawn up, which established the organisation and functions of the ŠOU of Ljubljana. On 20 June 1994, the National Assembly of the Republic of Slovenia adopted the Act on the community of students (Official Gazette of the Republic. 38/94), which regulates the position, functions and activities of student's self-governing communities in Slovenia. The basic act of the self-managing community of students of Slovenia, the Student Constitution, was adopted in 1997 (Official Gazette of the Republic. 67/97) and a revised version in 2002.
