= Jernej Županič =

Slovenian author and translator (born 1982)

Jernej Županič (born 1982) is a Slovenian author and translator.

== Biography ==
Županič was born in 1982 in Ljubljana, Slovenia. He studied philosophy and comparative literature at university.

Županič has written a collection of poems, titled Tatar, as well as two novels, Mamuti and Behemot.

Županič also has translated into Slovenian work of English-language writers including Jonathan Franzen, David Foster Wallace, Taiye Selasi, Dave Eggers, Lydia Davis, and C.D. Wright. He has won the Radojka Vrančič Award for his translations.

== Works ==
- Tatar (in Slovenian). LUD Literatura. 2016.
- Mamuti [Mammoths] (in Slovenian). LUD Literatura. 2018.
- Behemot [Behemoth] (in Slovenian). Beletrina. 2019.
