= Bronja Žakelj =

Slovenian writer

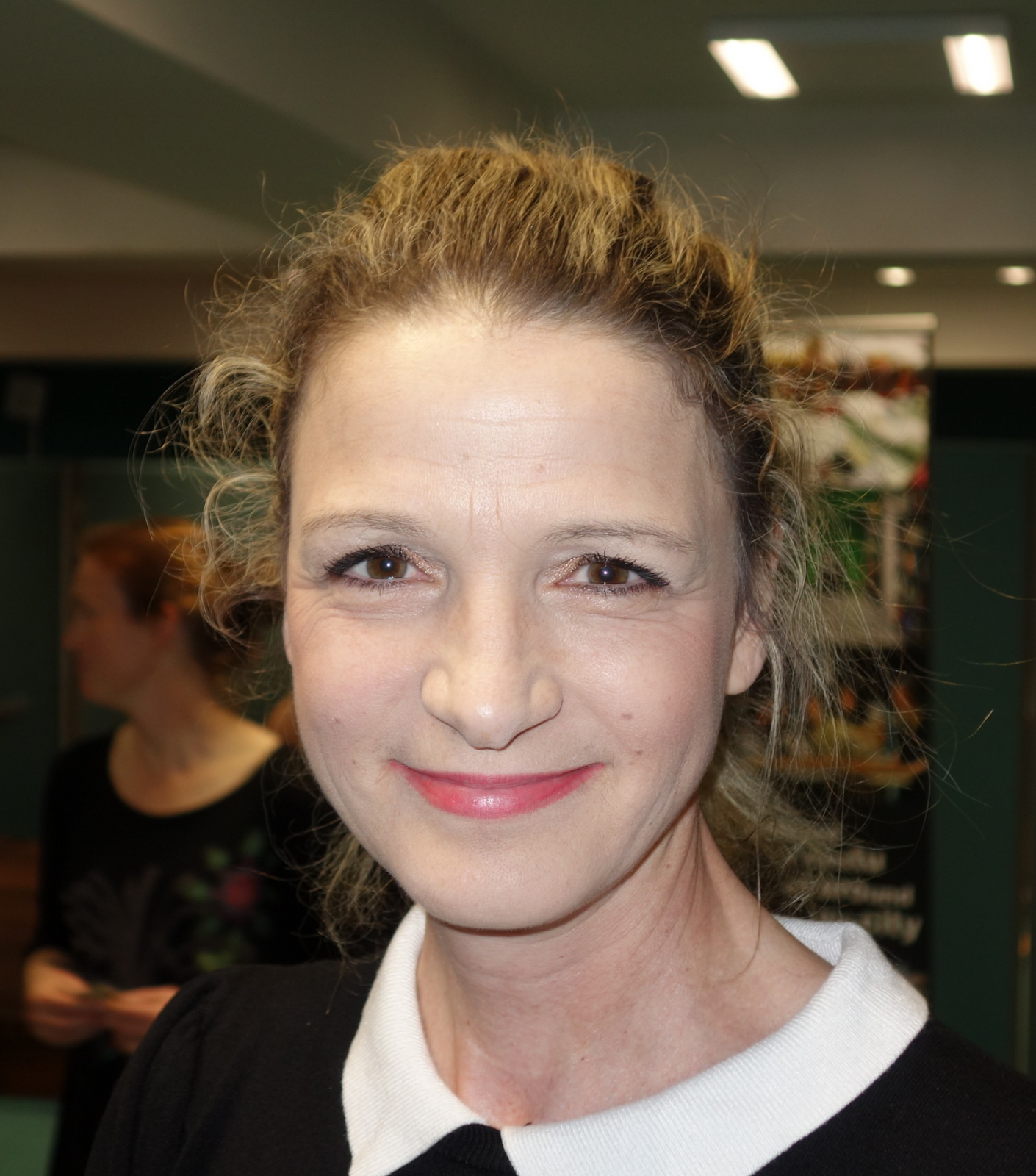
- Bronja Žakelj, April 2019
- Born: 1969 (age 56–57)
- Occupation: Writer

Bronja Žakelj (born 1969) is a Slovenian writer. Trained in journalism, she currently works in finance. Her debut novel Belo se pere na devetdeset appeared in 2018, and received critical and popular acclaim. The novel is autobiographical, and deals with growing up in Yugoslavia in the 1970s and 1980s. In 2019, Zakelj's book won the 29th Kresnik Award, only the third time a female author has won this prize.
