= Kresnik Award =

Slovenian literary award

- Description: Awarded each year for the best novel in Slovene of the previous year
- Country: Slovenia
- Presented by: Delo

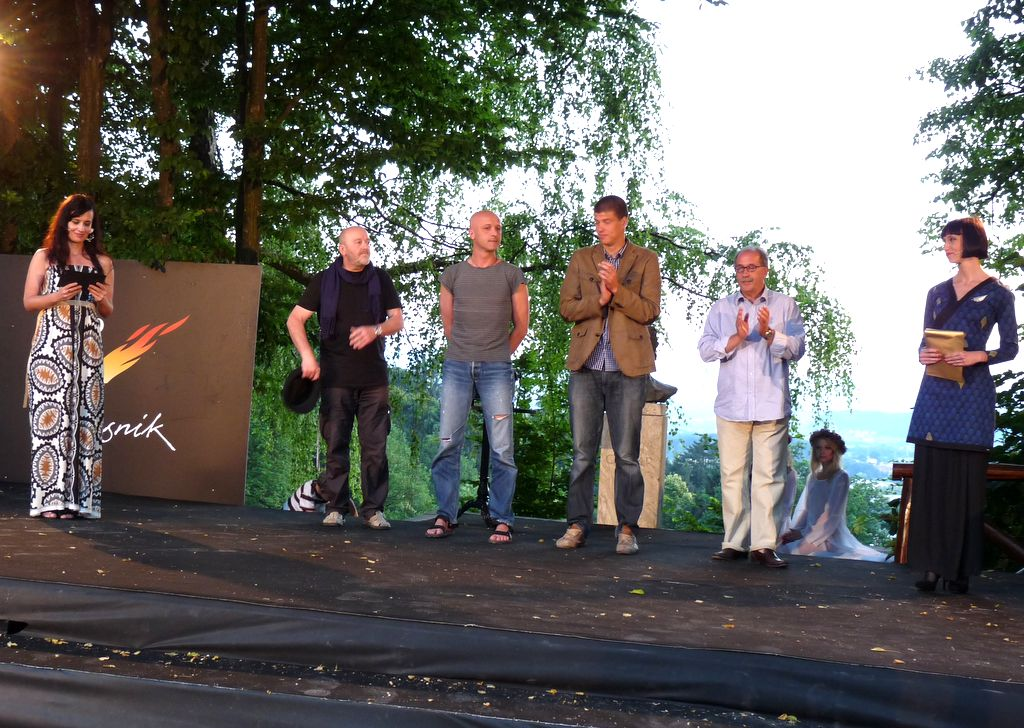
2013 Kresnik Award

Kresnik is a literary award in Slovenia awarded each year for the best novel in Slovene of the previous year. It has been bestowed since 1991 at summer solstice by the national newspaper house Delo. The awards ceremony is normally held on Rožnik Hill above Ljubljana where the winner is invited to light a large bonfire. The winner also receives a financial award.

== Winners ==
Year	Author	Novel	Title in English	Publisher
1991	Lojze Kovačič	Kristalni čas	Crystal Time	DZS
1992	Feri Lainšček	Namesto koga roža cveti	Instead of Whom does the Flower Bloom	Prešernova družba
1993	Miloš Mikeln	Veliki voz	The Great Bear	Mihelač
1994	Andrej Hieng	Čudežni Feliks	The Miraculous Felix	Mladinska knjiga
1995	Tone Perčič	Izganjalec hudiča	The Exorcist	Cankarjeva založba
1996	Berta Bojetu	Ptičja hiša	The Birdhouse	Wieser
1997	Vlado Žabot	Volčje noči	Wolf Nights	Pomurska založba
1998	Zoran Hočevar	Šolen z Brega	Šolen from Breg	Založba /*cf
1999	Drago Jančar	Zvenenje v glavi	Ringing in the Head	Mladinska knjiga
2000	Andrej E. Skubic	Grenki med	Bitter Honey	DZS
2001	Drago Jančar	Katarina, pav in jezuit	Katarina, the Peacock and the Jesuit	Slovenska matica
2002	Katarina Marinčič	Prikrita harmonija	Hidden Harmony	Mladinska knjiga
2003	Rudi Šeligo	Izgubljeni sveženj	Lost Package	Nova revija
2004	Lojze Kovačič	Otroške stvari	Childhood Things	Beletrina
2005	Alojz Rebula	Nokturno za Primorsko	A Nocturne for Primorska	Mohorjeva Celje/Trst
2006	Milan Dekleva	Zmagoslavje podgan	The Triumph of the Rats	Cankarjeva založba
2007	Feri Lainšček	Muriša	Muriša	Beletrina
2008	Štefan Kardoš	Rizling polka	Riesling Polka	Litera
2009	Goran Vojnović	Čefurji raus!	Southern Scum Go Home!	Beletrina
2010	Tadej Golob	Svinjske nogice	Pigs' Legs	Litera
2011	Drago Jančar	To noč sem jo videl	I Saw Her That Night	Modrijan
2012	Andrej E. Skubic	Koliko si moja?	How Much Are You Mine?	Beletrina
2013	Goran Vojnović	Jugoslavija moja dežela!	Yugoslavia, My Fatherland	Beletrina
2014	Davorin Lenko	Telesa v temi	Bodies in the Dark	Center za slovensko književnost
2015	Andrej E. Skubic	Samo pridi domov	Just Come Home	Modrijan
2016	Miha Mazzini	Otroštvo	Childhood	Goga
2017	Goran Vojnović	Figa	The Fig Tree	Beletrina
2018	Drago Jančar	In ljubezen tudi	And Love As well	Beletrina
2019	Bronja Žakelj	Belo se pere na devetdeset	Whites Wash at Ninety	Beletrina
2020	Veronika Simoniti	Ivana pred morjem	Ivana in Front of the Sea	Cankarjeva založba
2021	Borut Kraševec	Agni	Agni	Mladinska knjiga
2022	Roman Rozina	Sto let slepote	One Hundred Years of Blindness	Mladinska knjiga
2023	Lado Kralj	Ne bom se več drsal na bajerju	I Will No Longer Skate on the Pond	Beletrina
2024	Anja Mugerli	Pričakovanja	Expectations	Cankarjeva založba
2025	Ana Schnabl	September	September	Beletrina
