= University of Ljubljana =

Public university in Slovenia

- Univerza v Ljubljani
- Latin: Universitas Labacensis
- Type: Public
- Established: 1919; 107 years ago
- Affiliations: Guild of European Research-Intensive Universities; Utrecht Network; UNICA
- Rector: Gregor Majdič
- Administrative staff: cca 3,500
- Students: 37,615
- Location: Ljubljana and Portorož, Slovenia; 46°02′56″N 14°30′14″E
- Website: www.uni-lj.si Building details
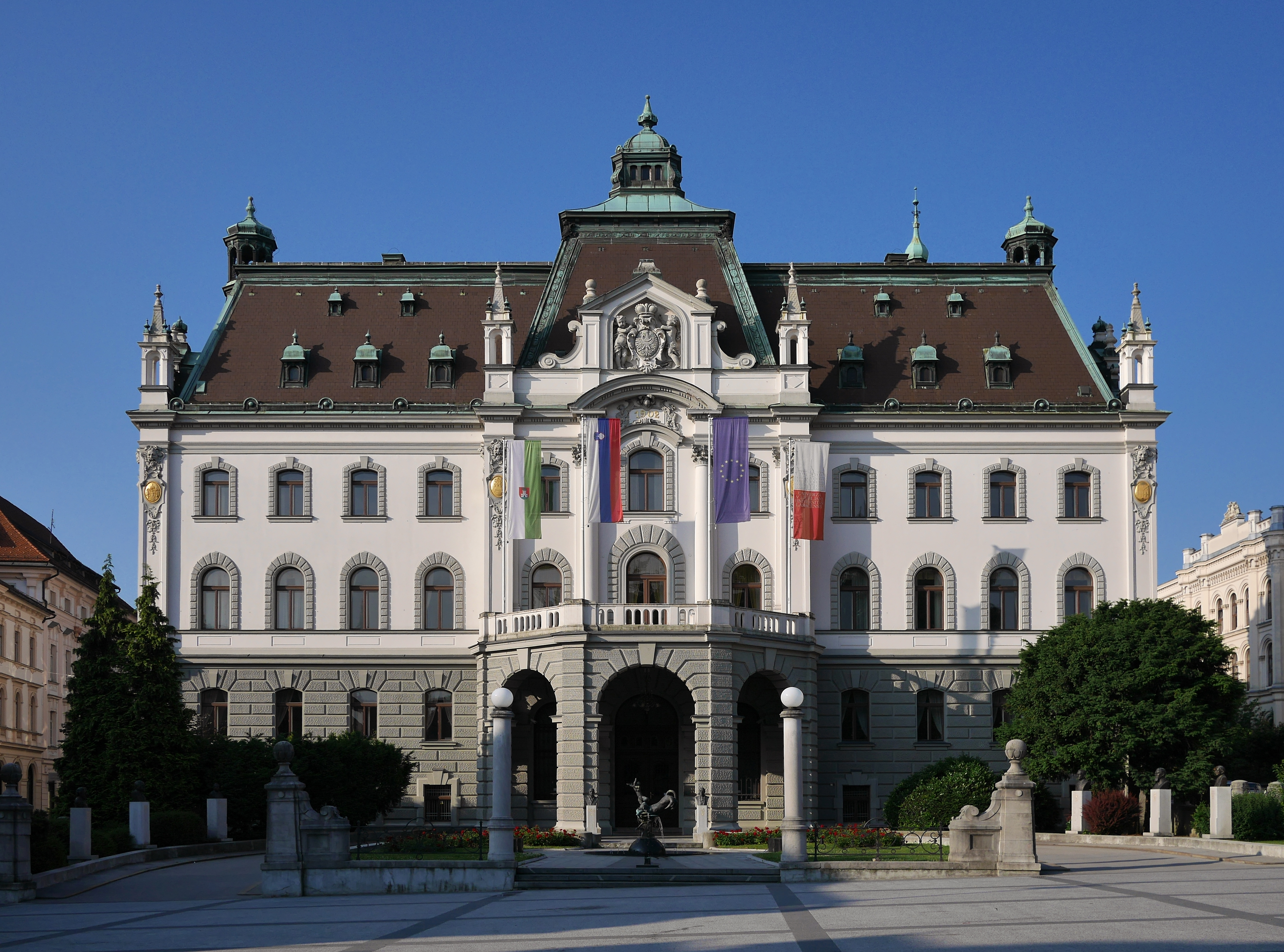
- Main building of the University at 5 Congress Square, June 2015

University rankings

Global – Overall
- ARWU World: 601–700 (2023)
- QS World: =535 (2026)
- THE World: 801–1000 (2024)
- USNWR Global: =450 (2023)

Regional – Overall
- QS Emerging Europe and Central Asia: 33 (2022)

The University of Ljubljana (Slovene: Univerza v Ljubljani, pronounced [uniʋɛ́ːɾza w ljubljàːni], Latin: Universitas Labacensis), abbreviated UL, is the oldest and largest university in Slovenia. It has approximately 38,000 enrolled students. The university has 23 faculties and three art academies with approximately 4,000 teaching and research staff, assisted by approximately 2,000 technical and administrative staff. The University of Ljubljana offers programs in the humanities, sciences, and technology, as well as in medicine, dentistry, and veterinary science.

The university was founded in the centre of Ljubljana, where the central university building and the majority of its faculties are located. Since then, newer buildings have been constructed in the suburbs of the city.

== History ==
=== Beginnings ===
Although certain academies (notably of philosophy and theology) were established as Jesuit higher education in what is now Slovenia as early as the seventeenth century, the first university was founded in 1810 under the Écoles centrales of the French imperial administration of the Illyrian provinces. The chancellor of the university in Ljubljana during the French period was Joseph Walland (a.k.a. Jožef Balant, 1763–1834), born in Upper Carniola. That university was disbanded in 1813, when Austria regained territorial control and reestablished the Imperial Royal Lyceum of Ljubljana as a higher-education institution.

=== Quest for a national university ===
During the second half of the 19th century, several political claims for the establishment of a Slovene-language university in Ljubljana were made. They gained momentum in the fin de siècle era, when a considerable number of renowned Slovene academians worked throughout Central Europe, while ever more numerous Slovenian students were enrolled in foreign-language universities of the Austro-Hungarian Empire, particularly in the Austrian and Czech lands. Notable examples are the Charles University in Prague and the University of Olomouc, the latter of which Slovene philosopher Franc Samuel Karpe became the chancellor of in 1781. In the 1890s, a unified board for the establishment of a Slovenian university was founded, with Ivan Hribar, Henrik Tuma, and Aleš Ušeničnik as its main leaders. In 1898, the Carniolan regional parliament established a scholarship for all students who were planning a habilitation under the condition that they would accept a post at Ljubljana University when founded. In this way, a list of suitable members of faculty started to emerge.

Nevertheless, unfavorable political circumstances prevented the establishment of the university until the fall of the Austro-Hungarian Empire. With the establishment of the short-lived State of Slovenes, Croats and Serbs and the Kingdom of Serbs, Croats and Slovenes (Kingdom of Yugoslavia) in 1918, the founding of the university became possible. On November 23, 1918, the first meeting of the Founding Board of Ljubljana University was called, presided over by Mihajlo Rostohar, professor of psychology at the Charles University in Prague. Together with Danilo Majaron, Rostohar convinced the central government of the Kingdom of Serbs, Croats and Slovenes in Belgrade to pass a bill formally establishing the university. The bill was passed on July 2, 1919; in late August, the first professors were appointed, and on September 18, the full professors established the University Council, thus starting the normal functioning of the institution. The first lectures started on December 3 of the same year.

=== First decades ===
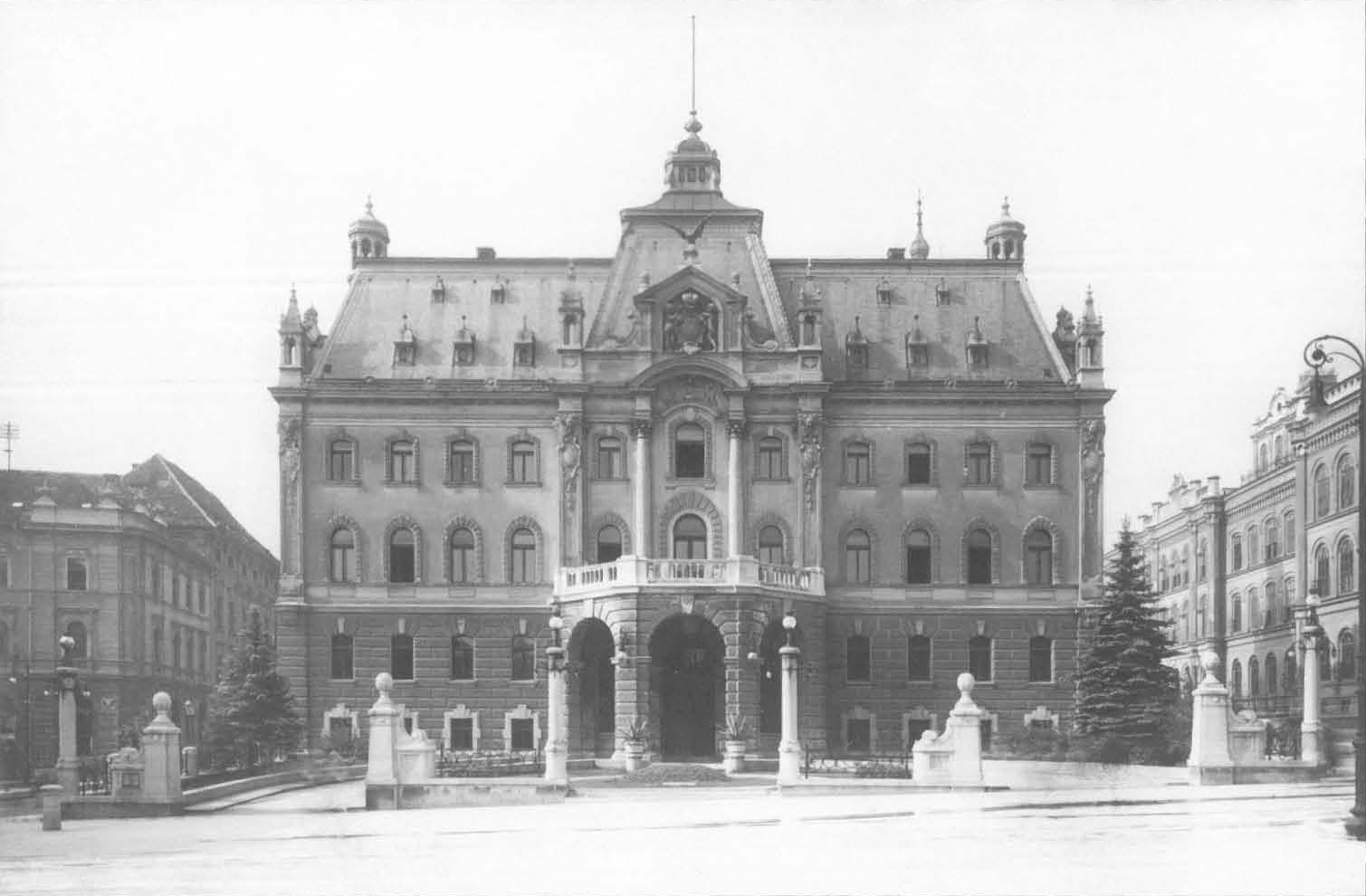
University administrative building in 1929

In 1919, the university comprised five faculties: law, philosophy, technology, theology and medicine. The seat of the university was in the central Congress Square of Ljubljana in a building that had served as the State Mansion of Carniola from 1902 to 1918. The building was first designed in 1902 by Jan Vladimír Hráský, and was later remodelled by a Czech architect from Vienna, Josip Hudetz.

In the mid-1920s, the university was renamed the "King Alexander University in Ljubljana" (Universitas Alexandrina Labacensis) and continued to grow despite financial troubles and constant pressure from Yugoslav governments’ centralist policies. In 1941, Jože Plečnik's National and University Library was completed, as one of the major infrastructure projects of the university in the interwar period.

After the invasion of Yugoslavia in April 1941, the university continued to function under the Italian and Nazi German occupation, despite numerous problems and interference in its autonomous operation. Several professors were arrested or deported to Nazi concentration camps and large numbers of students joined either the Liberation Front of the Slovenian People or the Slovenian Home Guard.

=== 1945 and later ===
Following the end of the Second World War, the first and only foreigner elected to hold the office of chancellor was the Czech professor Alois Král, who had lectured at Faculty of Technical Sciences since 1920 and also held the position of dean thereof four times. After the establishment of Communist Yugoslavia in 1945, the university was again put under political pressure: numerous professors were dismissed, some were arrested and tried, and the theological faculty was excluded from the university. Some of the most brilliant students emigrated. Nevertheless, the university maintained its educational role and regained a limited degree of autonomy from the mid-1950s onward. It suffered a serious setback in autonomy from the mid-1970s to the early 1980s, when some professors were again dismissed by the authorities. In 1979 it was renamed "Edvard Kardelj University in Ljubljana" after the Communist leader. In 1990, with the fall of Yugoslavia, it was regiven its original name.

== Organization ==
=== Faculties and academies ===
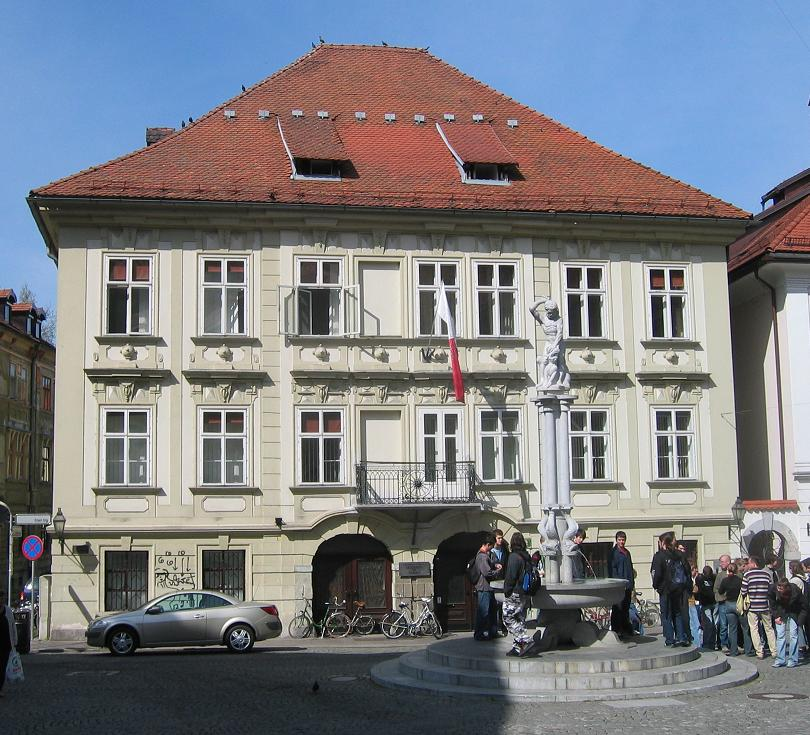
Academy of Music

As of 2018, the university has 23 faculties and three academies, situated throughout urban Ljubljana:

- Academy of Theatre, Radio, Film and Television
- Academy of Fine Arts and Design
- Academy of Music
- Faculty of Administration
- Faculty of Architecture
- Faculty of Arts
- Biotechnical Faculty
- Faculty of Chemistry and Chemical Technology
- Faculty of Civil Engineering and Geodesy
- Faculty of Computer and Information Science
- Faculty of Economics
- Faculty of Education
- Faculty of Electrical Engineering
- Faculty of Law
- Faculty of Maritime Studies and Transport
- Faculty of Mathematics and Physics
- Faculty of Mechanical Engineering
- Faculty of Medicine
- Faculty of Natural Sciences and Engineering
- Faculty of Pharmacy
- Faculty of Social Sciences
- Faculty of Social work
- Faculty of Sport
- Faculty of Theology
- Veterinary Faculty
- Faculty of Health Sciences

The university was initially located in the centre of Ljubljana where the central university building and the majority of its faculties are located. Later on, some new, modern buildings and a small scale campus were constructed in other parts of the city (Bežigrad, Vič, Brdo).

=== Libraries ===
The University of Ljubljana has two university libraries. The National and University Library of Slovenia is the national library of Slovenia and the university library of the University of Ljubljana. It contains about 1,307,000 books and numerous text, visual and multimedia resources.

Another university library is the Central Technological Library, which is also the national library and information hub of natural sciences and technology. There are over 30 libraries at individual faculties, departments, and institutes of the University of Ljubljana. The largest among them are the Central Humanist Library in the field of humanities, the Central Economic Library in the field of economics, the Central Medical Library in the field of medical sciences, and the Libraries of the Biotechnical Faculty in the field of biology and biotechnology.

=== Gallery ===
The university operates an art gallery, open since 18 June 2012.

== Academics ==
The University of Ljubljana practices research in science and the arts, such as the humanities, social sciences, linguistics, arts, medicine, natural sciences and technology.

The University of Ljubljana used to house the permanent seat of the International Association for Political Science Students (IAPSS), an international academic group consisting of 10,000 political science graduate and undergraduate students worldwide from 2004 to 2013. In March 2013 the Permanent Seat was relocated to Nijmegen (Netherlands).

The University of Ljubljana was ranked 601-650 in QS World University Rankings 2023.

== Notable people ==
- Slavoj Žižek - Slovenian psychoanalytic philosopher, cultural critic, and Hegelian Marxist. He attended Ljubljana and attained a Master of Arts in philosophy in 1975, and is a senior researcher at the Institute for Sociology and Philosophy at the University of Ljubljana.
- Marko Bošnjak (judge) - (born 12 March 1974) is a Slovenian jurist, judge of the European Court of Human Rights, attorney and academic.
- Matjaž Gams - Editor in chief for Informatica. Member of Slovenian Academy of Engineering and European Academy of Sciences and Arts
- Nina Betetto - lawyer and judge
- Nataša Govekar - Theologician and Director of the Theological-Pastoral Department at the Dicastery for Communication of the Holy See

== See also ==
- List of modern universities in Europe (1801–1945)
- Slovenian Academy of Sciences and Arts
- Jožef Stefan Institute
- Ljubljana Student Organisation
