= Lovćen Brigade =

- Ловћенска Бригада
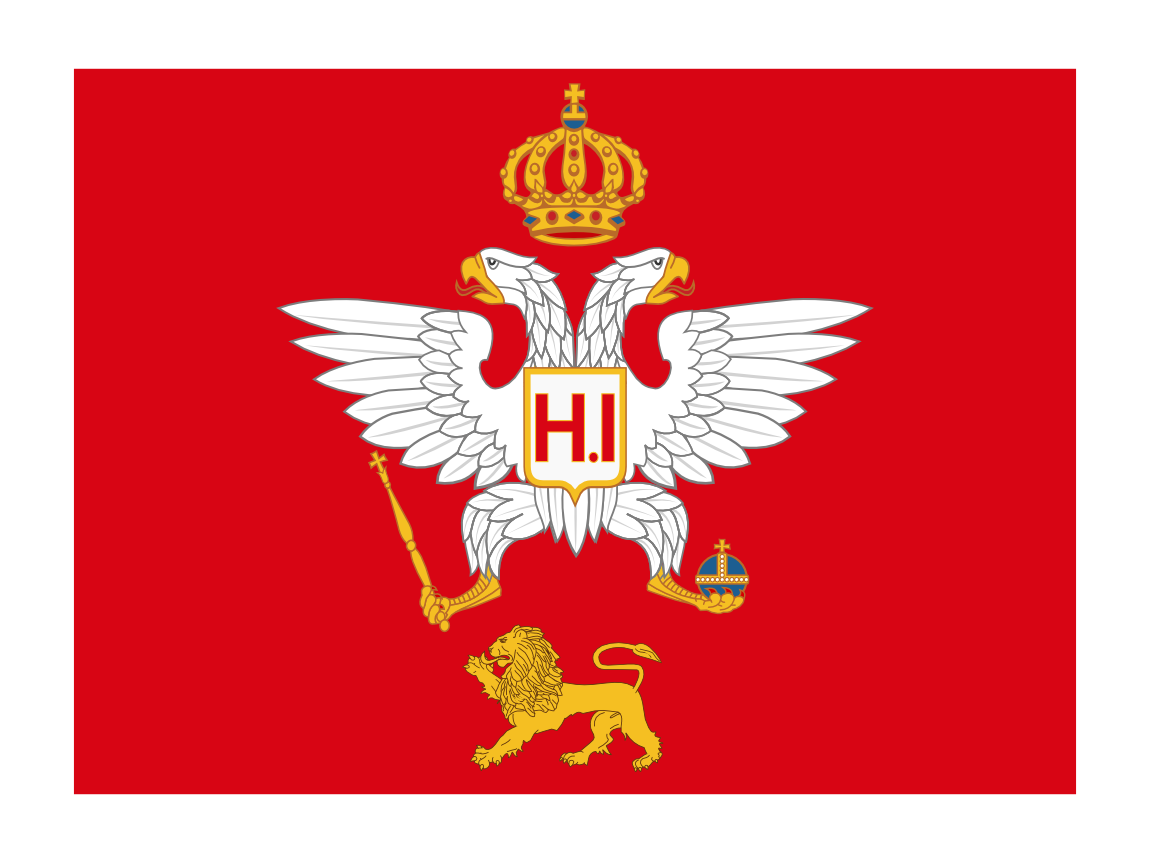
- Alaj-barjak was the flag of the Lovćen Brigade
- Country: Axis-occupied Yugoslavia
- Allegiance: Italian governorate of Montenegro

Commanders
- Current commander: Krsto Zrnov Popović

The Lovćen Brigade (Serbian: Ловћенска бригада, romanized: Lovćenska brigada) was an armed force in World War II Montenegro led by Krsto Zrnov Popović and the Greens. The unit was formed in September, 1942 with the approval of the Italian governorate of Montenegro.

== Formation ==
The army was made up of:

- I battalion, (based in Čevo, commanded by Dušan Vuković)
- II battalion (based in Rijeka Crnojevića, commanded by Đoko Drecun)
- III battalion (based in Gornji Brčeli, commanded by Petar Vuleković)
- IV battalion (based in Velimlje, commanded by Risto Radović)

== See also ==
Montenegrin Greens

== Sources ==
- Tomasevich, Jozo (1975). War and Revolution in Yugoslavia, 1941–1945: The Chetniks. Stanford: Stanford University Press. ISBN 978-0-8047-0857-9.
- Tomas, Nigel (1995). Axis Forces in Yugoslavia 1941-45. Osprey Publishing. ISBN 978-1-85532-473-2.
