= Gregorij Rožman =

Slovenian Roman Catholic prelate

His Excellency Gregorij Rožman
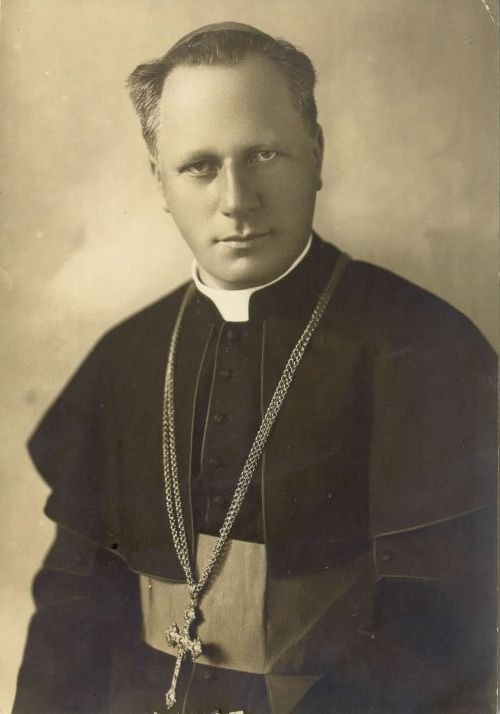
- Bishop of Ljubljana
- Diocese: Diocese of Ljubljana
- See: Ljubljana
- Installed: 17 May 1930
- Term ended: 16 November 1959
- Predecessor: Anton Bonaventura Jeglič
- Successor: Anton Vovk

Personal details
- Born: 9 March 1883 Dolintschitschach, Austria-Hungary
- Died: 16 November 1959 (aged 76) Cleveland, Ohio, U.S.

Gregorij Rožman (9 March 1883 – 16 November 1959) was a Slovenian Roman Catholic prelate. Between 1930 and 1959, he served as bishop of the Diocese of Ljubljana. He may be best remembered for his controversial role during World War II. Rožman was an ardent anti-communist and opposed the Liberation Front of the Slovene People and the Partisan forces because they were led by the Communist Party. He established relations with both the Fascist and Nazi powers, issued proclamations of support for the Axis authorities, and supported armed collaborationist forces organized by the Fascist and Nazi authorities. The Yugoslav communist government convicted him in absentia in August 1946 of treason for collaborating with the Nazis against the Yugoslav resistance. In 2009, his conviction was annulled on procedural grounds.

During the communist period, official historiography portrayed Rožman as a Nazi collaborator. Western historians, including Jozo Tomasevich and Gregor Kranjc have also, more recently, described Rožman as a collaborator, based on his proclamations and actions during the war. The Roman Catholic Church in Slovenia has been actively campaigning for his rehabilitation, claiming his actions were motivated solely to minimize the number of Slovenian casualties during the war. (Note: Statements, such as that he thought "... [U]rgently necessary for Slovene Home Guard to have more priests-curates than is customary for an ordinary army", because he believed it was necessary to maintain fighting spirit in volunteers by emphasizing the moral ideals of struggle against the communist revolution, are by them considered as proof that he acknowledged the Home Guard a military force in a religious war against communism.)

== Pre-war years ==
=== Early life ===
Rožman was born on 9 March 1883 into a Carinthian Slovene family in Dolintschitschach (Slovene: Dolinčiče) near Feistritz ob Bleiburg (Slovene: Bistrica pri Pliberku) in Austria-Hungary to Franc Rožman and Terezija (née Glinik) Rožman. The family lived on a medium-sized farm, had seven children (Gregorij was the youngest), and was severely indebted. In 1889, he started attending public school in St. Michael ob Bleiburg and then enrolled in a high school in Klagenfurt.

During his years in high school, he lived in the Marijinišče dormitory, which housed students that were expected to study theology after graduating. He published essays in the newsletter of Carinthian Slovenes Mir and also (under the pseudonym "Emil Fanič") in the handwritten student journal Vaje, for which he edited six issues from 7th grade until graduation. After graduating with honors in 1904, he studied theology in Klagenfurt. He joined the Academy of Slovene seminaries (Slovene: Akademija slovenskih bogoslovcev) becoming its president of it in his final year and published essays in its journal Bratoljub (which he edited in the 1906/07 academic year). At that time, Slovene students were in constant conflict with German students, who published their own journal, Germania. The conflict was over nationalistic frictions in Carinthia. He was a member of the Congregation of Mary (Slovene: Marijina kongregacija). In his last academic year he visited Rome with the Rev Anton Benetko, where he met Pope Pius X.

=== Parish priest, prefect and docent ===
On 21 July 1907, he was ordained in his home parish of St Michael (Slovene: Šmihel) by Bishop Jožef Khan. In 1908, he was sent as a chaplain to Ferlach. At that time Ferlach was politically controlled by German liberals. The workers were tending towards social democracy. He set to renew the spiritual life in his parish and was active in propagating Christian-social ideas and organising the workers. He stayed in Ferlach (Slovene: Borovlje) for one year.

On 1 October 1909, he went to Vienna to continue his study of theology. On 27 June 1912, he obtained a PhD (Slovene: Doktorat) in theology from Catholic Theology Faculty of University of Vienna. After returning he was appointed as a prefect in boys' seminary Marianum in Klagenfurt in 1912 and as a docent of moral theology in 1913. In the 1914/15 academic year, he was appointed a docent of Canon law and relieved of prefect service. In 1914 he taught moral theology to 4th grade at Klagenfurt and moral theology and canon law to the first three grades at Plešivec. He participated in Eucharistic Congress in Vienna in 1912 and as a result wrote a prayer book titled "Presveta Evharistija" (published in 1915 by Družba Sv. Mohorja). After the publication of a new Code of church law in 1917 he was appointed to a committee for its realization in Klagenfurt Diocese. He participated in the Slovene Christian-social (Slovene: Slovenska krščansko-socialna zveza) association as a lecturer.

The Treaty of St. Germain divided the plebiscite area in Carinthia into zone A and B. Zone A was under Yugoslav administration and lost control of Klagenfurt. Carinthian bishop Adam Hefter established a special vicariate in Ebendorf (Slovene: Dobrla Vas) in July 1919 and appointed Rožman as a judicial consultant of general vicar provost Matija Raindl. Because of his engagement with Carinthian Slovenes and his open support for Yugoslavia in the Carinthian Plebiscite it was quite clear that in case a majority in zone A decided against Yugoslavia in the plebiscite he would not be able to stay in Carinthia.

=== Canon law professor in Ljubljana ===
Soon after the integration of the Slovenes in Kingdom of Serbs, Croats and Slovenes, on 23 July 1919, Regent Alexander signed a law creating the University of Ljubljana and in December lectures commenced. Janez Zore, a church historian from the Theology faculty, proposed that Rožman be invited as a professor of church law. Rožman accepted, with permission from Bishop Hefter. Rožman began lecturing on 7 January 1920. He lived in Ljubljana with professor Alfonz Levičnik and took a position of prefect in the student's seminary Marijinišče in the 1920/21 academic year. After less than five months of teaching, on 31 May, he was nominated by his colleagues for a docent position and promoted by the ministry on 27 August. He was listed as an associate professor in the 1924/25 academic year.

He published many essays, both professional and pastoral, mostly in Bogoslovni Vestnik (English: Theological Journal). As in his lectures, his essays explained the practical pastoral implications of a law for a common priest. He included current events in his essays. He wrote an important essay titled Church and politics (Slovene: Cerkev in politika) (publication date unknown) which would become very relevant in the Second World War. In it he said that the Church "has the task to protect the truths of Christianity, that is moral and religious truths, to protect, teach and accustom the nations for them to organize all their lives and acts according to these truths". In his opinion many areas are not related to the Church, giving it no right to take sides or even decide on such issues. Instead, he claimed that the Church should limit itself to religious, moral or ecclesiastical issues. He also stated his opinion about coup d'état (or revolution) and any official government authority: he said that "the church is indifferent on different forms of authority, it considers none of them to be the only right one; it rejects none, as long as it is capable of reaching the purpose of the state". This purpose was to "protect justice for everybody and to care for public prosperity".

The Church "condemns as immoral and violent change of government, every revolution". However, if the violent takeover has occurred "the Church teaches that the highest duty of every government is to take care of public prosperity. At the time of revolution, the highest duty of the government and the citizens is to end chaos as soon as possible and to build on the ruins of the old a new state, which will function as a device of public prosperity. If the revolutionary government is strong and able enough to positively organize the state to reach its goal, than this highest duty requires of every citizen to recognize the new government.". In these essays he stated that in time of war, the Church's duty is to "reduce the horror of the war" and care for war prisoners.

Another important essay was Church and the state (Slovene: Cerkev in država), which was used for a lecture at the fifth Catholic rally in Ljubljana on 28 August 1923. In it he explained his relation to government, writing, "the source of every authority, even political, is God. Every authority is given for the welfare of the humanity". He added that state sovereignty cannot be absolute, as it is dependent on God, which limits that authority, the limits "which it should not cross, if it does not want to abuse its power against the will of God, in which name it wields the sword (Romans 13,4)". He says that the common concern of both, the church and the state, is marriage, children and education. Disagreement between them in these areas causes great damage to the citizens and to the state itself. He criticized the Kingdom of Yugoslavia under the Vidovdan Constitution, which set limits on church autonomy, saying that the "annunciation of the religious truth is one of the main tasks of the Catholic Church and its inner affair", so "we must, on the basis of our catholic principles, reject every attempt to institute a police control over the church in its own matters".

=== Involvement in the Orel ===
Orel was a Slovenian Roman Catholic youth gymnastic and sport movement that was organized in the early 20th century as an alternative to a liberal gymnastic movement Sokol. The decision to create it was taken at a gathering of Slovene Christian-social association in Maribor, between 3 and 4 September 1905. The first club was established in Jesenice, in February 1906. Then on 10 April 1908, the Association of Gymnastic Sections (Slovene: Zveza Telovadnih Odsekov) was created. On 19 March 1909 at a local assembly of AGS in Bohinjska Bistrica, the organisation was officially named Orel. Rožman learned of the organisation in Carinthia, as by 1913, its section had five sub-sections.

In 1920, in Ljubljana, he was elected by the Orel president board as secondary vice-president. As a priest, he quickly became its spiritual leader. As the organisation in Orel began to evolve, he took leadership of debate club, high-school students and other elements. After it was rebuilt in the newly established Kingdom of Serbs, Croats and Slovenes, Orel greatly expanded its membership, but neglected its spiritual and religious side. In 1921 Rožman wrote an article in the Theological Journal, Contributions for pastoral profession (Slovene: Prispevki za dušno pastirstvo) in which he expressed his ideas about pastoral activity of youth organisations (like Orel).

He first asked whether the organisation should attend equally to everyone or focus on the elite athletes. He proposed a compromise, saying that the Catholic Church is required to pastorally attend anyone that counts himself as its member, but that its missionary activity could be advanced by success in sports, especially among the youth. He emphasized the need for youth to be part of Christian organisations, because if the youngsters were left alone, they could easily fall under the influence of materialism and so become communists or social democrats. He highlighted the importance of spiritual growth, advising Orel members to join Mary's congregation (as they were more focused on spiritual life than Orel). In addition, he emphasized the importance for Orel of family values, national consciousness and other Christian values.

He left Orel in 1929, when he became suffragan bishop. The Yugoslav government banned Orel, leaving only the state-controlled Sokol shortly afterwards.

=== Bishop of Ljubljana ===
He was appointed as co-adjutor bishop of Ljubljana on 17 March 1929, and consecrated titular Bishop of Semta on 14 July 1929. He succeeded as Bishop of Ljubljana on 17 May 1930. As a bishop, he set out to spiritually renew his diocese, starting with his priests, who he felt should not be involved in politics. After leaving Orel, he focused on the Marian societies (Slovene: Marijine Družbe), but mainly on Catholic Action, in which he saw the strongest tool for the renewal of his diocese. In the argument between two Christian youth organisations—Youth of Christ the King (sl) (whose members were known as the Mladci or Youth), led by the high-school teacher Ernest Tomec (sl), and the Guard (sl) academic club (whose members were known as the Stražarji or Guards), led by the theology professor Lambert Ehrlich. Both groups claimed to represent Catholic Action—Rožman decided in favor of the Mladci.

== Second World War ==
=== Background and wartime situation in Slovenia ===
In the interwar period Slovenia was part of Yugoslavia. The strongest political force in the province was the Slovenska Ljudska Stranka (SLS-Slovene People's Party), under the heavy influence of the Catholic Church. The Canadian historian Gregor Kranjc notes "In [SLS] propaganda the Catholic Church and national traditions were facing a colossal struggle against atheistic, international revolutionaries".

Fascism exerted a strong attraction. In 1933 the SLS-friendly Catholic daily "Slovenec" (The Slovenian) wrote: "Whatever is positive in Fascism is taken from Christianity, and in this course Fascism must absolutely be part of the anti-Bolshevik front". The strongly anti-semitic leader of the SLS, Anton Korošec, was responsible for anti-Semitic laws Yugoslavia enacted in 1940, restricting Jews in entering schools and universities (see Antisemitism in Europe). Right-wing, fascist-inspired Catholic student organizations, such as Straža were active. All these became part of the collaborationist forces soon after the Axis takeover.

Following the invasion on 6 April 1941, the Axis powers divided the Slovenia's territory between themselves. Nazi Germany annexed Lower Styria, but later dropped annexing Carinthia because of Partisan activity. Italy annexed the so-called "Provincia di Lubiana" on 3 May 1941. Hungary realized their formal annexation on 16 December 1941. Although fascist Italy had brutally repressed Slovenes in the Littoral for two decades, they initially promised some (never-delivered) autonomy for Slovenes in the annexed Ljubljana Province and left most of the old administration in place. Italian was introduced as an optional language in schools and universities and at first, there was little violence. They accepted 18,000 refugees expelled from the German zone. This can be to some degree attributed to the cooperation ("collaboration") of notable Slovenian public figures. Collaboration with the Ayis forces began almost immediately. Rožman, then SLS-head Marko Natlačen and other prominent Slovenes pledged loyalty to Fascist Italy in April and May 1941. Later as the resistance grew, Italian authorities interned some 40,000 Slovenes in concentration camps, where 7,000 reportedly died.

The Nazis chose a policy of violent Germanisation. They planned to expel 240,000 Slovenes, but due to Partisan resistance expelled some 83,000 Slovenes to other parts of the Third Reich, as well as to Serbia and Croatia. More than 63,000 Slovenes were interned in Nazi concentration camps The Slovenian language was banned from public use, Slovenian cultural associations were dissolved, etc. The Nazis were hostile to the church: much of its property was confiscated, 448 priests were forced into exile, and the authorities rejected any intervention by the church. The Hungarian regime was similar to the German approach. Resistance was organized by the Liberation Front of the Slovene People, led by the Communist Party, but including 18 other groups (Christian Socialists, the gymnastic group Sokol, etc.)

The Communist Party saw the Axis takeover as a chance to gain power. It was weak in numbers but experienced in underground activities, because it was banned in Yugoslavia. The Liberation Front first developed in the Italian-annexed territory. On 16 September 1941 it declared it was the only "authorized" resistance. Traitors were to be sentenced to death. In this way Slovenes, including Church representatives (most notably Lambert Ehrlich, assassinated after he wrote a letter to the Fascist authorities, asking that they arm Slovenes, to jointly fight against the Partisans), were "liquidated" by "Security-Intelligence Service", called VOS, a unit recruited solely from the Communist Party and communist youth organization SKOJ. The inhabitants of the province of Ljubljana, especially peasants, suffered from both Italian attacks on their lives and property and from Partisan attacks. Partisans stayed in a village for a few weeks, confiscating food and property in return for "freedom loan" certificates promising the return of property after liberation. When the Italians located the Partisans, the Partisans fled and the Army punished the villagers. After a short period the soldiers retreated to their base, the Partisans would return and the cycle continue. According to the fascist Commissar Grazioli, the Partisans liberated two-thirds of the Ljubljana Province by mid-1942.

This caused the Italian fascist authorities to organize a brutal offensive against the Partisans in summer 1942, with 80.000 well-armed Italian troops to combat some 2,500 to 3,000 poorly-armed Partisans. The Italians shot on the spot all Slovenes caught with arms or forged documents, relatives of Partisans and thousands of young Slovene men were rounded up and sent to concentration camps. With the aid of Slovene collaborationist forces, the fascist authorities also managed to kill some 1,000 Partisans.

In the fall of 1942, at Rožman's urging, the collaborationist forces (Slovene Legion, National Legion, Sokol Legion and Slovene Chetniks) gathered in the Legion of Death, became part of the MVAC forces, armed and led by the Italian military. Later these collaborationist forces joined the SS-commanded Home Guard, to fight with the Germans against the Partisans. Meanwhile, American and British Allies sent observers to the Partisans. In recognition of their success in fighting Axis forces, the Allies formally recognized the Partisans in 1943, supporting them with arms and materiel. Partisans also performed "revolutionary" or "red" violence – violence targeted against enemies. The enemies included people opposed to communism, especially Catholics, wealthier people, and ethnic German civilians. This violence was especially frequent and brutal in spring and early summer 1942 (which led to spontaneous creations of village guards against such violence)". Among the victims during the war were 46 diocesan priests and 6 priests belonging to different religious orders. By comparison, the Axis forces killed 24 diocesan priests and 10 priests of different religious orders.

On the other side, Slovene collaborationist forces, like the Black Hand organization, arrested, tortured, killed and turned over many Slovenes to the Fascist and Nazi authorities. One example is the noted Slovene author Boris Pahor who along with 600 other Slovenes was turned over to the Nazis by Slovene collaborationist forces, all of them sent to the Dachau concentration camps. Altogether, more than 11,000 Slovenes were killed in Italian and German concentration camps. During the war, close to 70,000 Slovenes were killed by the Axis forces and their domestic collaborators, while some 4,000 Slovenes were killed on the collaborationist side during the war, and an additional 14,000 in reprisals after the war (the vast majority of the latter were soldiers in the collaborationist forces).

=== Relations with Italians ===
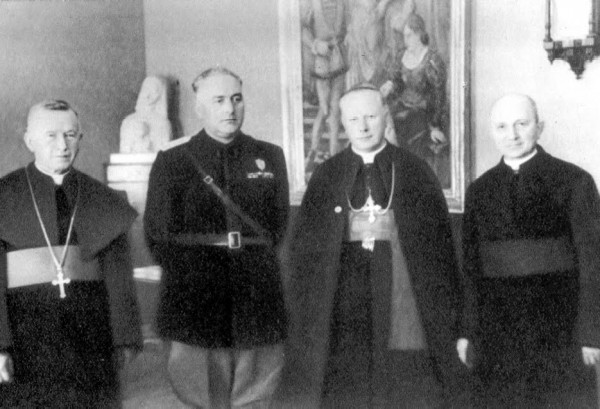
From left: Ignacij Nadrah, Fascist High Commissioner Emilio Grazioli, Bishop Rožman and Franc Kimovec, 22 April 1941

The bishop and Church dignitaries wanted the people to survive the war with as few victims as possible. Rožman was convinced that for such a small nation an armed struggle against the Axis forces was doomed to fail, because the sacrifices would be out of proportion to any possible gains.

On 20 April, three days after the capitulation of Yugoslavia, Rožman met with fascist Commissioner Emilio Grazioli and declared the Church's loyalty and willingness to collaborate with the new Fascist authorities. After the Italians issued the Statute of Autonomy on 3 May 1941, they expected the bishop to write a declaration of loyalty. He addressed a so-called declaration of loyalty to High Commissioner Emilio Grazioli, but the High Commissioner was not satisfied with its wording. He forged another declaration and directed it to Mussolini. Grazioli's text was published in the press. The original version read:

Excellency! A decree has been published today, via which the Slovenian territory occupied by the Italian army has been incorporated into Italy. When I consider this, I thank your Excellency ... I express absolute loyalty and ask God to bless you and our aspirations for the welfare of our people.

Rožman actually emphasized free development in cultural and religious spheres and promised loyalty and sent blessings for the efforts of the authorities for the good of the people. The forgery was so effective that many publications still use it as a proof of Rožman's collaboration.

In his own diocesan newspaper Rožman wrote that following the annexation of the Ljubljana province to Italy, he actually told the fascist Commissioner, Grazioli, the following:

As for the cooperation of the representatives of the Church with the new authorities of fascist Italy, the authoritative word of God for us Catholics says: "Let every man be of the highest."obedient to the authorities; for there is no authority except from God, and those that are, are from God established" (Romans, 13, 1). From this point of view, we recognize the authority that is above us, and according to our conscience, we will gladly collaborate for the temporal and eternal benefit of the people, among which among which God's Providence made us priests...We are grateful to God that He has inspired in the leader of Greater Italy the thoughts of generous justice and considerate wisdom with which His Majesty ... suggested the foundation of the Ljubljana province".

Rožman thus welcomed Mussolini's annexation of Ljubljana Province to Italy and indicated his willingness to cooperate with the Fascist authorities. Rožman regularly attended events with the highest representatives of the Fascist authorities: on 5 May, the ceremonial Italian army parade; on 22 May, Rožman held a thanksgiving mass for the end of the war against Yugoslavia with fascist commissar, Grazioli, and Italian generals in attendance; on 6 June, at Italian military headquarters he listened to Mussolini's speech with generals Robotti and Orlando, etc. Rožman's actions supported efforts by pre-war Slovene political parties who sought to find accommodation with the Axis takeover, and were thus in direct opposition to the stance of the Yugoslav government-in-exile and the Allies, who did not accept the defeat, occupation, and partitioning of Yugoslavia. Italian propaganda efforts took full advantage of his willingness to oblige, leading to Rožman being criticized by priests from Primorska region, where the fascist authorities had repressed and Italianized Slovenes for decades.

Rožman played a key role in arranging an audience with the pope for the Ustaše leader Ante Pavelić, head of the fascist, Nazi-puppet Independent State of Croatia. Rožman personally vouched for and recommended Pavelić to the pope, despite Pavelić having been sentenced to death in absentia in France, for organizing the 1934 assassination of Yugoslavia's King Alexander. Rožman was also well aware of Pavelić's totalitarian, anti-Jewish and anti-Serb policies. The resulting audience with the pope led to sharp protestations to the Vatican by the Yugoslav government-in-exile.

Rožman condemned the Axis forces twice. On 24 October 1941 he wrote a letter to the clergy in which he complained about the devastation of the part of his diocese annexed by the Germans: in it all Church property was confiscated, religious enrollees of both sexes were expelled from their convents and 193 members of secular clergy expelled from 148 parishes and that about 200,000 of his people were without spiritual care.

On 26 September 1942, Rožman handed Grazzioli a memorandum, in which he criticized Italian means and proposed facilitating measures in 20 points. Grazzioli was furious and told him that if Rožman were not a bishop, he would have had him arrested. Rožman wanted to condemn Italians from the pulpit, but during his visit to Rome in May 1942 the Pope advised him not to do so because the Italians would detain him in Italy and he would be unable to help the people of Ljubljana.

==== Memorandum of 12 September 1942 ====
In August 1942, the Italian generals Roatta and Robotti visited Rožman and told him they would burn the whole Province of Ljubljana and kill or deport all of its inhabitants if the attacks by Partisans did not stop. Rožman invited 21 representatives of the former political parties and of cultural institutions to discuss the Italian threats (20 of whom came). They agreed only to organize help for the victims.

After the meeting a memorandum was written. Only the German translation was located, leaving unanswered questions about its authors and quality of translation (the memorandum is in many respects similar to one written in April 1942 by the Rev Lambert Ehrlich, Ljubljana University theologian and supervisor of a right-wing Slovene Catholic student youth group, who the fascist authorities to arm Slovenes to fight the Partisans) The bishop's contribution is unknown other than that he delivered the memorandum to General Robotti, commander of the Italian 11th Army Corps. The memo read:

From the sound part of the Slovene people, who have declared themselves ready to seriously work together with the Italian authorities for the purpose of reestablishing order and destroying subversive and rebellious elements, the following is proposed to the military authorities:

- We should be allowed to establish protective armed units under Slovene command in all rural areas. The names of the members and commanders of these armed units will be supplied to the military authorities. ... The commanders of these units will be selected from men worthy of trust, to fully guarantee that the arms will be used exclusively against rebellious elements that endanger the land either with arms or revolutionary propaganda.
- We are convinced that without the proposed system of protective units, no self-supporting or lasting order can be maintained. The soldiers have already dispersed the camps and groups of the rebels, but many of them are still in the woods and in villages, where they are camouflaged as peace-loving citizens. Such persons are not known to the Italian armed forces. Because of their unfamiliarity with the language and the difficulty of finding those who help those who hide in the woods, it will be very difficult to find the culprits. But for the local young men such difficulties are nonexistent or can easily be overcome ...
- In addition to the protective units stationed in rural areas, it would be necessary to establish a few central units under the command of former Yugoslav officers. The task of these units would be to keep wooded areas under surveillance and to prevent the formation of armed Partisan groups.
- To achieve the given objective, it would be necessary to bring back some young, dependable former Yugoslav officers from prisoner-of-war camps, but in an unobtrusive fashion, as if letting the officers home on furlough. Their names would be proposed by us.
- In regard to Ljubljana, the following is proposed as urgent: ... We should be allowed, so to speak, to establish a Corps of Secret Police of 500 men, to be armed with revolvers. We can give assurances that within six weeks, dangerous elements would be found, arrested and turned over to the authorities. Those persons who have false identification cards and who freely circulate in the streets would be identified and arrested with the help of the citizens. In this way Ljubljana would become a peaceful and orderly city in which there would be no more communists. At the same time everything would be done to remold public opinion with the help of strong and continuing anti-communist propaganda.

These sincere proposals show the goodwill of the majority of the population and create the possibility of achieving the given objective in a manner that must also please the authorities. His Excellence, General Roatta, has said that the people must now choose between order and Bolshevism. We have chosen order, and propose the only way that in our humble opinion will be effective and certain to achieve complete order in active collaboration with the authorities.

The document containing the German translation is in the Library of Congress in Washington, D.C. Also preserved are Robotti's notes in which he refers to Rožman as the author and adds, "[T]he security guards that the bishop suggests, correspond with local militias that have the task of defending their villages against communists, and to be available for actions in the local area – there are many such militias, which count a total of 1,000 men. These are doing their work decisively, not only from a military standpoint, but also as police, as the bishop says ...".

==== Memorandum Aftermath ====
The Italian fascist authorities followed through on many of the recommendations in Rožman's memorandum. Jozo Tomasevich indicated that the bishop's support led to the rapid growth of the Italian-led MVAC units, which absorbed "The Legion of Death" forces which had informally collaborated with the Italians in their brutal offensive against the Partisans in the summer of 1942. The Italians also released Yugoslav Army officers. At the urging of the SLS and other Slovene collaborationist groups, in March 1942 the Italians apprehended and sent to POW camps 1,100 Yugoslav Army officers, since Slovene collaborationist groups saw them as a threat. Now at the urging of the same SLS and Rožman, the Italians released some of the officers, but only those willing to fight against the Partisans.

=== Relations with Liberation Front ===
The main resistance group, the Liberation Front, which included groups such as the Social Christians, as well as priests, made multiple appeals to Rožman. The first of these was a letter the leadership of the Liberation Front sent to Rožman on 30 November 1941 They noted the increasing involvement of priests with right-wing groups which would form the core of Slovene collaborationist forces. At the same time the Liberation Front indicated its support for freedom of religion, and stated they would like to see more priests in their movement, or at the very least would like to see priests remain neutral. They also indicated that they would be willing to meet with Rožman and discuss all issues. Rožman never responded to the letter.

Three additional letters were addressed to Rožman in 1942, by Catholics in Liberation Front, beseeching him and other members of the Church not to support collaborationist forces, which were fighting on the side of the Axis forces, causing much Slovene bloodshed, and instead urged the church to remain neutral. Edvard Kocbek, leader of the Christian Socialists, wrote a fifth letter to Rožman in 1943, criticizing Rožman for not responding to the previous missives from the Liberation Front, and for continuing to allow priests to take part in the political and military work of collaborationist forces. As with previous letters, Rožman did not respond to Kocbek either

The Liberation Front included many believers in its ranks, and some 40 priests joined the Partisans in Ljubljana Province alone. Among them was the noted historian and priest Metod Mikuž, who at one time had served as secretary to Rožman. Mikuž and two other priest became members of the Plenum, the Liberation Front's highest governing body. For his activities among the Partisans, Rožman suspended Mikuž from the Church in 1943.

=== Stance towards communism ===
For Rožman as well as for the most Church representatives, the fact that by communists dominated the "Liberation Front" (and performed murderous sanctions against the perceived traitors) presented a special dilemma. The Church detested the violation of human rights and repression, but also found Marxism and Bolshevism incompatible with Church doctrine. The ideological differences were the subject of the anti-communist encyclical Divini Redemptoris issued in 1937 by Pope Pius XI on which Rožman based his stance. The bishop rejected in 1938 as irrelevant for Slovenia the Pope's clarification to French Roman Catholics that the encyclical did not require absolute noncooperation with communists.

The communists began using violent methods to gain political power, which Church authorities could not accept. In 1943, after the siege and fall of Turjak and Battle of Grčarice, followed by mass liquidations at Jelendol, Mozelj and other places and the show trial in Kočevje he dedicated all four Advent sermons to the evils of communist ideology, citing Russia and Spain.

Rožman said that it is his duty to speak the truth, otherwise he would have to justify himself in front of God. He preached "Do zadnjega bom trdil in učil, da je brezbožni komunizem največje zlo in največja nesreča za slovenski narod" ("English: To the end I will claim and teach that atheistic communism is the greatest evil and greatest tragedy for the Slovene nation.") At the funeral of Marko Natlačen, who was executed by a member of VOS at home on 12 October 1942, Rožman stated that there could be

no co-operation, no association with godlessness or those to whom godlessness is a leading opinion. Stand firm in your belief in God, build your future on God's Commandments, which alone can be a firm basis of healthy development of any nation, big or small. Stay alive – my nation – don't kill yourself and don't provoke measures able to corrupt your life force. (Note: Slovene: Nobenega sodelovanja, nobene zveze z brezboštvom in tistimi, ki jim je brezboštvo vodilni nazor. Trdno stoj v veri v Boga, zidaj prihodnost svojo na božje zapovedi, ki so edini trdni temelj zdravega razvoja vsakemu narodu, velikemu in malemu. Ostani živ – narod moj – ne ubijaj samega sebe in ne izzivaj ukrepov, ki te morajo zadeti v tvoji življenjski sili.)

In his Pastoral letter on the dangers of godless communism (Slovene: Pastirsko pismo o nevarnosti brezbožnega komunizma) on 30 November 1943 he urged Catholics to "fight godless communism" through prayers. Rožman wrote

I know that advocates of communism and some other blind Catholics will reproach me that I am meddling in politics in a pastoral letter, which isn't a matter for a bishop and doesn't appertain to the Church. But, dear believers, the battle against communism isn't political, but a religious matter, as it touches upon belief in God, one of the most basic truths of every faith, especially our Christian faith. To reject atheistic doctrines, to defend the truths of our global religion is a religious matter and a religious duty, that admits everyone with common sense. (Note: Slovene: "Vem, da mi bodo zagovorniki komunizma in še nekateri zaslepljeni katoličani očitali, da se s tem pastirskim pismom vmešavam v politiko, kar ni zadeva škofa in kar ne spada v cerkev. Toda, predragi verniki, boj proti brezbožnemu komunizmu ni politika, ampak verska zadeva, saj se vendar tiče vere v Boga, torej najbolj osnovne resnice vsake vere, posebno še naše krščanske vere. Zavračati brezbožne nauke, braniti resnice naše svete vere je verska zadeva in verska dolžnost, to pač spozna vsak, ki ima zdravo pamet.")

In his Christmas message to the Slovene Home Guard in 1944, Rožman talked about shepherds in Bethlehem keeping watch over their flock in the fields and asked the Home Guard to take an example by them.

You are defending your nation against wolves and jackals who destroy lives and property of their own fellow-countrymen, against 'tenants, who do not care about their sheep', who are poisoning souls with foreign mentality of godless communism and through that they break down the spiritual foundations, on which all the spiritual wealth that we have in common with Christian Europe, has been built for centuries. (Note: Slovene: "Vi branite svoj narod pred volkovi in šakali, ki uničujejo življenje in imetje svojim lastnim rojakom, pred »najemniki, ki jim za ovce ni skrb«, ki s tujo miselnostjo brezbožnega komunizma zastrupljajo duše in s tem rušijo duhovne temelje, na katerih je bilo v stoletjih zgrajeno vse, kar imamo duhovnega bogastva, skupnega s krščansko Evropo.")

=== Interventions for prisoners ===
Rožman intervened for detainees directly with the Italian authorities and via the Vatican. He reportedly attempted to protect deportees (to Serbia, Croatia and Germany), including clergymen, refugees, Serbs, Jews, prisoners of war, and others. He intervened 1318 times on behalf of at least 1210 individuals. (Note: This number is probably larger, as families for which he has intervened were counted as 3-member families, although families at that time normally had more than only three members)

He intervened for various groups (for example 350 priests, deported to Croatia by Germans or 1700 children in the Italian concentration camps) covering more than 2495 people. (Note: It is assumed that the groups, for which the number of persons is not known, together counted several hundred people) The bishop's secretary, Stanislav Lenič, testified that up to 50 petitioners came on a single day and that he helped them regardless of their political views. Among many documents a letter written by Gastone Gambarra, Commander of the Italian XI Army Corps, on 26 April 1943 documents that 122 internees were released because of his intervention. But the Italians noticed the bishop made no distinctions in his choices, so Grazioli ordered his subordinates to treat the bishop's interventions with no greater alacrity than those of anyone else, as the bishop had been purportedly intervening for the "unworthy".

Some of Rožman's interventions were made to gain officers for collaborationist forces. In his 12 September 1942 letter to the fascist general Robotti (quoted above), Rožman wrote that only "dependable" former Yugoslav officers, i.e. those willing to fight on the fascist side, should be released from Italian POW camps. The Italians followed Rozman's recommendations, releasing only "dependable" officers, while keeping all others in concentration camps. In the same letter Rožman proposed the fascist authorities create Slovene collaborationist units and Secret Police, to capture and turn over Slovenes to the Axis Forces, something both the Italians and Nazis implemented

In 1946, in Rome, Rožman himself told Bishop Joe B. Žabkar: "All the contacts I have had with the Italians, I sincerely regret. All of them. I have not achieved one thing, haven't rescued not one hostage, prevented not one deportation, saved not even one house from arson fire, eased not one single suffering. Nothing, absolutely nothing. They always promised me everything, but never gave me anything."

=== Relations with Germans ===
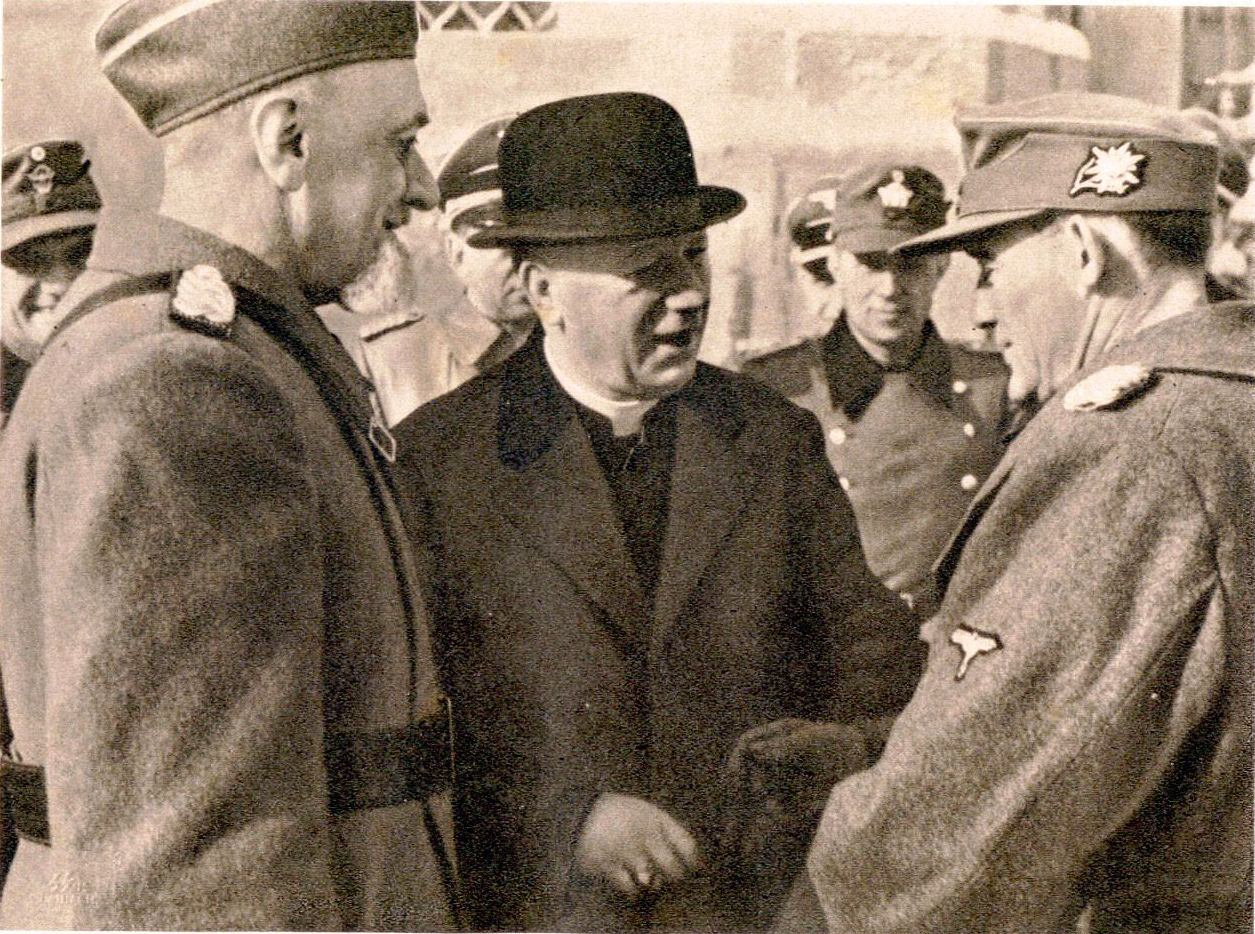
Leon Rupnik, Bishop Gregorij Rožman, and SS-General Erwin Rösener

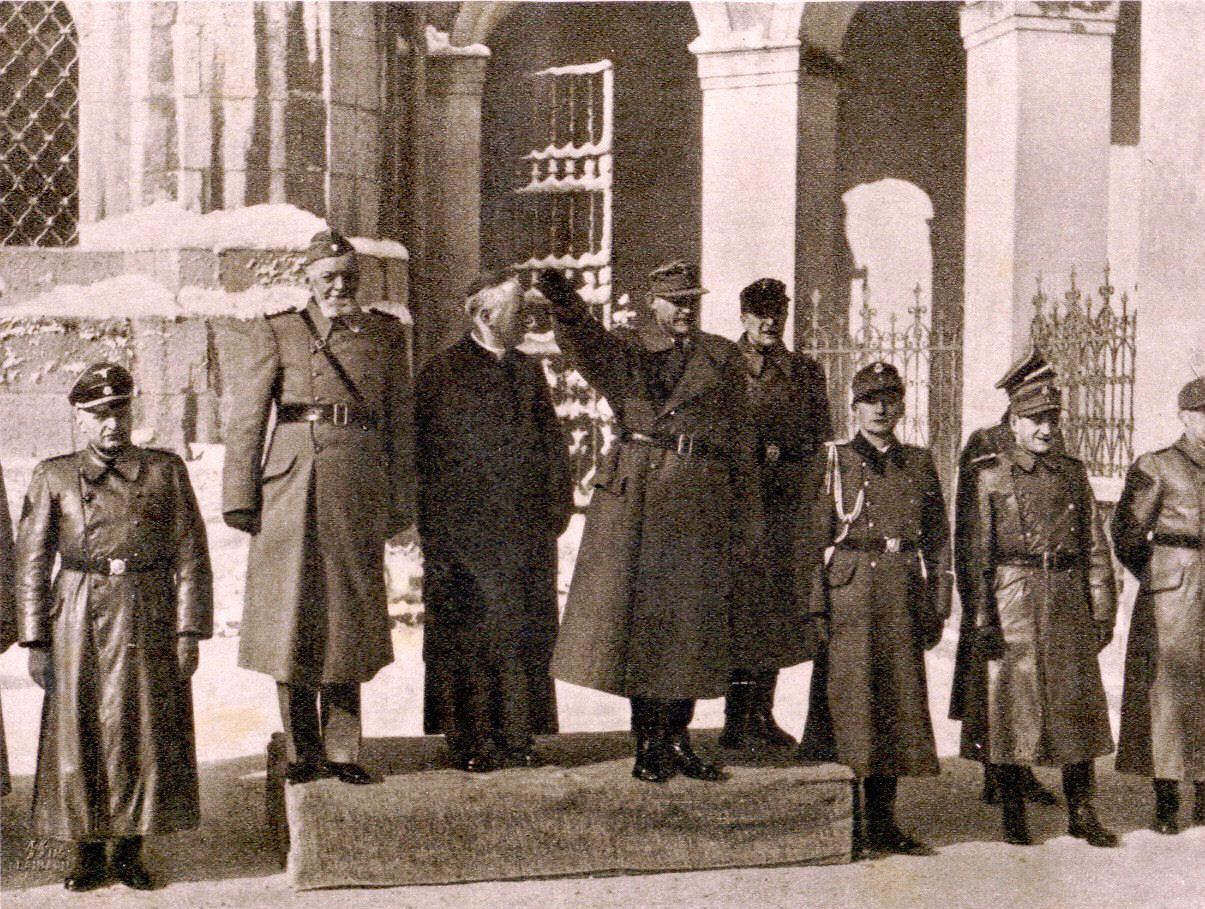
Bishop Rožman, SS-General Erwin Rösener and Leon Rupnik review Home Guard troops in front of Ursuline Church, Ljubljana, after the second Home Guard oath of allegiance, on 30 January 1945.

After the capitulation of Italy (in September 1943), Ljubljana was occupied by the Germans. On 14 September 1943, the Nazi Gauleiter, Friedrich Rainer, met with Rožman to consult with him on setting up the new Nazi administration. Rainer had led the forced Germanization of the Slovene provinces of Styria, Carinthia and Upper Carniola, from where he expelled 83,000 Slovenes, including 448 priests, plus teachers and others to Serbia and Nazi concentration camps, confiscated Slovene businesses and church property, and forbade the use of Slovene in schools and public institutions.

Rainer told Rožman that Upper Carniola, like Styria and Carinthia, would remain annexed to Nazi Germany, but promised Nazi support to Slovene collaborationists. Rožman gave Rainer a surprisingly detailed account of battles Slovene collaborationist forces were waging against the Partisans. Rainer asked Rožman's opinion of Leon Rupnik (Slovene mayor of Ljubljana under the Fascists, and a notorious anti-Semite), whom he planned to appoint Nazi administrator of Ljubljana. Rožman concurred with the appointment, stating that he knew no one better qualified for the job. Rupnik was appointed as president of the Nazi provincial government on 22 September 1943.

Rožman was photographed multiple times at formal and informal events chatting with SS General Erwin Rösener, the commander of German forces in the province, who reported directly to Heinrich Himmler. Rösener had ordered the execution of Slovene civilians, hostages and prisoners of war, which led to him being named in the indictment for war crimes at Nuremberg. On 24 September 1942, on Rösener's initiative, the Germans established the anti-Partisan, anti-communist Domobranci, i.e. the Slovenian Home Guard, as an SS-auxiliary force.

Rožman support of the Nazis and his antisemitism is evident in a pastoral letter published on 30 November 1943, in which Rožman wrote "only by this courageous fighting and industrious work for God, for the people and the Fatherland will we, under the leadership of Germany, assure our existence and better future in the fight against the Jewish conspiracy."

On 20 April 1944, Hitler's birthday, Rožman held a silent mass for the Home Guard, prior to their swearing a collective oath of allegiance to fight alongside the SS and German police under the leadership of the Führer Adolf, Hitler, against the Partisans and their Allies (the Allies had recognized the Partisans as an allied army in 1943). According to some witnesses, he chose to observe events from the background despite the offer of place on the main stand and left quickly afterwards. He declined to hold the mass at the second oath of allegiance to German forces on 30 January 1945 (the anniversary of the Nazi's coming to power), but Rožman appeared on the main stand, next to SS-General Erwin Rösener, while reviewing the Home Guard troops in front of the Ursuline Church. This decision led to speculation about his motives. In his Christmas message to the SS-commanded Home Guard at the end of 1944, Rožman wrote: "You are defending your nation against wolves and jackals ... who are poisoning souls with the foreign mentality of atheistic communism". In January 1944, Rožman wrote the commander of the Home Guard to emphasize the importance of Slovene Catholic chaplains in installing combativeness and ideological enthusiasm among the troops.

The two Home Guard oaths of allegiance to the Nazis, attended by bishop Rožman, led to even greater Allied distrust of the Home Guard. Opposed to the western Allies' recognition of the Partisans and their support for the Tito-Šubašić Agreement, on 21 April 1945, Rožman and Leon Rupnik wrote the Ustashe leader, Ante Pavelić, proposing a political and military alliance to continue fighting the Partisans, and to try to gain recognition for the Slovene Home Guard, Ustashe and Chetniks from the Western allies, for a postwar Yugoslavia . Nothing came of the effort, and the Western Allies continued their support of the Partisans. On 3 May 1945, Rožman attended the meeting of the Slovenian Alliance which welcomed the re-establishment of the Kingdom of Yugoslavia in the Tabor Declaration. They renamed the collaborationist Home Guards the Slovenian National Army and declared them liberators, while ordering them to withdraw along with German forces to Austria.

== Post-war ==
At the end of the war, Rožman fled with his car and driver to the Tyrol in the British zone of Austria.

Rožman was tried for treason in absentia by the military court of the 4th Yugoslav Army. He was convicted and sentenced to 18 years imprisonment and forced labour, lifelong loss of citizenship and limitation of citizen rights on 30 August 1946. Since Rožman fled Slovenia without Pope Pius XII's permission, he was never assigned another formal position in the Church, and he was also denied ad limina, direct communication with the Pope.

== After the war ==
Various leading Catholic figures from Yugoslavia were indicted for alleged war crimes, but escaped from justice, including Bishop Ivan Šarić of Vrhbosna in Sarajevo, who had supported the forcible conversion of non-Catholics to Catholicism. Rožman, Šarić and others had been living under British supervision at the bishop's palace at Klagenfurt, Austria, in October 1946.

Rožman began to appear in American and British intelligence reports as being involved in ratlines that spirited wanted Axis and collaborationist fugitives out of Europe. To get an American visa, Rožman did not visit the consulate in Bern; he communicated with the United States Consulate General at Zürich on 25 May for the purpose of obtaining a visitor's visa to the United States. On 28 May, he appeared at the Consulate General where he was informed of U.S. regulations regarding the issue of a non-quota immigration visa as a minister of religion. Rožman and Šarić were not together in Switzerland. Rožman was residing at the Institut Menzingen, near Zug, and Šarić was residing at Haute Rive near Friborg.

In Bern, Rožman's Ustashi friends were engaged in wholesale fraud, using the black market to convert the gold into dollars, and later, into Austrian schillings. 'Aid to the refugees is accounted for at the official rate of exchange for dollars', the American officers noted, adding that 'malpractices have been carried on (officially, the dollar is worth 10 schillings; on the black market, 100 to 150). According to reliable information: 'Rožman is going to Bern to take care of these finances. The money is in a Swiss bank, and he plans to have most of it sent through to Italy and from there to the Ustaše in [the] Argentine.'

A short time later Rožman duly arrived in Bern, accompanied by Bishop Ivan Šarić, the 'hangman' of Sarajevo. By the end of May 1948, Rožman had apparently carried out this money laundering operation for the Ustashi, for he visited the U.S. Consulate in Zürich and was given a 'non-quota immigration visa as a minister of religion'. He then traveled to the United States and settled in Cleveland, Ohio. The circle was now almost complete. Pavelić's stolen 'treasure' had been tracked down through close monitoring of the movements and activities of the quisling Bishop of Ljubljana. ...

After settling permanently in Cleveland, Ohio, Rožman is recorded as having visited Argentina on three occasions, in 1949, 1952 and 1956. He died in Cleveland on 16 November 1959, aged 76. Rožman was buried in the Franciscan cemetery in Lemont, Illinois. His remains were returned to Ljubljana and reinterred in the Ljubljana Cathedral on 13 April 2013.

== Rehabilitation and lawsuits ==
After Slovene independence in the 1990s, a request was made by the Catholic Church, to reevaluate Rožman's conviction. An official request for the reevaluation was made by Slovenian Public Prosecutor Anton Drobnič prior to the visit to Slovenia by Pope John Paul II in 1999. Anton Drobnič ordered two historians, Tamara Griesser Pečar and France M. Dolinar, to prepare a thesis or defence for this retrial. This was later published in Rožmanov proces. On the basis that he should have had the right to defend himself, Rožman's 1946 conviction was overturned by the Slovenian Supreme Court in 2007 and his case sent to the court of first instance for retrial. On 10 April 2009, the trial was terminated in light of the defendant's death.

== See also ==
- Collaboration during World War II
- Leon Rupnik
- Aloysius Stepinac
- Ivan Šarić (archbishop)
- Yugoslavia during the Second World War
- Slovenian Home Guard
- Persecution of Christians in the Eastern Bloc
- Anti-Catholicism
