= Anti-Communist Volunteer Militia =

Anti-Communist Volunteer Militia Milizia Volontaria Anti Comunista (MVAC)
- Active: 1941–1943
- Allegiance: Italy
- Type: Paramilitary
- Role: Anti-partisan guerrilla warfare
- Nicknames: Banda, Banda VAC
- Engagements: World War II

The Anti-Communist Volunteer Militia (Italian: Milizia Volontaria Anti Comunista, MVAC) (Note: Slovene: prostovoljna protikomunistična milica, also bela garda or belogardisti, pejorative, meaning 'white guard'; Serbo-Croatian: Добровољачка антикомунистичка милиција, ДАМ / Dobrovoljačka antikomunistička milicija, DAM) were paramilitary auxiliary formations of the Royal Italian Army composed of Yugoslav anti-Partisan groups in the Italian-annexed and occupied portions of the Kingdom of Yugoslavia during the Second World War.

Colloquially known as Bande or Bande VAC after the Italian military term for irregular forces normally composed of foreigners or natives, anti-communist MVAC formations in occupied Yugoslavia were composed mainly of anti-communist Slovenians, Serbs, Bosniaks, Croats and Montenegrins, as well as some Italians. As auxiliaries to regular Italian military units, MVAC units participated in guerrilla actions against communist Yugoslav Partisan forces in Slovenia, Dalmatia, Lika, Montenegro, Bosnia, and Herzegovina. Employed by the Italians from 1941 to 1943, Yugoslav MVAC units were utilized for their fighting ability and as well for their knowledge of the local language and terrain.

The MVAC lacked a clear conventional command and control structure and was to a greater extent a loose arrangement of disparate armed groups aligned in common interests to counter communist guerrillas in their respective areas of operations.

== Organization ==
Never technically a single or uniform organization, the name MVAC was used to designate a set of often different groups with varying statuses. Certain armed groups incorporated into the MVAC who had formed relationships with Italian officers were classified as "legalized bands", whereas groups that maintained occasional and less formal ties with Italian forces were classified as "non-legalized bands".

In northern Dalmatia for example, small groups of armed Serbian civilians and demobilized Yugoslav soldiers initially suspicious of invading Italian troops entered into discussions with Italian officials, who offered the Serbian minority refuge from marauding Croatian fascist Ustaša death squads. In Slovenia, the establishment of MVAC units was spurred by Slovenian Roman Catholic Bishop Rožman, who sent a letter to Italian General Mario Robotti in September 1942 proposing the creation of a Slovene collaborationist army and police force under Italian command to help fight communist Partisans and track down their supporters.

== History ==
Following the Axis invasion of Yugoslavia in April 1941, invading Italian forces enlisted the assistance of local irregular forces to fight against the local resistance organizations in Slovenia and the Independent State of Croatia. Formally established by the Italian–Croatian Roatta–Pavelić agreement of 19 June 1942, the first MVAC units of "legalized" Chetnik bande were set up on the territory of Italian-annexed Dalmatia on 23 June 1942. That same month, approximately 4,500 "legalized" Chetniks were recognized in Montenegro.

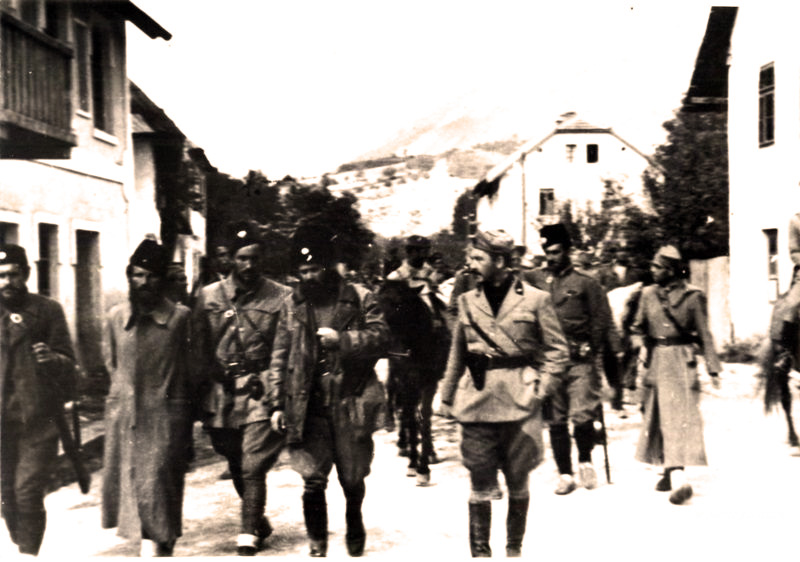
Serbian Chetniks and Italian officers entering Prozor, Bosnia, during Operation Alfa 1942

Between 1942 and 1943, MVAC groups in Italian-annexed parts of Dalmatia were equipped with arms, ammunition, and clothing by the Italians. According to Italian General Giacomo Zanussi, "legalized" Chetnik bande of the MVAC which were supplied with 30,000 rifles, 500 machine guns, 100 mortars, 15 pieces of artillery, 250,000 hand grenades, 7 million small arms rounds, and 7,000 to 8,000 pairs of shoes. By 28 February 1943, approximately 20,514 anti-communist MVAC auxiliaries were recorded by Italian authorities on the territory of the Independent State of Croatia and Montenegro.

=== Slovenia ===
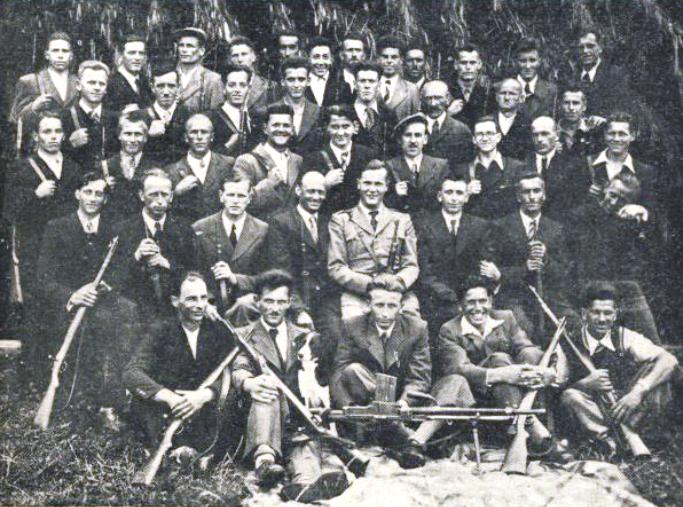
First unit of the Anti-Communist Volunteer Militia in Slovenia

In May 1942, the clandestine organization of the first Slovene anti-communist forces began in the Slovene capital of Ljubljana. In order to gain Italian endorsement for anti-Partisan operations, Slovenian MVAC groups were initially recruited from the local Sokol and National Legion organisations, followed later by members from Karl Novak's Slovenian Chetniks and Legion of Death regiment.

In the second half of July 1942, units of the Slovenian Legion of Death joined Italian forces during a major offensive against the communist Partisans. With actions that continued until early November, the Italians were impressed with the potential of such units and, with the approval of Benito Mussolini, they decided to accept the offer of the Slovenian authorities to enrol the anti-Partisan units as auxiliaries.

In early August 1942, the Italians directed that all existing and future Slovene anti-Partisan units would be incorporated into the MVAC. That same month, armed units in rural areas were formed into the Village Guards (Slovene: Vaške straže) and were included in the MVAC, ultimately becoming the largest grouping among the Italian auxiliaries.

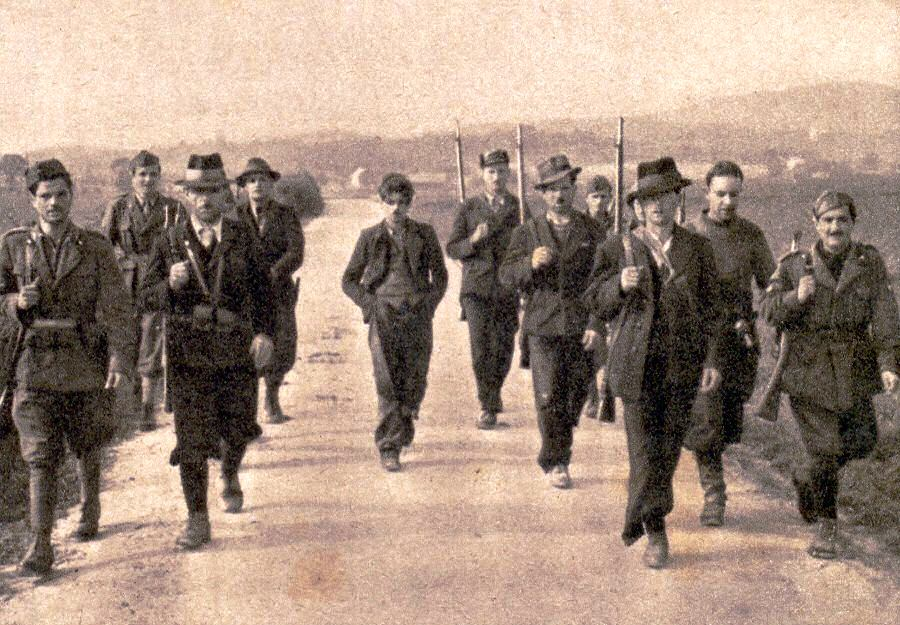
Slovenian MVAC Village Guards and Italian soldiers escorting a hostage

By the end of September 1942, Slovenian MVAC units numbered some 2,219 armed men, with each unit having one or more Italian liaison officers attached to it. During 1942, at the urging of the Slovene People's Party, around 600 former Royal Yugoslav Army prisoners-of-war (POWs) were released from Italian camps, returning to Slovenia and enlisting with MVAC auxiliaries. One of these former POWs was Lieutenant Colonel Ernest Peterlin, who upon his return to Slovenia was appointed to command the Ljubljana MVAC unit formed in October 1942. By November 1942, Slovenian MVAC units numbered 4,471 men under arms. While the MVAC included some members of the Sokol organization and many former POWs, the dominant force within it was the Slovene Legion and, through it, the Slovene People's Party.

By July 1943, the Slovenian MVAC numbered 6,134 men under it and some Italian officers, among them General Roatta, criticized their poor discipline. Observing that they "resembled goon-squads", Slovenian MVAC auxiliaries were viewed by their Italian sponsors as "insubordinate and rowdy". Speaking to Bishop Rožman in the autumn of 1942, Italian General Vittorio Ruggero warned Rožman: "I am not Slovenian, but this is how I see Slovenes and their struggle: the MVAC units help us Italians a lot ... but among you Slovenes they create such hatred that you will not be able to eliminate it for fifty years."

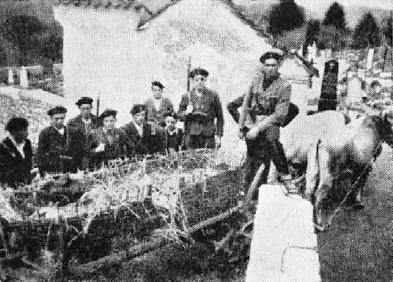
Slovenian MVAC Village Guards taking fallen Yugoslav Partisans to a cemetery

At the time that the Italians surrendered in 1943, the Italian forces numbered approximately 50,000 troops in Slovenia, assisted by 6,049 Slovenian MVAC soldiers and 300–400 Slovene Chetniks.

With the end of Italian rule in Slovenia, on 19 September 1943 Yugoslav Partisans and newly surrendered Italian soldiers laid siege to Turjak Castle 20 km southeast of Ljubljana. Encircled National Legion and Village Guard MVAC units along with Slovenian Chetnik forces were beaten by communist forces thanks to heavy weapons that they had acquired from Italian forces. After the battle of Turjak Castle all the anti-communist Slovenian forces joined the German collaborationist guard known as Domobranci (Heimwehr) merging with formations already created in the German-annexed Slovenian territories of Carinthia and Carniola.

At the end of the Second World War, many former MVAC fighters were captured and held captive by the Allies in Austria. Later many were handed over to Tito's army in the Bleiburg repatriations, and most were killed.

== Units ==
MVAC Units in Italian Service, February 28, 1943
Unit	Orthodox	Catholics	Muslims	Total	Units	Divisions
V Army Corps	4,313			4,313	20	Lombardia 2, Re 18
VI Army Corps	8,385	511	780	9,676	22	Marche 6, Messina 2, Murge 14
XVII Army Corps	7,816	321		8,137	21	Sassari 17, Bergamo 4
Total (occupied zone)	20,514	832	780	22,126		
Slovenia (XI A.C.)				5,145	40	Isonzo, Cacciatori delle Alpi, Frontier Guards
Dalmatia (XVIII A.C.)				882	13	
Kotor (VI A.C.)				1,474	3	
Total (annexed zone)				7,501		
Grand total				29,627		

== See also ==
- Slovene Home Guard
- Blue Guard (Slovene)
- Black Hand (Slovenia)
- Slovenian National Defense Corps
- 2nd Army (Italy)
- Governorate of Dalmatia
- Bombing of Zadar in World War II
- Bands (Italian Army irregulars)
