= Siege of Turjak =

1943 battle during World War II

- Part of World War II in Yugoslavia
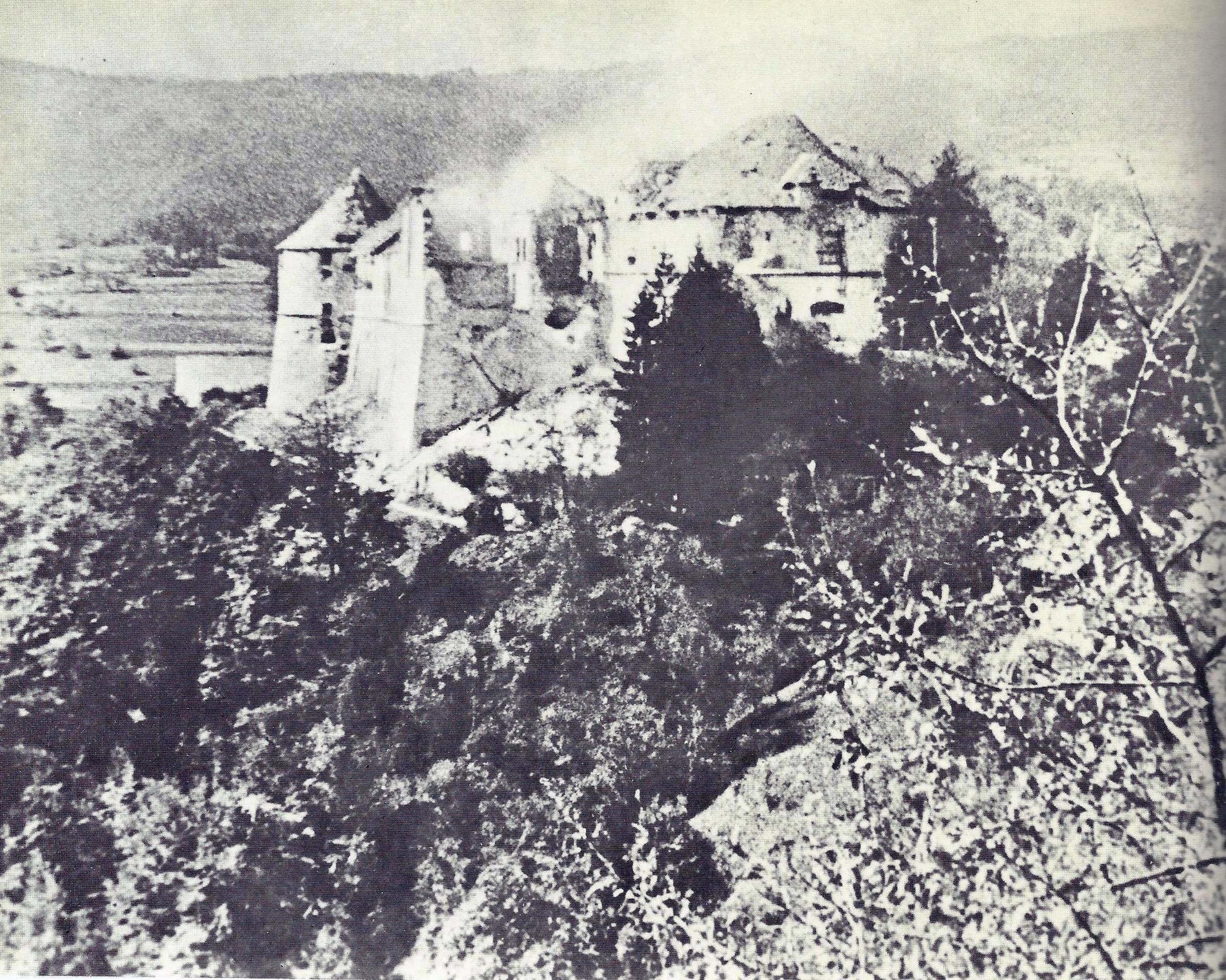
- Turjak castle in flames following the battle, 19 September 1943
Date	14–19 September 1943 (6 days)
Location	Turjak Castle, Province of Ljubljana (now Slovenia) 45.8767°N 14.6079°E
Result	Partisan victory

Belligerents
Slovene Partisans	Former Anti-Communist Volunteer Militia (MVAC); Slovene Chetniks

Units involved
Prešern Brigade	White Guard (Former MVAC); Civic Guard (Former MVAC); Legion of Death (Former MVAC); Blue Guard (Chetniks)

Strength
	650–700

Casualties and losses
Unknown	20–30 killed
- 115–1,000 POWs killed in aftermath

The siege of Turjak or Battle of Turjak (Slovene: bitka za Turjak) was fought between 14 and 19 September 1943 at the Turjak Castle between the Slovene Partisans and the combined forces of Slovene former units of the Anti-Communist Volunteer Militia (MVAC) and Slovene Chetniks. The battle followed the Partisan victory at Battle of Grčarice. Partisans encircled the Turjak castle on 14 September and laid siege to the castle after the defenders refused to surrender. The siege ended on 19 September with a Partisan victory, in part due to the heavy weapons that they had acquired from Italian forces.

== Prelude ==
On 3 September 1943, an armistice was signed between the Kingdom of Italy and Allied powers. The withdrawal of Italy from the war led to an immediate destabilisation of the Balkan region with Axis forces overrunning previously held Italian positions. The surrender of Italian forces put the Anti-partisan units of the MVAC and Chetniks in a predicament, without the protection and support of Italian troops, they were now in a position of being overrun by Partisan forces. Anti-partisan forces were hopeful of an Allied landing on the Istria coast; however, reinforcements never came. The situation for Anti-partisan forces became dire after the Partisans acquired a large arsenal of weaponry from surrendering Italian troops including ammunition, tanks and howitzers.

== Battle ==
The MVAC and Chetniks were hopeful reinforcements would arrive and began to set up defensive position in the village of Grčarice, Zapotok and the Turjak castle. However, a lack of communication between the units meant that they would fight as individual units, rather than as a cohesive unit. The units stationed at the Turjak castle believed the medieval walls would withstand attacks from the Partisans.

On 10 September 1943, Anti-partisan forces were overrun in the village of Grčarice. This victory allowed the Partisans to turn their attention to the Turjak castle where they completed the encirclement on 14 September 1943. After refusing an ultimatum to surrender, Partisan forces attacked the besieged MVAC and Chetnik units. After six days of fighting, the Anti-partisan units were overrun in due to the heavy weaponry available to the Partisans that destroyed the defensive fortifications of the Turjak castle.

== Aftermath ==
The Partisans captured a reported 1,200 prisoners of war from Grčarice, Zapotok and Turjak. Although Partisan data listed 115 sentenced to death, and noted that some were killed while fleeing, estimations of victims are higher. Tomasevich claim up to 1,000 killed.

== Sources ==
- Gregor Joseph Kranjc (2013). To Walk with the Devil: Slovene Collaboration and Axis Occupation, 1941-1945. University of Toronto Press. ISBN 978-1-4426-1330-0.
- Antonio J. Munoz (1998). Slovenian Axis Forces in World War II, 1941-1945. Axis Europa. ISBN 978-1-891227-12-7.
- Tomasevich, Jozo (2001). War and Revolution in Yugoslavia, 1941–1945: Occupation and Collaboration. Stanford: Stanford University Press. ISBN 978-0-8047-3615-2.
- France Grum; Stane Pleško (1961). Svoboda v razvzlinah: Grčarice, Turjak, Kočevje. Zgodovinski odsek Zveze slovenskih protikomunističnih borcev.
