= Battle of Grčarice =

1943 WWII battle in occupied Yugoslavia

- Part of World War II
| Date | 7–10 September 1943 |
| Location | Grčarice, German occupied Yugoslavia, modern-day Slovenia 45°39′5.78″N 14°45′20.02″E |
| Result | Partisan victory |

Belligerents
| Slovene Chetniks | Slovene Partisans |

Commanders and leaders
| Karl Novak; Danilo Borut Koprivica; Pavle Vošmar Vidmar; Milan Kranjc Kajtimar | Jaka Avšič; Vinko Šumrada-Radoš |

Units involved
| Blue Guard: Dolenjska Chetnik Detachment; Ljubljana Chetnik Detachment | 14th Slovenian Division: 1st Shock Brigade "Tone Tomšič"; 2nd Shock Brigade "Ljubo Šercer"; 3rd Shock Brigade "Ivan Gradnik" artillery battery of 2 guns |

Strength
| 350 | 2,000 |

Casualties and losses
| Complete annihilation: 10 †; 120–171 POW, almost all killed after Kočevje trial or without any trial | Unknown |
- Location within Yugoslavia

The Battle of Grčarice was fought in early September 1943 between the Slovene Partisans and the Blue Guard. The battle was waged in Grčarice in German-occupied Yugoslavia, modern-day Slovenia.

== Background ==
The capitulation of Italy was an important turning point in the World War II in Slovenian part of Axis occupied Kingdom of Yugoslavia. Slovene Partisans had a British mission inside their headquarter. Based on the instructions received from the Allies, the Italian troops were ordered to surrender their arms to the Partisans in Yugoslavia, which allowed Slovene Partisans to significantly strengthen their forces. The Slovene Partisans immediately used this arms to eliminate their main political opponents, Slovenian detachment of the Yugoslav Army in Homeland.

== Forces ==
=== National Liberation Army and Partisan Detachments of Slovenia ===
Slovene Partisans which attacked Yugoslav Army in Grčarice belonged to three shock brigades (Tomšič, Šercer and Gradnik) of the 14th Slovenian Division. After the capitulation of Italy in 1943 the Slovene Partisans captured 2 heavy guns together with its crew that they brought to Grčarice. According to an interview of former Chetnik officer Uroš Šušterič, the Italian soldiers operated artillery weapons used against Chetniks.

=== Slovenian Chetniks ===
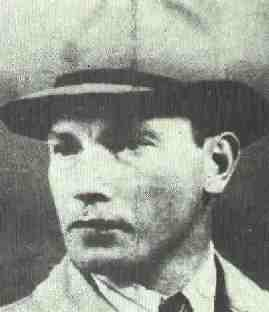
Karl Novak in the 1930s, commander of all Chetnik detachments in Slovenia

The commander of all Chetniks in Slovenia was Karl Novak. Most of Slovene Chetniks in Grčarice were members of the Sokol movement. Chetnik detachment in Grčarice was the main Slovene Chetnik group. Their number grew from 50 initially to 350. Their official name was Dolenjska Chetnik Detachment while they were also known as the Central Chetnik Detachment (Slovene: Centralni Četniški Odred) About 60 of them were officers or non-commissioned officers. Dolenjska Chetnik Detachment was commanded by the Major Danilo Borut Koprivica. It had four battalions, the first commanded by Captain Pavle Vošmar Vidmar, the second by Milan Kranjc, third by Marjan Strniša and fourth by Stanko Abram.

Chetniks in Grčarice expected reinforcements consisting of Chetniks from Ljubljana and around 300 Chetniks from Lika region. Only small detachment of 20 Chetniks from Ljubljana managed to reach Grčarice and reinforce defenders. One detachment of 270 Chetniks from Lika commanded by Vasilije Marović was sent by Major Bjelajac to join Chetniks in Slovenia, tried to reach Grčarice, but returned after reaching Srbske Moravice where they learned about the Italian capitulation and decided to return.

== Battle ==
The prelude of the Battle of Grčarice were the clashes between the Partisans and Chetniks in Sveti Gregor on 3 September. After being attacked by the Tone Tomšič Partisan Brigade, the Chetnik forces retreated to Grčarice, where they had their center and headquarters. The Chetniks immediately fortified their positions connecting two buildings and the church. On 5 September Chetniks received two trucks of arms and ammunition from Italian occupying forces, because Italian General Gambara wanted to establish connection with the Allies.

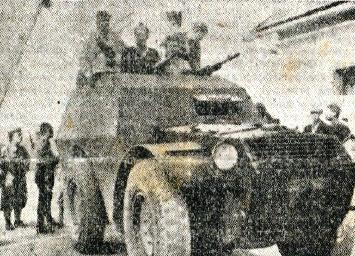
Partisans from Šercer brigade near Kočevje in September 1943

On 6 September the Chetniks in Grčarice celebrated the birthday of Peter II of Yugoslavia.

On 7 September, the Partisans encircled Grčarice and on 8 September they began the attack on Grčarice. On the first day of attack the Slovene Partisans did not have any heavy weapons, so Chetniks successfully repelled all their attacks.

Major Novak was in Ljubljana during this battle and commanded his units through radio connection. Expecting the reinforcement from Chetniks from Lika, he continually sent instructions to Dolenjska Chetniks Detachment to keep their positions. When Koprivica was wounded he appointed Captain Milan Kranjc to take over the command over the detachment. On 9 September 20 Chetniks of the Ljubljana detachment joined surrounded Chetniks.

When Kranjc realized that the Chetnik units could not withheld the Partisan's attacks, he planned to break through their lines during the night. In midnight Kranjc shouted to Partisans explaining them that their political commissars were guilty of crimes against Slovenian people and accusing them of attacking regular Yugoslav army units instead of the Nazi troops that occupied their country. Kranjc invited the Partisan soldiers to kill their political commissars and join the Chetniks in their struggle against occupation. When Kranjc was wounded by Partisan artillery fire, Marijan Strniša (nom de guerre Pribina) took command over the surrounded Chetnik forces.

According to post-war Yugoslav sources, both Koprivica and Kranjc committed suicide to avoid capture by the Partisans.

The forces of Yugoslav Army in the Homeland suffered a defeat, and with 11 soldiers killed and 171 captured.

According to Vladimir Dedijer, the Partisans occupied Grčarice on 9 September 1943. Among the Chetniks captured by the Partisans was Vladimir Kalan, who worked for Allied intelligence and was released after he claimed British citizenship.

== Kočevje trials ==
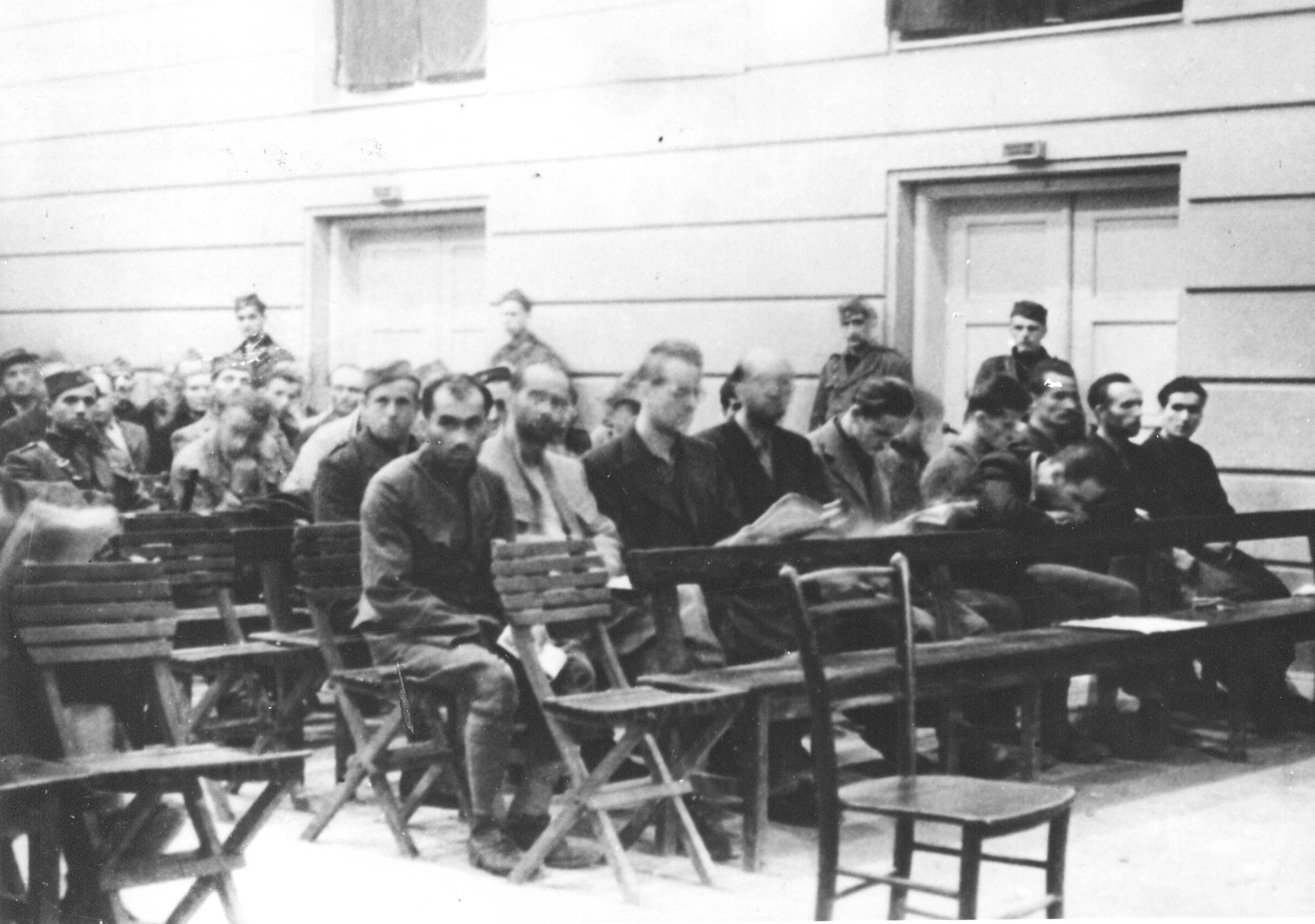
Kočevje trials organized in former hall of Sokol assotiations between 9 and 11 October 1943.

The Liberation Front of the Slovene Nation organized trials for captured Yugoslav soldiers between 9 and 11 October 1943. The Liberation Front of the Slovene Nation organized a trial to 21 captured Yugoslav officers, condemning to death 16 of them while 5 were sentenced to forced labor.

Besides nine prisoners who escaped and those who were put on trial and sentenced to death, all other prisoners were secretly executed in November and December 1943 on many different places in Kočevje although they surrendered after Partisans guaranteed their lives which was a condition for their surrender.

== Aftermath ==
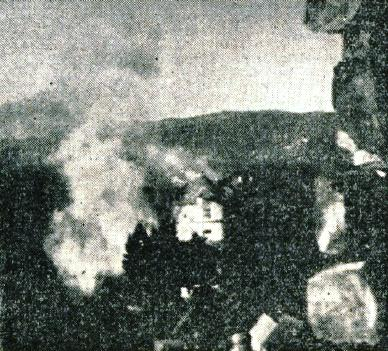
The image taken during the Siege of Turjak

On 19 September 1943 around 700 members of Slovenian detachments of Yugoslav Army in the Homeland surrendered to Slovene Partisans in Turjak Castle after the Siege of Turjak.

Slovenian historian Janez Grum emphasized that the defeat of Chetniks in three day battle of Grčarice was serious blow for anti-communist Slovenians and their resistance to communist terror.

After the defeat in Grčarice only small scattered groups of Chetniks in Slovenia continued to exist, while Major Novak resigned as their commander. Dragoslav Mihailović appointed Ivan Prezelj as new commander of the Slovenian units of the Yugoslav Army in the Homeland. Prezelj commanded over small number of Chetnik detachments until the end of the World War II.

The Slovene Home Guard was established as a reaction to massacres and inadmissible actions of Partisans connected with battles of Turjak and Grčarice.

== Legacy ==
In his postwar work, Edvard Kardelj recounted that, until the capitulation of Italy and destruction of the Slovenian detachment of the Yugoslav Army in the Homeland in Grčarice, Joseph Stalin had insisted that the Chetniks and Partisans should "reach an agreement at any price ... in order to create an army under the command of Draža Mihailović."

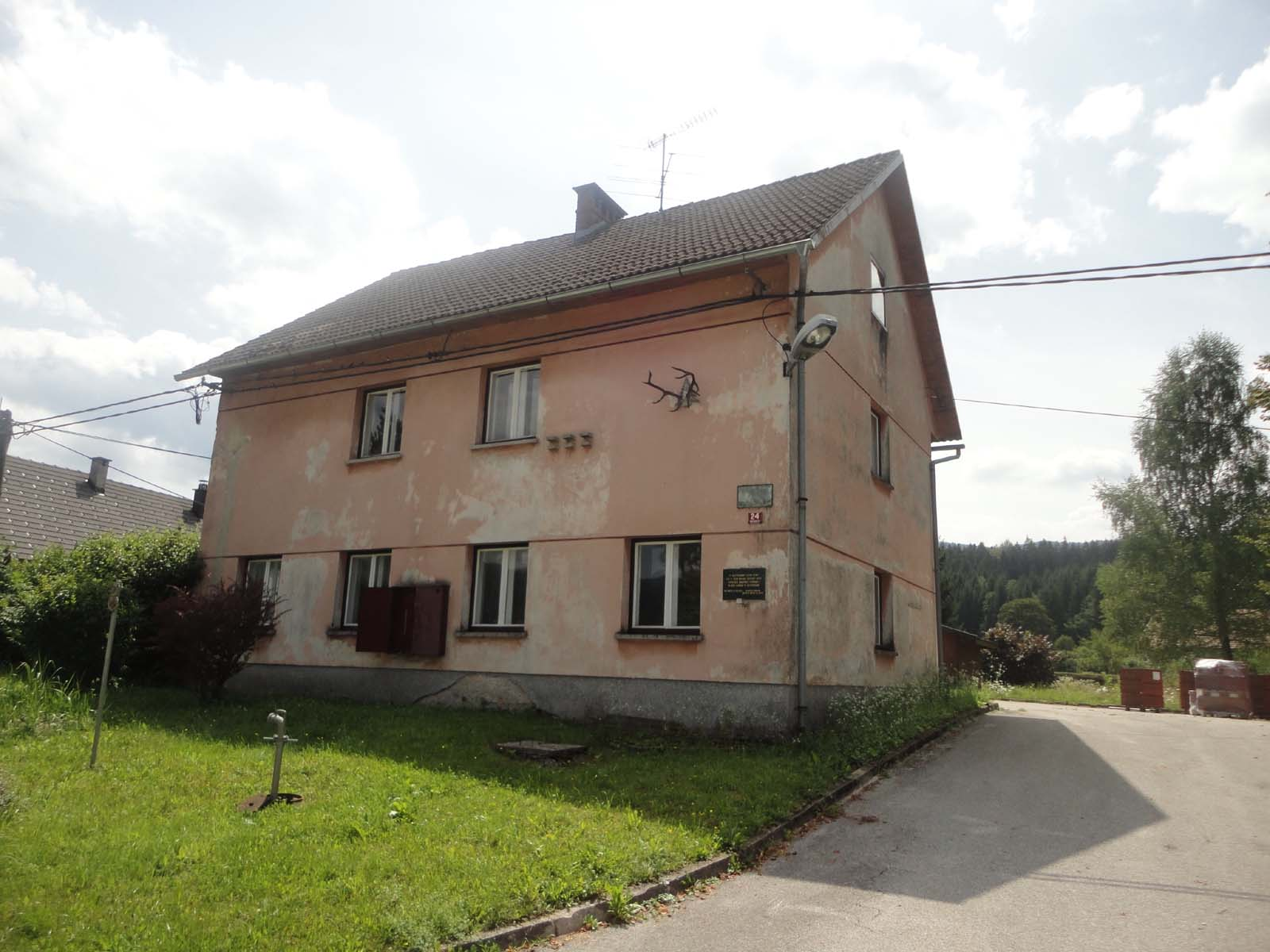
2011 picture of the repaired building in Grčarice where the Chetniks had their headquarters during the Battle of Grčarice, with a commemorative plaque in honour of the Chetniks

== Sources ==
- Terzić, Velimir (1957). Oslobodilacki rat naroda Jugoslavije 1941-1945. Vojni istoriski Institut Jugoslovenske narodne armije.
- Mlakar, Boris (2003). Slovensko domobranstvo, 1943-1945: ustanovitev, organizacija, idejno ozadje. Slovenska matica. ISBN 978-961-213-114-2.
- Bevc, Vladislav (2007). Liberal Forces in Twentieth Century Yugoslavia: Memoirs of Ladislav Bevc. Peter Lang. ISBN 978-1-4331-0008-6.
- Dedijer, Vladimir (1990). From September 11, 1943, to November 7, 1944. University of Michigan Press. ISBN 978-0-472-10110-8.
- Dežman, Jože; Štepec, Marko; Cregeen, Martin (2006). The Making of Slovenia. National Museum of Contemporary History. ISBN 978-961-91040-2-6.
- Plut-Pregelj, Leopoldina; Rogel, Carole (2010). The A to Z of Slovenia. Rowman & Littlefield. ISBN 978-0-8108-7216-5.
- Saje, Franček (1952). Belogardizem. Slovenski knjižni zavod.
- Milač, Metod M. (2002). Resistance, Imprisonment, and Forced Labor. P. Lang. ISBN 978-0-8204-5781-9.
- Kardelj, Edvard (1982). Reminiscences--the Struggle for Recognition and Independence the New Yugoslavia, 1944-1957. Blond & Briggs. ISBN 978-0-85634-135-9.
- Švajncer, Janez J. (1992). Vojna in vojaška zgodovina Slovencev. Prešernova družba.
- Griesser-Pečar, Tamara (2007). Razdvojeni narod: Slovenija 1941-1945 : okupacija, kolaboracija, državljanska vojna, revolucija. Mladinska knj. ISBN 978-961-01-0208-3.
- Luthar, Oto (2008). The Land Between: A History of Slovenia. Peter Lang. ISBN 978-3-631-57011-1.
- Grum, France; Pleško, Stane (1961). Svoboda v razvzlinah: Grčarice, Turjak, Kočevje. Zgodovinski odsek Zveze slovenskih protikomunističnih borcev.
- Ravnikar-Podbevšek, Štefanija (1972). Sv. Urh: Kronika dogodkov iz narodnoosvobodilne vojne. Borec.
- Javoršek, Jože (1990). Spomini na Slovence. ADIT.
