= Legion of Death =

Legion of Death may refer to:

- The Legion of Death, a 1918 American drama film directed by Tod Browning.
- Legion of Death (military unit), a Slovenian anti-Communist militia in the Second World War.
