= Prezelj =

Prezelj is a Slovene surname. Notable people with the surname include:

- Annamaria Prezelj (born 1997), Slovene basketball player
- Ivan Prezelj (1895–1973), Yugoslav military officer
- Marko Prezelj (born 1965), Slovene mountaineer
- Rožle Prezelj (born 1979), Slovene high jumper
