= Jože Melaher =

Yugoslav military officer

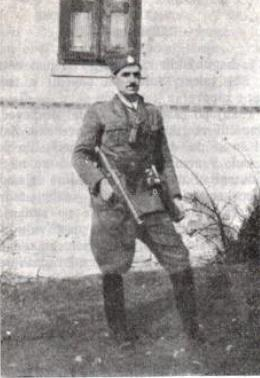
- Melaher in 1945
- Born: February 26, 1913; Zrkovcih na Pobrežju, Maribor, Austria-Hungary (modern-day Slovenia)
- Died: October 6, 1991 (aged 78); Cleveland, Ohio, United States
- Military career
- Allegiance: Yugoslavia (1941–45)
- Service: Chetniks
- Nickname: Pepek
- Unit: Štajerska Chetnik Detachment of Blue Guard (Slovene)

Jože Melaher - Zmagoslav (1913–1991) was Yugoslav military officer, most notable for being commander of Chetnik Štajerska detachment during the World War II.

== Early life ==
Melaher was born in Zrkovcih na Pobrežju, on 26 February 1913 from father Leopold and mother Apolonija, née name Klemenčič. Melaher's older brother Anton remained after the war on the farm. Joze finished gymnasium, then worked as a teacher and a staff member. In 1937 he married Marija Vrecl, a teacher with whom he had three daughters later in the emigration. After serving a military service in the army of the Kingdom of Yugoslavia, he held the rank of reserve sergeant. Before the World War II Melaher was active member of Slovenian Catholic youth organizations and Slovene People's Party.

== During World War II ==
All Chetniks were considered as enemies by Axis occupiers Yugoslavia who managed to reach quid pro quo arrangements with Chetniks, that allowed them to fight against communist revolutionary irregular forces. In Slovenia, Mehaler and his detachment were exemption from that kind of arrangement. According to some estimates, Štajerska Chetnik detachment was the only anti-Communist military unit that consistently attacked Axis occupiers throughout the war. The detachment under Melaher's command had 200 men. In October 1942 Gestapo arrested Melaher, but he managed to escape and continued his struggle. Melaher successfully recruited many of his men among Slovenian deserters from German units.

This Chetnik unit led by Melaher operated against German troops in the region of Haloze and Ptuj. According to one report of Yugoslav communist forces, Melaher's Chetnik detachment and operated in the region of Lenart v Slovenskih Goricah. Melaher's Chetnik detachment received British supplies as airdrops until 1944 and published resistance newspaper Blood and Land (Slovene: Kri in zemlja). Melaher was author of most of its texts.

In April 1945 Chetniks from Melahers Štajerska detachment were put under command of Ivan Prezelj and enlisted as part of the Slovenian People's Army. In 1945 Melaher signed an cease-fire agreement with German occupying forces.

== After World War II ==
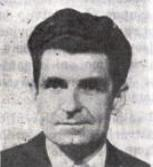
Melaher in 1965

With some members of his detachment he escaped ahead of the arrival of the Soviet Red Army and Yugoslav Communist forces. He first settled in Italy, and later in the United States. Melaher died on 10 June 1991, in Cleveland, Ohio.

== Sources ==
- Kranjc, Gregor J. (22 February 2013). To Walk with the Devil: Slovene Collaboration and Axis Occupation, 1941-1945. University of Toronto Press. ISBN 978-1-4426-6053-3.
- Plut-Pregelj, Leopoldina; Kranjc, Gregor; Lazarević, Žarko (22 February 2018). Historical Dictionary of Slovenia. Rowman & Littlefield. ISBN 978-1-5381-1106-2.
- Griesser-Pečar, Tamara (2007). Razdvojeni narod: Slovenija 1941-1945 : okupacija, kolaboracija, državljanska vojna, revolucija. Mladinska knj. ISBN 978-961-01-0208-3.
- Škofljanec, Andreja Klasinc (2006). Vodnik po arhivskem gradivu Studia Slovenica. ARS. ISBN 9789616638012.
- Rant, Jože (2008). Slovenski eksodus leta 1945. Selbstverl. ISBN 978-987-24162-1-8.
