= Ivan Prezelj =

Yugoslav military officer and commander of Blue Guard

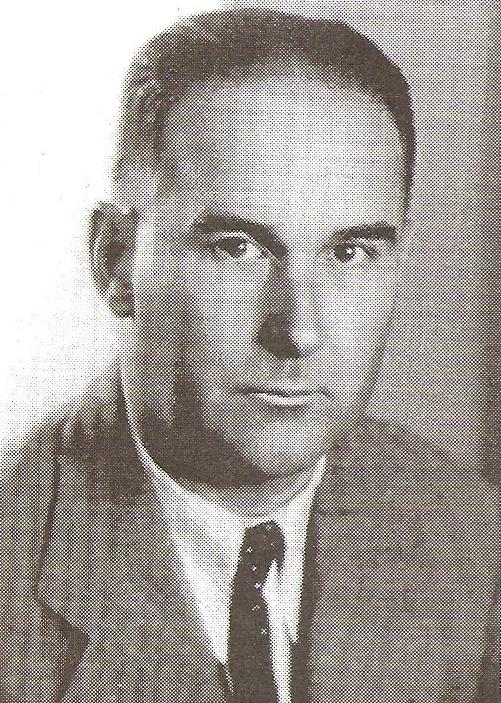
- Prezelj in 1930s
- Born: 29 August 1895; Nova Vas, Istria, Austria-Hungary
- Died: 22 April 1973 (aged 77); Cleveland, Ohio, United States
- Military career
- Allegiance: Austria-Hungary; * Kingdom of Yugoslavia
- Nickname: General Andrej (Serbian: Ђенерал Андреј) or Andrej Račić
- Unit: Blue Guard (Slovene)
- Conflicts: Battle of Grčarice

Ivan Prezelj (29 August 1895 – 22 April 1973) was a Yugoslav military officer and commander of Blue Guard, a detachment of Yugoslav Army in the Fatherland in German-occupied Slovenia during the World War II.

Before the Second World War, Prezelj was the Yugoslav military attache in Prague.

Prezelj was initially subordinated to Major Karl Novak and Colonel Vladimir Vauhnik. After the defeat in the Battle of Grčarice, Major Novak resigned and Prezelj was appointed in his place by Draža Mihailović. Mihailović promoted Prezelj to the rank of General on 29 June or 1 December 1944. The headquarter of Prezelj was with Notranjska Detachment and Soča Detachments.

Prezelj in Ljubljana met with Dimitrije Ljotić and Momčilo Đujić in 1945. In April 1945 Prezelj was appointed as commander of Slovenian People's Army while Mirko Bitanc was appointed as his deputy.

After the World War II Prezelj escaped from Yugoslav authorities to Italy.

== Sources ==
- Bevc, Ladislav (2006). Spomini. Založništvo Jutro. ISBN 978-961-6433-71-6.
- Plut-Pregelj, Leopoldina; Kranjc, Gregor; Lazarević, Žarko (22 February 2018). Historical Dictionary of Slovenia. Rowman & Littlefield. ISBN 978-1-5381-1106-2.
- Krivic, Vladimir (1970). Ljubljana v ilegali: Do zloma okupatorjev. Okrajni odbor Socialistične zveze delovnega ljudstva.
- Griesser-Pečar, Tamara (2007). Razdvojeni narod: Slovenija 1941-1945 : okupacija, kolaboracija, državljanska vojna, revolucija. Mladinska knj. ISBN 978-961-01-0208-3.
- Rebić, Đuro (1987). Špijuni, diverzanti, teroristi: ostaci kontrarevolucije u Jugoslaviji. Centar za informacije i publicitet. ISBN 978-86-7125-009-2.
- Jelić-Butić, Fikreta (1986). Četnici u Hrvatskoj, 1941-1945. Globus. ISBN 9788634300109.
- Nose, Aleš (2008). Domobranci zdravo - Bog daj: protikomunistične enote na Slovenskem 1942-1945. Modrijan. ISBN 978-961-241-223-4.
