= Jaka Avšič =

Slovene diplomat and political commissar (1896–1978)

Lieutenant General Jakob Avšić
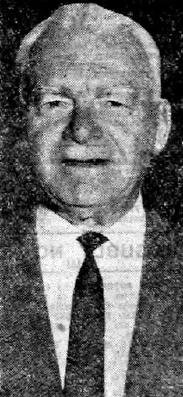
- Avšič in 1966
- Born: April 24, 1896; Ljubljana, Duchy of Carniola, Austria-Hungary
- Died: January 2, 1978 (aged 81)
- Military career
- Awards

Jakob "Jaka" Avšič (nom de guerre Branko Hrast) (24 April 1896 – 2 January 1978) was the first commander of Chetnik units (Plava garda) in Slovenia during the Second World War. At the end of October 1941, Colonel Avšič and Major Karl Novak went to Ravna Gora and met with Draža Mihailović, who appointed Avšič as his representative in Slovenia. Avšič soon deserted the Yugoslav Royal Army in the Fatherland and joined the Yugoslav Partisans. He was then instructed by the Communist executive board to try to convince other Yugoslav army officers to desert and join the Partisans. During the war he used the pseudonym Branko Hrast.

== Sources ==
- Pirjevec, Jože (22 May 2018). Tito and His Comrades. University of Wisconsin Press. ISBN 978-0-299-31770-6.
- Крањц, Маријан Ф (2006). Plava garda: zaupno poročilo četniškega vojvode in generalštabnega polkovnika Karla I. Novaka, poveljnika slovenskih četnikov. Pro-Andy. ISBN 978-961-91794-3-7.
- Rant, Jože (2008). Slovenski eksodus leta 1945. Selbstverl. ISBN 978-987-24162-1-8.
