= Lambert Ehrlich =

Carinthian Slovene Roman Catholic priest and ethnologist

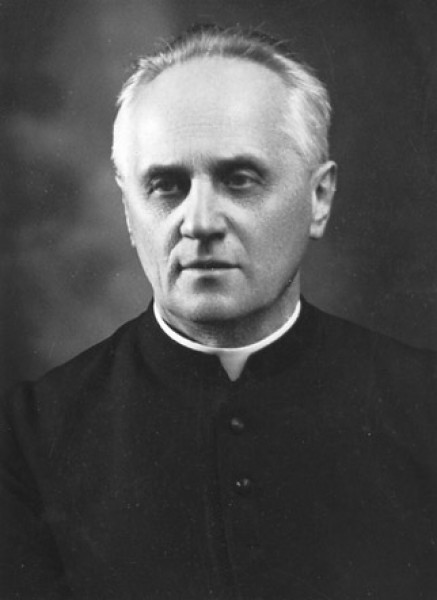
- Lambert Ehrlich

Orders
- Ordination: 1903

Personal details
- Born: Lambert Ehrlich; 18 September 1878 Saifnitz (now Camporosso in Valcanale), Tarvisio, Austria-Hungary
- Died: 26 May 1942 (aged 63) Ljubljana, Axis-occupied Yugoslavia
- Denomination: Roman Catholic

Lambert Ehrlich (18 September 1878 – 26 May 1942) was a Carinthian Slovene Roman Catholic priest, political figure, and ethnologist.

== Early life and education ==
Ehrlich was born in the hamlet of Saifnitz in the Canal Valley (Slovene: Žabnice) in the town of Tarvisio, then part of the Duchy of Carinthia (now Camporosso in Italy). He attended secondary school in Klagenfurt and then studied theology in Innsbruck (1897–1902) and in Rome (1903). He was ordained a priest in 1903 and also received a doctorate in Innsbruck that year.

== Work ==
Ehrlich first served as a curate in Villach, and then as a cathedral curate in Klagenfurt (1903–1907), an episcopal secretary (1907–1910), and a professor of theology in the University of Klagenfurt (1910–1919). He was a leading figure in Catholic education in Carinthia.

After World War I, southern Carinthia became a contested region between the Austrian Republic and the Kingdom of Serbs, Croats and Slovenes; because of his familiarity with the situation in the region and his ethnographic knowledge, Ehrlich was appointed to the Yugoslav delegation to the Paris Peace Conference in 1919. He continued his studies in ethnology and comparative religion at the Sorbonne and in Oxford in 1920 and 1921. In 1922 he became a full professor of comparative religion at the Faculty of Theology of the University of Ljubljana, a position that he held until his death. He wrote numerous books and articles about the religious customs of the Australian Aborigines and about various ethnological and theological issues.

Ehrlich worked in various church organizations. He was a church representative for the Slovenian High School Students’ Union (Slovene: Slovenska dijaška zveza), the Academic Union (Akademska zveza), the Straža Catholic students’ club, and the Marian Congregation of Academics. He became the ideologue of the Straža club and edited the club’s magazine Straža v viharju (Sentinel in the Storm). The club and its Straža magazine achieved notoriety for its admiration of fascism, as well as antisemitism, equating Jews with both western capitalist excesses and the Bolshevik revolution

== Second World War ==
After the invasion of Yugoslavia in April 1941, on 24 November that year Ehrlich proposed a political program known as the Slovenian Issue (Slovenski problem) for an independent Slovenian state to the non-communist political parties; however, it was not accepted.

Ehrlich was a staunch anti-communist and anti-Semite. During the war he campaigned against "Jewish Satanism" which he maintained was trying to get its hands on other people's national treasuries. On 1 April 1942 he sent the Italian occupation authorities a memorandum in which he analyzed the current position of the Partisans and offered proposals for how to destroy them. In it, he suggested that the Italians arm the Slovenian police and that the Slovenians establish a semi-autonomous security service under Italian military supervision. He also suggested that the Italian authorities release innocent people held in prisons and camps, assist in rebuilding destroyed villages, and allow greater freedom of the press to promote anti-communist propaganda.

Ehrlich was assassinated by the communist Security and Intelligence Service (Varnostno-obvescevalna sluzba, VOS) on 26 May 1942. He was shot in front of the soup kitchen on Shooting Range Street (Streliška ulica) in Ljubljana by Franc Stadler (a.k.a. Pepe) (1915–2000), who also assassinated Marko Natlačen and was named a Yugoslav People’s Hero. After the war, the Communist authorities desecrated Ehrlich’s grave, exhumed his remains, and disposed of them at an unknown location.

== Bibliography ==
- Svete Višarje. Klagenfurt: Slovenska kršč.-soc. “Zveza” za Koroško, 1910 COBISS 1926189
- Dr. Aigner und Lourdes. Klagenfurt: Schriftleitung des “Kärntner Tagblattes,” 1914 COBISS 513787532
- Katoliška Cerkev, kraljestvo božje na zemlji. Klagenfurt: Družba sv. Mohorja, 1919-1927 COBISS 2724611
- La question du Prekmurje, de la Styrie et de la Carinthie. La Carinthie; Paris: Imprimerie “Graphique”, 1919 (coauthor) COBISS 1001805
- Origin of Australian Beliefs. St. Gabriel - Mödling (Vienna): Anthropos administration, 1922 COBISS 52236032
- Slovenska misijonarja Baraga in Knoblehar. Ljubljana: “Unio Cleri,” 1928 COBISS 3373571
- Razvoj etnologije in njene metode v zadnjih desetletjih = Le développement de l'ethnologie et ses méthodes au dernier temps. Ljubljana, 1929 COBISS 512274229
- Na sveti poti: višarski molitvenik. Gorizia: Svetovišarsko svetišče, 1931 COBISS 4214578
- Indijske šole. Ljubljana: Bengalski misijon D. J., 1938 COBISS 64168448
- Parijci. Ljubljana: Bengalski misijon D. J., 1939 COBISS 64216320
- Apologetika: osnovno bogoslovje. Ljubljana: author, 193? COBISS 5747459
- Lambert Ehrlich: Pariška mirovna konferenca in Slovenci 1919/20 / Ehrlichova spomenica za Vatikan 14. aprila 1942. Lambert Ehrlich za slovenski narod. Ljubljana: Inštitut za zgodovino Cerkve pri Teološki fakulteti Univerze, 2002 COBISS 3740000
- Luca Pignataro, La Slovenia tra primo Novecento e secondo dopoguerra, in “Nuova Storia Contemporanea”, XIII, 1(2009), pp. 11–30 (Italian)
