= Black Hand (Slovenia) =

Anti-communist organization active during World War II

- Leader: Unknown
- Dates active: 1943–1945
- Allegiance: Slovene Home Guard (disputed)
- Active regions: Slovenia
- Ideology: Anti-communism; Clerical fascism (alleged)
- Size: Unknown
- Wars: Second World War

The Black Hand (Slovene: Črna roka) was a secret anti-communist organisation active in the Slovene Lands during World War II. It conducted assassinations of members of the Liberation Front of the Slovene Nation and Slovene Partisans. The organization's main goal was the elimination of "communism and its proponents". It is often regarded as associated with the Catholic Church and Slovene Home Guard.

== Background ==
The historic record regarding the Black Hand is sparse. Sources originating in the Yugoslav period often bear strong ideological condemnatory undertones. The Black Hand is sometimes referred to as the "Slovene Gestapo" (and possibly collaborated with the Gestapo in some instances, though to what extent, if any, is uncertain). Its name may have been derived from a "Serbian military tradition".

The organization's activities commenced in the autumn of 1943 with its first acts carried out in Jesenice, and Bled region. Its activities in Ljubljana began in March 1944 and later spread to other regions as well. Some sources trace the Black Hand's inception to a February 1944 meeting of various anti-Partisan and Nazi leaders that allegedly took place in Trieste.

The Black Hand was likely not connected to the German occupying forces, which were often exasperated by the anarchic and unsupervised nature of Black Hand's activities and purportedly often demanded reports of its activities or even arrested and interrogated its operatives after the killings.

Members were often young and pious men from a rural background who likely joined the group due to the influence of local religious authorities. Members were often also associated with the Slovene Home Guard, Chetniks, and clerical groups. Black Hand justified its actions as a defense of religion/faith.

After the war, many former Black Hand members evaded arrest and escaped, though some were convicted and sentenced to death.

== Killings ==
Black Hand operatives usually carried out assassinations by breaking into victims' houses at night, sometimes executing the targets in front of their families. Victims were often killed in their beds, or were first led away under the pretense of being taken to an interrogation. The corpses were then often mutilated beyond recognition and thrown into Ljubljanica or Sava rivers. According to some accounts, the assassins used police cars during their activities. The assassins were often clad in black clothes, or, sometimes, Partisan uniforms, and often concealed their faces. The assassins often left behind leaflets with a print of a black hand, or impressed a black hand print on a wall, and left messages that blamed victims' alleged support for communism as the reason for the killing, and exalted the ideals of nation and faith. Common "mottos" included "Death to the Liberation Front!" (Slovene: "Smrt OF!"), and "You escaped once, you won't the second time. Death to communism!" (Slovene: "Enkrat si ušel, drugič ne boš. Smrt komunizmu!"). The organization may have had police and Home Guard informants.

Victims were often suspected members or supporters of the Liberation Front (sometimes eminent individuals) whose connection with the group could not be proven. Black Hand also carried out torture, intimidation, interrogations, and the surreptitious killings of Slovene Home Guard's prisoners, which formally had to be handed over to the German occupying forces after their apprehension and interrogation. Germans usually deported their POWs to concentration camps, while the Home Guard desired a more severe and immediate retribution against its captives.

== Casualties ==
Estimates of the total number of casualties vary. According to Žrtve vojne in revolucije (2004) by Dr. Boris Mlakar, there were approximately 129 victims, including 13 members of the Black Hand killed during the war. Other sources, such as Nasilje vojnih in povojnih dni (edited by Nevenka Troha), suggest a higher figure of around 1,000 victims.
