= 14th Division (Yugoslav Partisans) =

Yugoslav Partisan division in Lower Carniola in 1943

14th Slovenia Division
- Štirinajsta slovenska udarna divizija Četrnaesta slovenačka udarna divizija / Четрнаеста словеначка ударна дивизија
- Flag of Democratic Federal Yugoslavia (used by the Partisans)
- Active: 13 July 1943–1945
- Country: Yugoslavia
- Branch: Yugoslav Partisan Army
- Type: Infantry
- Size: ~2,400 (9 August 1943)
- Part of: 7th Corps
- Engagements: World War II: World War II in Yugoslavia

Commanders
- Notable commanders: Mirko Bračič

The 14th Slovenia Assault Division (Slovene: Štirinajsta slovenska udarna divizija, Serbo-Croatian: Četrnaesta slovenačka udarna divizija / Четрнаеста словеначка ударна дивизија) was a Yugoslav Partisan division formed in Lower Carniola on 13 July 1943. It was formed from the 1st and the 2nd Slovenia Brigades, and on 9 August the 3rd and the 7th Slovenia Brigades also became part of this division. The Commander of the division was Mirko Bračič and its political commissar was Stane Dobovičnik Krt. In October 1943, it became a part of the 7th Corps. The division mostly operated in Slovenia.
