= Tamara Griesser-Pečar =

Slovenian historian (born 1947)

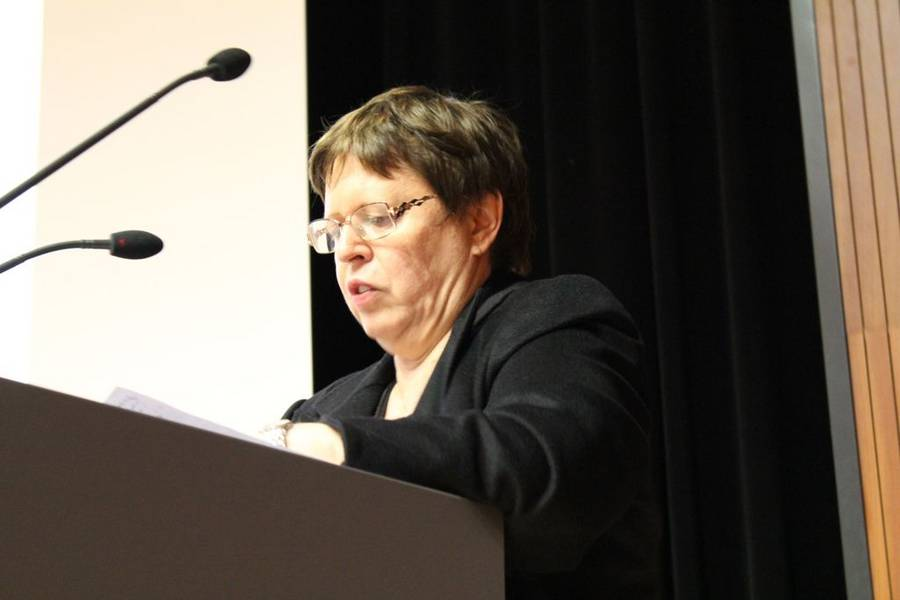
Tamara Griesser Pečar in 2011

Tamara Griesser Pečar (born 18 March 1947) is a Slovenian historian.

== Early life and education ==
She was born in Ljubljana, then part of the Socialist Federal Republic of Yugoslavia. She attended high school in Ljubljana, Koper and Portorož and later in New York City and in Vienna. After graduating from the American International School of Vienna, she studied history at the American University of Paris and later history and English at the University of Vienna, where she obtained her PhD in 1973 with a dissertation on the positions of the Slovenian autonomous government towards Carinthia and Carinthian Slovenes between 1918 and 1920.

== Literary career ==
She has written on the dissolution of Austria-Hungary, on the position of the Roman Catholic Church in Communist Slovenia and on the period of World War II in Slovenia. In 2003, she published a book in German entitled "The Divided Nation. Slovenia 1941–1945: Occupation, Collaboration, Civil War and Revolution" (German: Das Zerrissene Volk: Slowenien 1941-1945, Okkupation, Kollaboration, Bürgkrieg, Revolution). The Slovene translation was published in 2006 by the publishing house Mladinska knjiga, becoming a bestseller.

- Zita: Die Wahrheit űber Europas letzte Kaiserin (Zita: Resnica o zadnji evropski cesarici), Gustav Lübber Verlag, Bergisch Gladbach, 1985. (COBISS)
- Die Mission Sixtus: Österreichs Friedensversuch im Ersten Weltkrieg (Misija Sixtus: Avstrijski mirovni poskus med prvo svetovno vojno). Amalthea Verlag, Dunaj, 1988. (COBISS)
- Rožmanov proces, Družina, Ljubljana, 1996. (COBISS)
- Stanislav Lenič: Življenjepis iz zapora. Mohorjeva založba, Celovec-Ljubljana-Dunaj, 1997. (COBISS)
- Cerkev na zatožni klopi: Sodni procesi, administrativne kazni, posegi »ljudske oblasti« v Sloveniji od 1943 do 1960. Družina, Ljubljana, 2005. (COBISS)
- Med sodbo sodišča in sodbo vesti: dokumenti sodnega procesa proti škofu Gregoriju Rožmanu. Družina, Ljubljana, 2009. [COBISS.SI-ID 247561984] Soavtorji: Marija Čipić Rehar, France M. Dolinar, Blaž Otrin, Julijana Visočnik.
- Zita: L'ultima imperatrice d'Austria-Ungheria (Zita: Resnica o zadnji evropski cesarici), Libreria Editrice, Gorizia, 2009. COBISS 995973
- Die Stellung der slowenischen Landesregierung zum Land Kärnten 1918-1920 (Stališče slovenske deželne vlade do Koroške 1918-1920), in: Studia Carinthiaca, Band XXX, Mohorjeva/Hermagoras, Klagenfurt/Celovec - Ljubljana/Laibach - Wien/Dunaj, 2010. [COBISS=1047429]
- Maribor/Marburg an der Drau : eine kleine Stadtgeschichte. Böhlau Verlag, Wien; Köln; Weimar, 2011. [COBISS.SI-ID 1135749]

== Awards ==
In 2004, she was awarded the Pro Ecclesia et Pontifice order by Pope John Paul II.
