= Karl Novak =

Slovenian chetnik leader

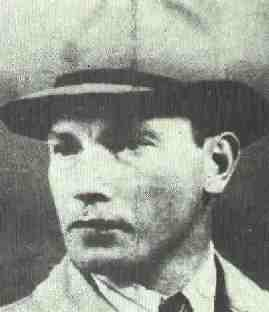
- Karl Novak in the 1930s
- Born: October 19, 1905; Pula, Austrian Littoral, Austria-Hungary (now Croatia)
- Died: 1975 (aged 69–70); Athens, Greece
- Other name: Ludwig
- Military career
- Allegiance: Yugoslavia
- Service: Chetniks
- Service years: 1930s–1945
- Rank: Major (until December 25, 1943); Lieutenant colonel (since December 25, 1943)
- Unit: Blue Guard
- Conflicts: Battle of Grčarice

Karl Novak (October 19, 1905 – 1975) was a Yugoslav Slovene military officer best known as commander of the Slovene Chetniks in the Italian-annexed Province of Ljubljana (part of modern-day Slovenia) during World War II.

== Early life ==
Novak was born in Pula in 1905. After he graduated from high school in Maribor, he attended the military academy.

Before World War II, Novak was a major in the Yugoslav Royal Army.

== World War II ==
After the Axis invasion of Yugoslavia in April, 1941 Novak went to headquarters of Draža Mihailović at Ravna Gora together with Jaka Avšič. Novak was instructed by Mihailović to infiltrate the headquarters of the communist forces in Slovenia, but this attempt failed because the Slovenian communists were warned by the communist headquarters from Užice.

In February 1943, Novak, Draža Mihailović's chief representative in the province, having tried for many months to get the Slovene Alliance to place some of their forces under his command, formed his own militia, known as the Blue Guard (also known as the "Slovene Chetniks"). All major resistance factions in Slovenia had their representatives in Novak's headquarters, including Slovenian Legion, National Legion and Sokol Legion. Novak was the only Chetnik commander who exercised complete political and military control over units under his nominal command. However, this unit never grew larger than 400 troops, and because Novak had no political base in Slovenia, it was never a significant military or political force. After the war, Novak claimed that the Royal Yugoslav Army in Slovenia had armed encounters with Italian troops and gathered intelligence on the Italians for Mihailović, but according to the historian Jozo Tomasevich the first claim is groundless as the Italians allocated an operational zone to Novak's principal unit and indirectly provided it with supplies, and its size and restrictions on its movement precluded the gathering of much useful intelligence.

Near Novo Mesto, in August 1943 Novak established the Ljubljana Chetnik Detachment. Major Novak was in Ljubljana during the Battle of Grčarice and commanded his units through radio connection. After the defeat of his units in this battle, Major Novak went to Rome to avoid German attempts to arrest him in Ljubljana. On December 25, 1943, Mihailović promoted Novak to the rank of lieutenant colonel. In January 1944 Novak and Dobrosav Jevđević, head of Mihailović's intelligence service in Italy, established a Chetnik military unit in the Slovenian Littoral and established its first detachment in the Gorizia Hills. Novak was some kind of envoy for Mihailović with the Allies in Italy and had the intention of using this new Chetnik unit as the nucleus for new Chetnik action in Slovenia, and so he requested that Mihailovic's headquarters obtain financial support from the Yugoslav embassy in Switzerland.

Novak died in Athens in 1975.

== Sources ==
- Minić, Miloš (1993). Oslobodilački ili građanski rat u Jugoslaviji 1941-1945. Agencija "Mir". ISBN 9788682295013.
- Karchmar, Lucien (1973). Draz̆a Mihailović and the Rise of the C̆etnik Movement, 1941-1942. Department of History, Stanford University.
- Крањц, Маријан Ф (2006). Plava garda: zaupno poročilo četniškega vojvode in generalštabnega polkovnika Karla I. Novaka, poveljnika slovenskih četnikov. Pro-Andy. ISBN 978-961-91794-3-7.
- Latas, Branko; Dželebdžić, Milovan (1979). Četnički pokret Draže Mihailovića 1941-1945. Beogradski izdavačko-grafički zavod.
- Kristen, Samo (2006). Meje in misije: dileme slovensko-hrvaške razmejitve v Istri v vojaškem, političnem, diplomatskem in obveščevalnem metežu II. svetovne vojne. Društvo 2000. ISBN 978-961-6533-19-5.
- Marković, Života (1988). Tito i Užička republika. Vesti. ISBN 9788673190136.
- Mlakar, Boris (2003). Slovensko domobranstvo, 1943-1945: ustanovitev, organizacija, idejno ozadje. Slovenska matica. ISBN 978-961-213-114-2.
- Nose, Aleš (2008). Domobranci zdravo - Bog daj: protikomunistične enote na Slovenskem 1942-1945. Modrijan. ISBN 978-961-241-223-4.
- Šubelj, Ljuba Dornik (1999). Oddelek za zaščito naroda za Slovenijo. Arhiv Republike Slovenije. ISBN 978-961-6137-35-5.
- Tomasevich, Jozo (2001). War and Revolution in Yugoslavia, 1941–1945: Occupation and Collaboration. Stanford: Stanford University Press. ISBN 978-0-8047-3615-2.
