= Turjak Castle =

13th-century castle in Lower Carniola, Slovenia

Coordinates: 45°52′36.82″N 14°36′27.24″E

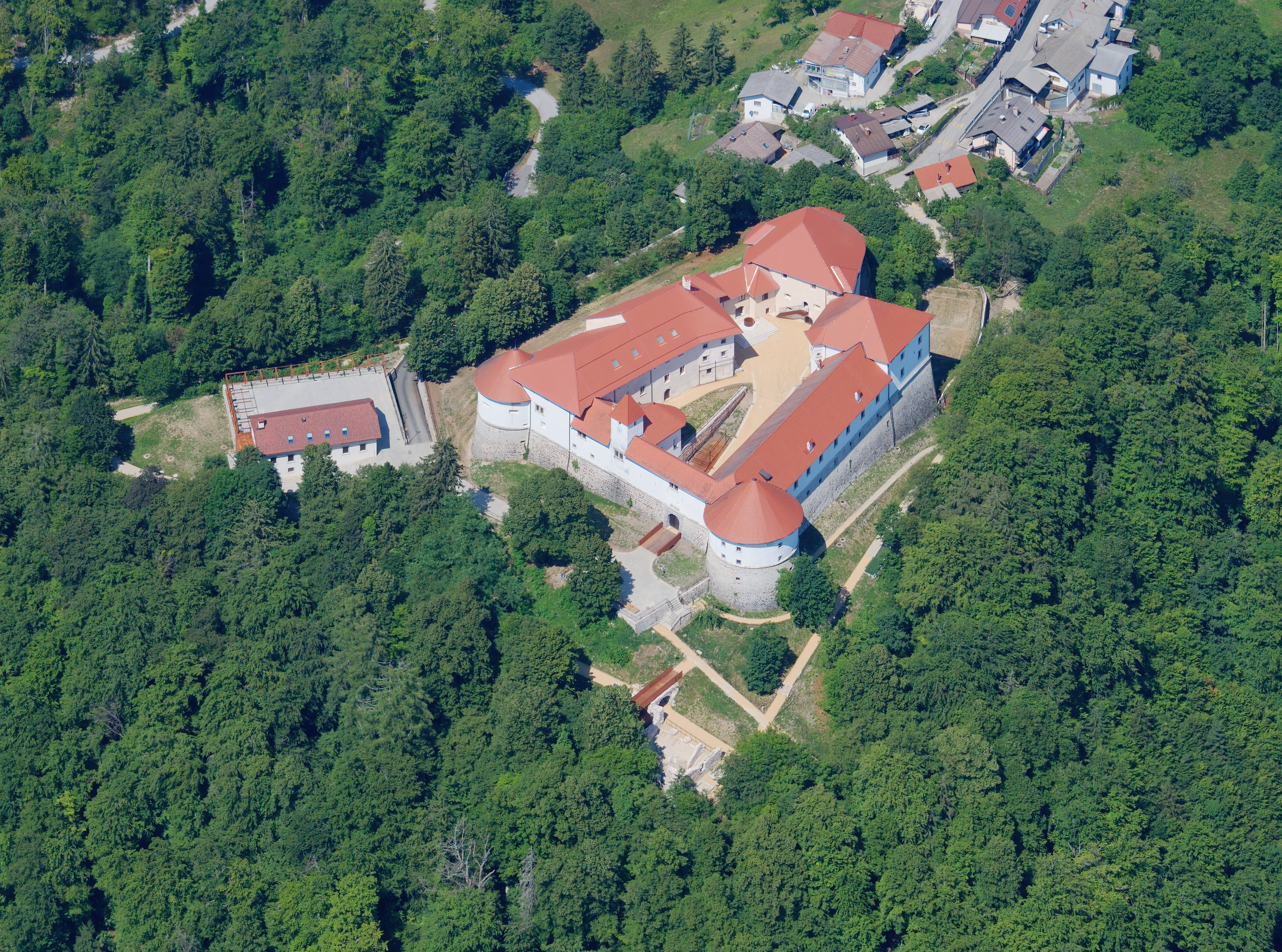
Aerial view of Turjak Castle

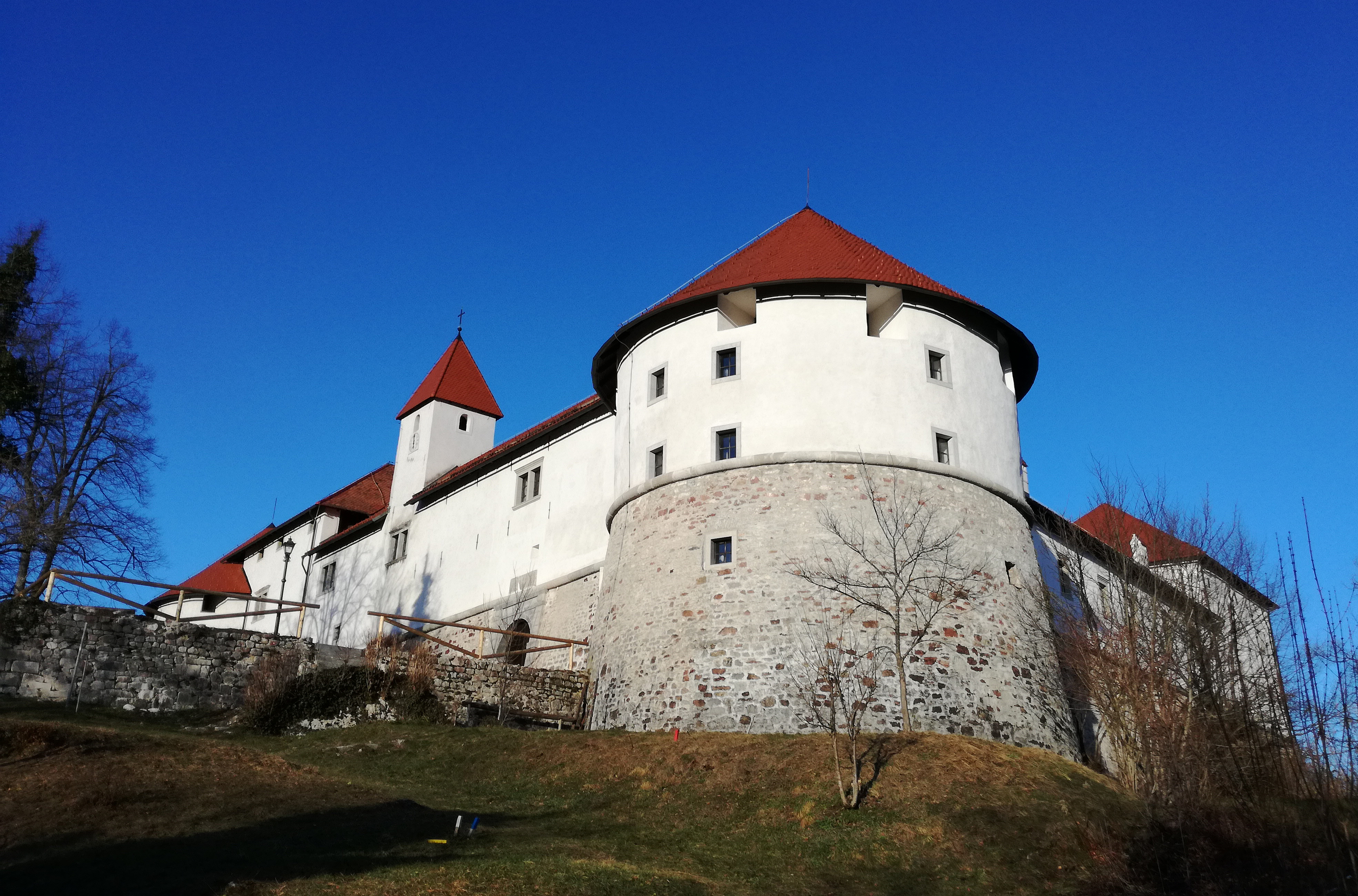
Turjak Castle (Auersperg Castle)

Turjak Castle (pronounced [tuˈɾjaːk]; Slovene: grad Turjak or turjaški grad, German: Burg Ursperg, later Burg Auersperg) is a 13th-century castle located above the settlement of Turjak, part of the municipality of Velike Lašče in the Lower Carniola region of Slovenia. The castle is 20 km southeast of Ljubljana and is considered among the most impressive in the area.

== Etymology ==
The origin of the castle's name is uncertain: local tradition has held that it derives from the extinct wild cattle aurochs (in Slovene, tur). It is more likely a corruption of the name of its founders, the knights Ursberg, later Auersperg. The similarity to Turriaco in Italy, also known as Turjak in Slovene, is widely considered coincidental.

== History ==
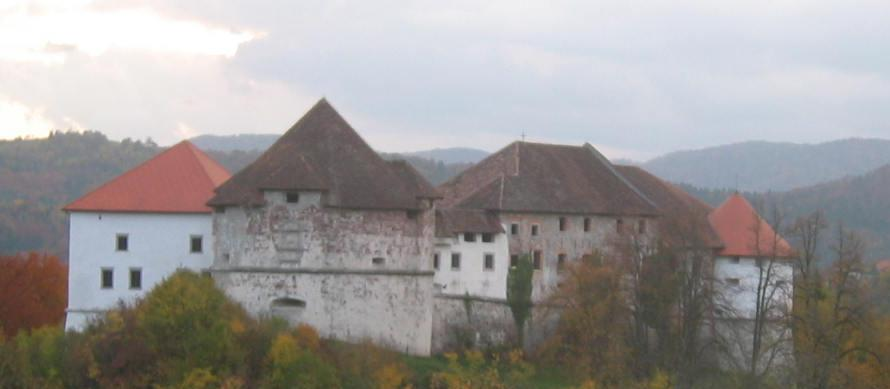
Turjak Castle, panorama

The first Turjak castle was built on the site as early as the late 11th century by the knights (later counts) von Auersperg. It may have been extant by 1062, the date the family (specifically Konrad von Auersperg) is first mentioned. In 1140, it was destroyed and burned during a succession struggle between the two heirs of Pilgram II von Auersperg, his son Pilgram IV and his son-in-law Otto von Ortenburg. The castle was held by Pilgram IV, who was defeated.

In 1190 it was rebuilt by count Adolf II von Auersperg, whose son Otto became entangled in a complicated war with the noble houses of von Gortz, Ortenburg, and the Patriarchate of Aquileia, during which the castle was again flattened. Afterward, the site of the first two castles was abandoned in favor of the current one further upslope.

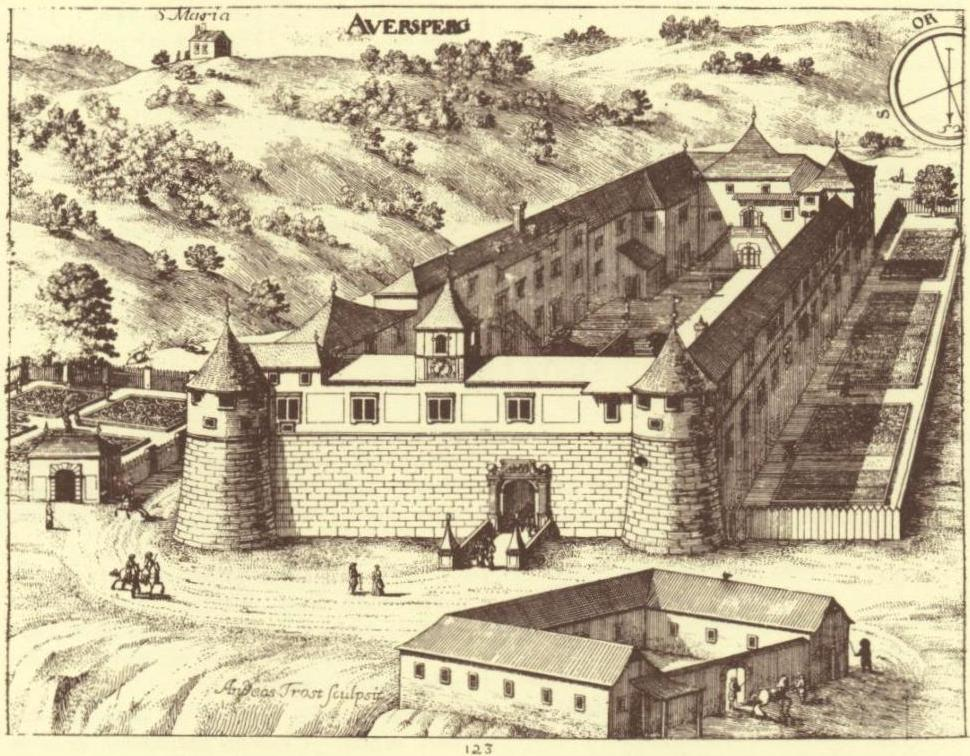
Turjak Castle, 1689 engraving in The Glory of the Duchy of Carniola

The current castle is first mentioned in 1220. In 1270, Peter and Wolfgang von Auersperg sold it to another branch of the family, only to have it bought back by Balthazar von Auersperg, chancellor of the Holy Roman Empire. In the 14th century, Auersperg owners included Gerhard (1317), and the brothers Friederich, Volkard and Herward. The castle was completely destroyed by the great earthquake of 1511, but was rebuilt in time to successfully resist a furious peasants' revolt in 1515 that laid waste to several other castles in the region. It faced a more serious challenge from Turkish raiders, who undertook major assaults against it in 1491 and 1528, but were repelled both times.

The Auerspergs had a reputation as capable military leaders; Ivan of Turjak fell in the battle of Vienna in 1529, Herbard of Turjak (Herbard VIII von Auersperg) died at Budačko in 1575, while Andreas von Auersperg, the "Carniolan Achilles," commanded Carinthian and Carniolan forces at the battle of Sisak and contributed to a decisive victory against the Ottomans on 22 June 1593.

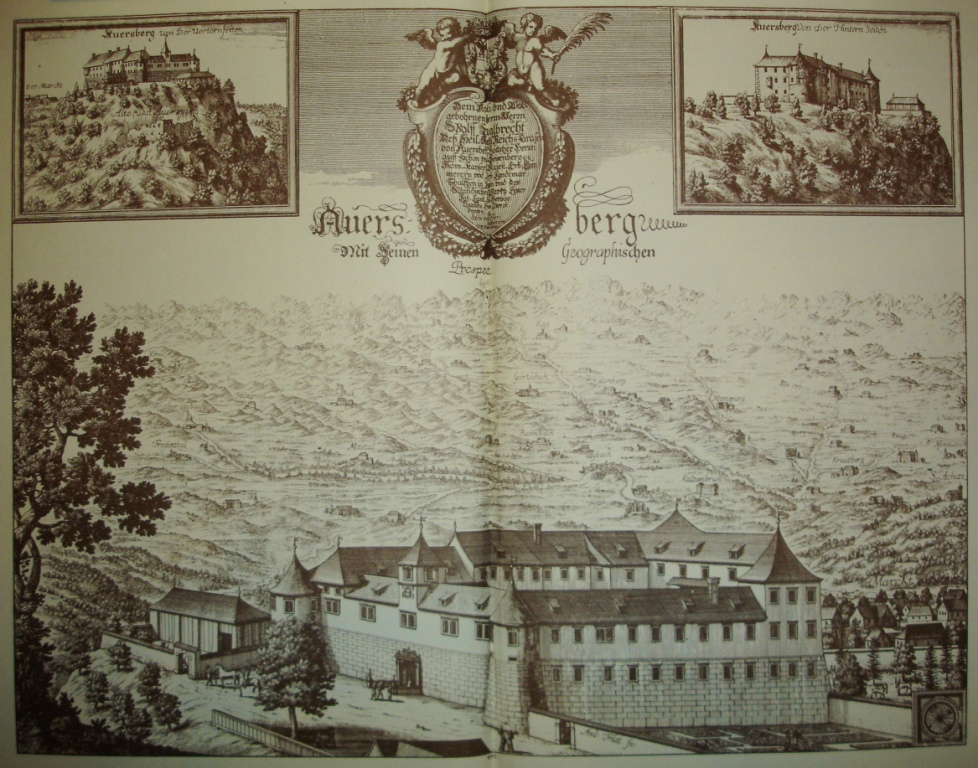
Turjak Castle, 1689 engraving in The Glory of the Duchy of Carniola

During the 16th century, the Auerspergs were strong supporters of the Protestant Reformation in Slovenia. The major Slovene Protestant leaders Primož Trubar and Jurij Dalmatin were offered sanctuary at the castle, and worked on the first translation of the Bible into Slovene during their stay. The Counts also offered financial support to the project of printing some of the first Slovene books.

17th century Turjak lords included Johan Andreas von Auersperg and Wolf Engelbert von Auersperg, the last noted by the historian Valvasor, who attested to the castle's importance by including two etchings of it in his Glory of the Duchy of Carniola of 1689, including a two-page spread.

His son and successor Adam Anton Siegfried established a fideicommiss or entailment in 1739 (the year of his death), including the Turjak lordship, the holding of Nadlischegg in Mokronog and the Turjak (or Auersperg) Palace in Ljubljana. He was succeeded by eldest son Adolf Engelbert Ignaz, who died in 1768. On 20 May 1769, the allodial land ownership passed to his widow Elisabeth (nee Lichtenberg), while the fideicommiss went to his brother-in-law Josef Maria.

After his death on 24 December 1805, the fideicommiss properties went to Johann Paul Alois, and then to the count Josef von Auersperg, who held it until his death on 12 October 1883, followed by his son count Leo von Auersperg. Between 1916 and 1931, the owner of the fideicommiss was Leo's son Herward, followed by his son, also named Herward.

On 19 September 1943, the castle was taken by Partisans (ironically of the Prešeren brigade) after a lengthy battle with its garrison of Slovene Blue Guard detachments of Yugoslav Army in the Homeland. About five hundred of them were taken prisoner and became the target of retribution, in the form of notable war crimes. The castle was severely damaged in the battle, and lay in ruins for several years. Following WWII, the castle was nationalized, and restoration work slowly undertaken.

In 2006, the president of Slovenia, Janez Drnovšek, founded the Movement for Justice and Development, a civil-society group, at a large rally at the castle.

== Architecture ==
The castle is of triangular layout and stands on a terraced hill. Large Renaissance defensive towers (bastilles) at the points of the triangle are connected by residential wings. The western tower contains a suite of dungeons of varying degrees of unpleasantness. The tall central palacium dates from the Romantic period.

The castle has been significantly altered several times throughout its history. As recently as the 1680s, the Valvasor engravings show a rectangular structure with small towers at only two corners and a large bastille at the eastern end. This layout dates to the major rebuilding after the devastating 1512 earthquake, though some pre-16th century elements survive, notably the north wing and portions of the defensive walls.

The original 10th- or 11th-century castle stood lower on the slope; some minor ruins are still visible.

The castle is unusual in having two chapels. A Catholic one on the west side has served as a church since 1789; after a 1990 renovation, mass has been held there every Sunday. A second Romanesque Protestant chapel is named after Dalmatin, and contains the tombs of the Protestant counts, as well as gothic frescoes.

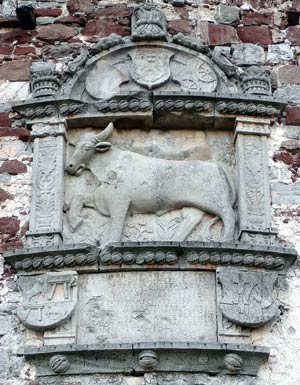
The slab built in the tower, 16th century

On the east side of the castle, a stone slab adorns the "ox tower." The inscription grasped early days of the castle. The coat-of-arms and the bison are engraved next to the text, that was gilded once upon a time. The inscription announced:

ANNO DOMINI 1067 IAR IST
AVRSPERG DVRCH HERN CONRAT
VON AVRSPERG ANGEFANGEN
PAVN NACHMALS DVRCH DEN ERT
PVDEM IM 1511 IAR ZERSCHVT
ABER DVRCH MICH TROIAN VON
AVRSPERG OBRISTN ERB CAMRER
IN CRAIN VNMD DER WIDISCHEN
MARK IN GRVND
ABGESPROCEHN VND VON NEVEN ANGEFANGEN ZV
PAVEN IM 1520 IAR

== Cultural significance ==
Turjak Castle is fairly well known in Slovenia, in part for its colorful and turbulent history, which includes several grotesque vignettes:

- Once displayed in the castle armory were the heads of Herbard von Auersperg and Friedrich von Weichselburg (Slovene: Herbard Turjaški and Friderik Višnjegorski), both killed in battle with Ottoman forces in 1575. Their heads were skinned and tanned, then sent as mementos to the Sultan in Constantinople, from where relatives later ransomed them at considerable cost.
- The chapel of the Turjak graveyard houses a glass jar containing the preserved heart of the young count Hanno von Auersperg (1838–1861), who supposedly committed suicide after being exiled to Naples by his family for refusing to give up a girl who was beneath him socially.

The castle is also known for its importance to the history of the Reformation in Slovene lands; its greatest claim to fame, however, is as the setting of one of Slovene national poet France Prešeren's most popular ballads, "Rosamund of Turjak" (Turjaška Rozamunda). It concerns the wooing of the bratty heiress of Turjak in the late Middle Ages.
