= Blue Guard (Slovene) =

Royal Yugoslav Army in Slovenia Blue Guard
- Chetnik flag; inscription reads: "For king and fatherland; freedom or death"
- Active: 1941–1945
- Allegiance: Yugoslav government-in-exile
- Type: Guerrilla organization
- Size: 300–600
- Part of: Chetniks
- Nickname: Slovene Chetniks
- Motto: Svoboda ali smrt
- Engagements: World War II in Yugoslavia: Battle of Grčarice; Siege of Turjak

Commanders
- 1941: Jaka Avšič
- 1941–44: Karl Novak
- 1944–45: Ivan Prezelj

The Blue Guard (Slovene: Plava garda), also known as the Slovene Chetniks (Slovene: Slovenski četniki, Serbo-Croatian: Slovenački četnici), was a Slovenian anti-communist militia, initially under the leadership of Major Karl Novak and later Ivan Prezelj. Their official name was the Royal Yugoslav Army in Slovenia.

== History ==
The detachments under Novak's command were part of the wider Chetniks that included units from all over Yugoslavia that swore allegiance to Draža Mihailović. The ranks were drawn from Slovene officers in the pre-war Royal Yugoslav Army (JV). At first, the JV units in Slovenia that offered resistance were under the command of Jaka Avšič until his mid-1941 transfer to the Yugoslav Partisans. Based on direct appointment of Draža Mihailović, the commander of Slovene Chetniks was Karel Novak. Slovene Chetnik units included Styrian Chetnik detachments that were, according to some estimates, the only anti-Communist military unit that consistently attacked Axis occupiers throughout the war. The detachment under Melaher's command had 200 men.

In 1942, the bulk of members joined the Legion of Death.

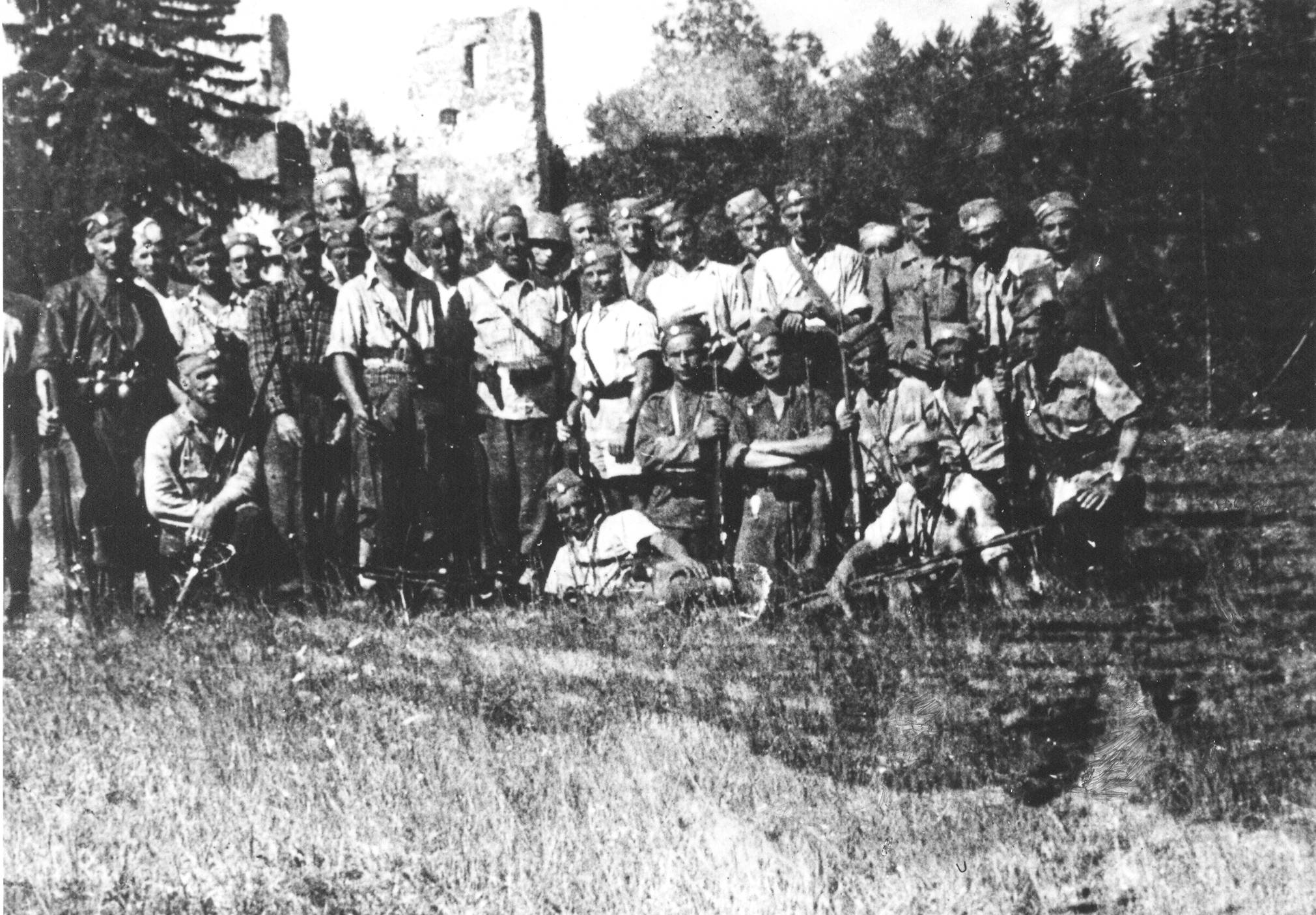
Slovene Chetniks in Lower Carniola, c. 1942–43.

When Karel Novak resigned in 1944, because the defeat in the Battle of Grčarice, Mihailović appointed Ivan Prezelj as commander. His headquarter was with the Inner Carniola Detachment and Soča Detachments, and the Slovene Chetniks also included the Lower Carniola Detachment and the Styria Detachment, commanded by Jože Melaher.

== Sources ==
- Antonio J. Munoz (1998). Slovenian Axis Forces in World War II, 1941-1945. Axis Europa. ISBN 978-1-891227-12-7.
- Tomasevich, Jozo (2001). War and Revolution in Yugoslavia, 1941–1945: Occupation and Collaboration. Stanford: Stanford University Press. ISBN 978-0-8047-3615-2.
