= Legion of Death (military unit) =

The Legion of Death (Slovene: Legija Smrti) was a regimental-size Slovenian anti-Communist militia of the Second World War and fought on the side of Italian occupation forces.

The first units began to be organized in May 1942, from members of the Slovenian Legion, the Sokol and the National Legion, and Slovenian followers of the Chetnik leader, Draža Mihailović. When Mussolini approved the offer of the Slovenian People's Party for military collaboration against the Partisans, in July 1942 the fascist authorities established the Volunteer Anti-Communist Militia (PPKM/MVAC, also known as the Village Guards), which operated under the command of the Italian army. The Legion of Death then joined the PPKM as the largest unit.

The Legion consisted of three battalions (1st, 2nd and 3rd battalions of the PPKM/MVAC), and was formed in 1942 from the fake Štajerski battalion, a unit of Slovenian Chetniks that operated in Dolenjska. Each of the three battalions had around 250 Chetniks. The first battalion, commanded by Serbian captain (captain) Dobrivoje Vasiljević - Iztok, consisted of village guards in the Polhograj Dolomites, the second battalion, commanded by captain Milan Kranjc, was stationed in Brezovica, and the third battalion was based in Suhorje in Gorjanci. The unit was quite successful in combat, but later friction began to arise between the commanding officers (officers of the army of the Kingdom of Yugoslavia) and the fighters, who were mostly locals recruited into the village guards. The situation in the Legion improved in the autumn of 1942, when five curates joined it. In October 1942, the Legion of Death had a total of 1,731 members (1st Battalion – 665, 2nd Battalion – 650, and 3rd Battalion 416 men).

The Legion of Death at that time united various political and military cliques. The Legion of Death consisted of members of the Catholic Action, Glavačevci, Stražarji and Chetniks, with the most militant being the Glavačevci faction, which even killed two Chetnik officers in one dispute.

== Defeat of the 3rd Battalion and the Collapse of the Legion ==
The 3rd Battalion of the Legion, headquartered in Suhorje near Metlika, soon became the target of attacks by the National Liberation Army and partisan detachments of Slovenia. The partisan leadership intended to destroy the unit in a quick action. On the night of 27 November 1942, the 5th Slovenian National Liberation Strike Brigade "Ivan Cankar" and the 13th Croatian Brigade and the Vzhodnodolje Detachment attacked Suhor. The attack was successful, with partisan units killing 16 and capturing 91 legionnaires. In addition to the legionnaires, several residents of Suhor were also arrested, and the prisoners were taken to Popoviče pod Gorjanci. There, after interrogation, eight people were sentenced to death and liquidated, including the commander of the first battalion, Dobrivoje Vasiljević - Iztok.

The Legion of Death thus lost its striking power and until the capitulation of Italy, it only carried out purely defensive tasks. In the autumn of 1943, the remainder of the Legion, led by Vuk Rupnik, son of Leon Rupnik, went to Brežice, on German territory. Most of its members then joined the Slovenian Home Guard, and in Partisan territory, many surviving members were also included in their units by the Partisans.
