= Rupnik =

Rupnik is a surname. Notable people with the surname include:

- Franjo Rupnik (1921–2000), Croatian footballer
- Jure Rupnik (born 1993), Slovenian bicycle racer
- Leon Rupnik (1880–1946), Slovenian general and war criminal
- Lidija Rupnik (1915–2003), Slovenian gymnast
- Luka Rupnik (born 1993), Slovenian basketball player
- Marko Ivan Rupnik (born 1954), Slovenian priest, author, mosaicist, and alleged sexual abuser
- Vasja Rupnik (born 1977), Slovenian biathlete
- Vuk Rupnik (1912–1975), Slovene military officer WWII
