= Adlešič =

Adlešič is a surname. Notable people with the surname include:

- Đurđa Adlešič, Croatian politician
- Juro Adlešič, Slovenian lawyer and politician
- Miroslav Adlešič, Slovene physicist, specialist in acoustics, author of numerous books and textbooks on physics
- Trish Adlesic, American documentary film director and producer
