= Peterlin =

Peterlin is a surname. Notable people with the surname include:

- Anton Peterlin (physicist) (1908–1993), Slovene physicist
- Anton Peterlin (soccer) (born 1987), American soccer player
- Ernest Peterlin (1903–1946), Slovene military officer
- Margaret Peterlin (born 1970), American lawyer and United States Navy veteran
