= Lyenko Urbanchich =

Slovenian-born Australian political activist

Lyenko Urbanchich (alternative surname spellings: Urbančič and Urbancic; December 19, 1922 – February 22, 2006) was a Slovenian-born Australian political activist. During World War II he was a propagandist for the Slovene Home Guard, a Nazi collaborating anti-Partisan military organisation. After fleeing Slovenia for Australia, Urbanchich would re-emerge as a factional figure within the New South Wales Liberal Party, heading a faction that was termed as "the Uglies". He served as the inaugural president of the Liberal Ethnic Council.

== Early life ==
Urbanchich was born Miljenko Urbančič in Šabac, Serbia, to Franjo Urbančič and Milena (née Kalin) Urbančič. His father, originally from Logatec, was working in Serbia as a financial official. The family returned to Slovenia in 1934.

== Wartime activities ==
In the Jutro (Morning) newspaper in June 1944, Urbanchich wrote: "All those Anglophiles – that word is actually wrong, as they are not Anglophiles, but confused people – must bear in mind that our anti-Communist battle would be all in vain if we were to make such a fatal mistake and take today's Anglo-American invasion troops for anything other than what they are, a Jewish-communist tool".

Similarly, in a 1944 broadcast on Radio Ljubljana, Urbanchich stated: "...it is not important that I speak to you as the youngest Slovene journalist ... [what is important] is that) the truth which is older than I, which is centuries old (be proclaimed). That is, the truth about all the vile intentions of the chosen people, the 15 million Israeli race roaming the world".

Later in the broadcast, he concluded with a rallying cry to his listeners to: "... follow our leader, the experienced and homeland-loving General Rupnik, about whom we can say that God himself has sent him to us.... It is our duty to repeat over and over again, to exhaustion, that there is only one way, the way of General Rupnik".

When the communist Yugoslav Partisans won the war in 1945 he fled from Slovenia. He was released from British custody in May 1948, and accepted for migration under Australia's Displaced Persons scheme just 18 months later in 1950.

== Political career ==
A painter and sculptor, he was president of the Liberal Party's Five Dock branch in 1974. During the 1970s and 1980s, he headed an unofficial Liberal faction in Sydney which became known by its enemies as "the Uglies". Over these two decades he was the mentor of David Clarke, who later became a Member of the NSW Legislative Council. Urbanchich was elected as the first president of the Liberal Ethnic Council in 1977, which automatically granted him a seat on the New South Wales Liberal state executive council.

In 1979, allegations were made in an ABC documentary and in the New South Wales and Federal parliaments that Urbanchich had been a Nazi collaborator and anti-Semitic propagandist for the Slovenian government during World War II. He was briefly suspended from the party, but avoided expulsion when the State Executive found by a majority that the claims against him were false. He was replaced, however, as President of the Ethnic Council by Frank Calabro. In 1986 Urbanchich admitted that "I did follow Rupnik and I thought it was correct thing to do at that particular time", but maintained "I never said 'Heil Hitler', I never put a Nazi uniform on, I never greeted in the Nazi way."

Urbanchich died at Sacred Heart Hospice in Sydney on February 22, 2006 and was buried in Merrylands, New South Wales. To his death, Urbanchich remained a member of the Liberal Party, attending a meeting of the state council in 2005.

Inspired by the legacy of Urbanchich, his faction regrouped in 2015.

== See also ==
- Collaboration during World War II
- Leon Rupnik
- Gregorij Rožman
- Slovenian Home Guard
- Partisans (Yugoslavia)
- Yugoslavia during the Second World War
- Invasion of Yugoslavia
