= Franc Frakelj =

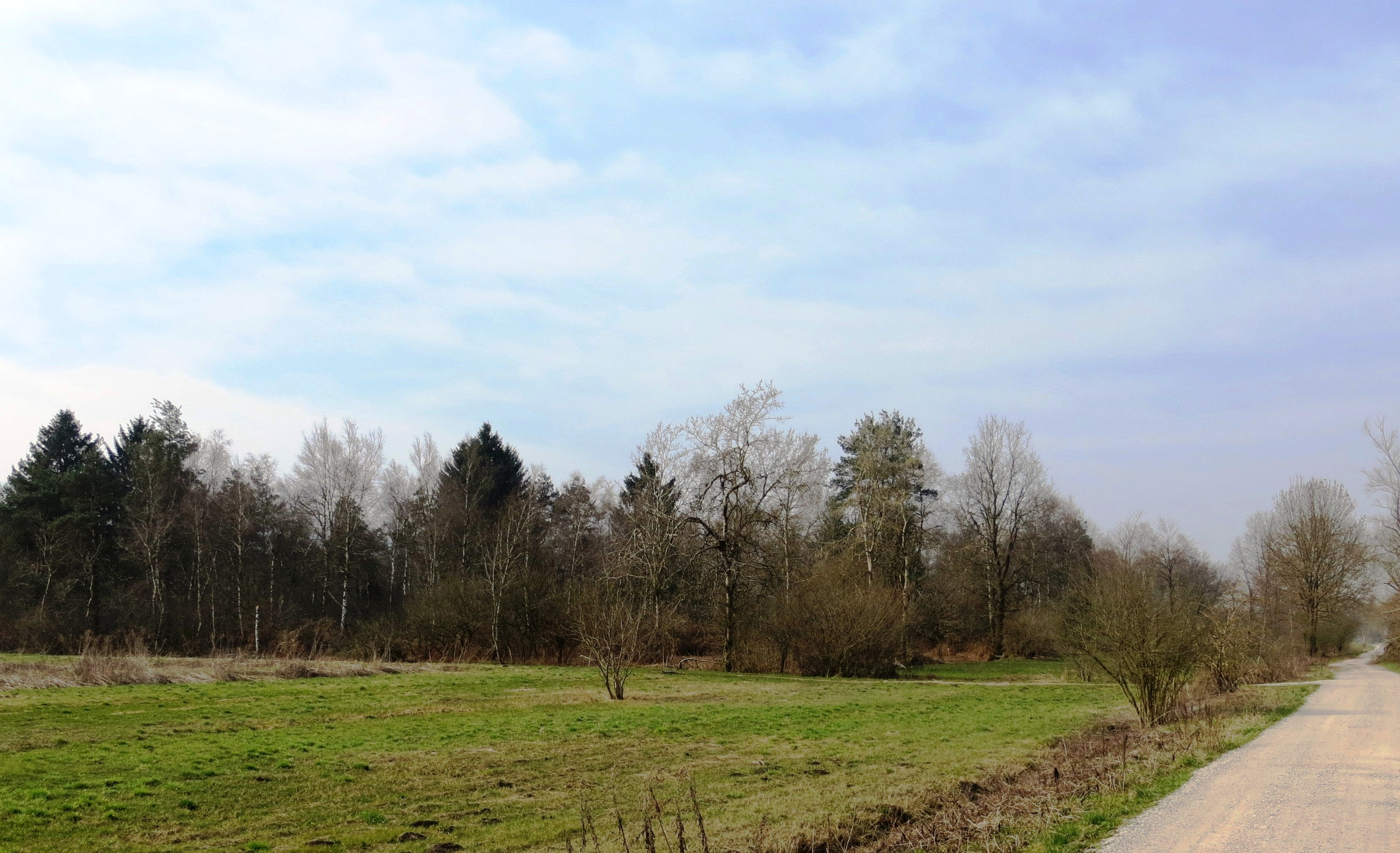
Kosler's Thicket in the Ljubljana Marsh

Franc Frakelj (a.k.a. Peter Skalar) (19 January 1917–?) was a member of the collaborationist Slovene Home Guard (after the Italian fascist capitulation in 1943) and a member of a secret murderous militia called Črna roka (Black Hand) who is accused of killing over 60 people during the Second World War. He and his group used wooden sticks to massacre local people in the winter of 1943–44 in Kosler's Thicket in the marshes south of Ljubljana.

Frakelj was born in Dražgoše (a part of Železniki), a village in northwestern Slovenia, which was destroyed in 1942 by the German Army. Before the Battle of Turjak Castle (September 19, 1943) Frakelj was the commander of a stronghold of village guards in Tomišelj south of Ljubljana.

He died in Canada living under the name Peter Markis.

== See also ==
- Collaboration during World War II
- Slovenian Home Guard
- Slovene Partisans
- Yugoslav Partisans
- Yugoslavia during the Second World War
