= Leon Rupnik =

Slovenian general (1880–1946)

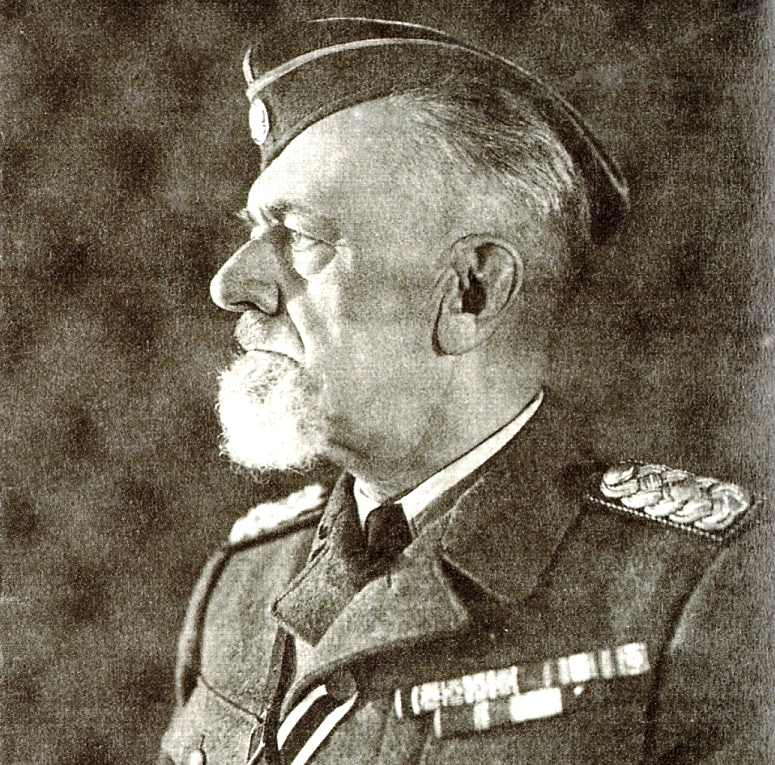
- Leon Rupnik during World War II
- Born: August 10, 1880; Lokve, Gorizia and Gradisca, Austria-Hungary
- Died: September 4, 1946 (aged 66); Ljubljana, PR Slovenia, Yugoslavia
- Cause of death: Execution by firing squad
- Relatives: Vuk Rupnik

President of the Ljubljana provisional administration
- In office June 7, 1942 – May 1945
- Military career
- Allegiance: Austria-Hungary (1895–1918); Kingdom of Yugoslavia (1919–1941); Nazi Germany (1943–1945); Province of Ljubljana
- Service years: 1895–1941, 1942–1945
- Rank: Divisional General
- Nickname: Lev
- Unit: Slovene Home Guard
- Conflicts: First World War; Second World War

Leon Rupnik, also known as Lav Rupnik or Lev Rupnik (August 10, 1880 – September 4, 1946) was a Slovene general in the Kingdom of Yugoslavia who collaborated with the Fascist Italian and Nazi German occupation forces during World War II. Rupnik served as the President of the Provincial Government of the Nazi-occupied Province of Ljubljana from November 1943 to early May 1945. Between September 1944 and early May 1945, he also served as chief inspector of the Slovene Home Guard (Slovene: Domobranci), a collaborationist militia, although he did not have any military command until the last month of the war.

== Early career ==
Rupnik was born in Lokve near Gorizia, a village in what was then the Austrian county of Gorizia and Gradisca (now part of Nova Gorica, southwestern Slovenia). A career soldier, from 1895 to 1899 he studied at the infantry military academy in Trieste and graduated as a junior second lieutenant. His schooling continued in Vienna from 1905 to 1907. After World War I, he joined the Royal Yugoslav Army in May 1919 with the rank of active staff major. He thereafter climbed the ranks, becoming a lieutenant-colonel (1923), colonel (1927), brigadier general (1933) and major general (1937). When the Wehrmacht invaded the Kingdom of Yugoslavia on April 6, 1941, Rupnik was Chief of Staff of 1st Army Group.

== The Rupnik Line ==
After the Third Reich and the Kingdom of Italy had formed the Axis alliance, the Kingdom of Yugoslavia decided to construct a line of fortresses along the borders to defend itself against possible attacks from the north and the west. The constructions was mostly carried out on the border with Italy in the Drava Banovina. The line was initially staffed by 15,000, but the number increased to 40,000 by 1941. As Rupnik was in charge of their completion, the 'Rupnik Line' became the common name for these fortifications.

The defences were built on the French Maginot Line and Czechoslovak models, adapted to local conditions. After the invasion of Yugoslavia on April 6, 1941, few of them were ready and the German Wehrmacht campaign quickly rendered the line obsolete.

== Collaboration ==
After the quick defeat of the Royal Yugoslav Army, Rupnik was released from German military prison and moved to Italian-annexed southern Slovenia (known as the Province of Ljubljana) on April 17, 1941. On June 7, 1942, he accepted the position of president of the Provincial Council of Ljubljana, thus replacing Juro Adlešič as mayor under Italian annexation. After the Italian armistice in September 1943, Ljubljana was occupied by the Germans. Friedrich Rainer, Nazi Gauleiter of Carinthia, nominated Rupnik as president of the new provincial government, after a consultation with Roman Catholic Bishop Gregorij Rožman, who agreed with Rainer's intention to put Rupnik in charge of the provisional government. Bishop Rožman praised Rupnik highly, stating he was "the most capable man for this administrative position".

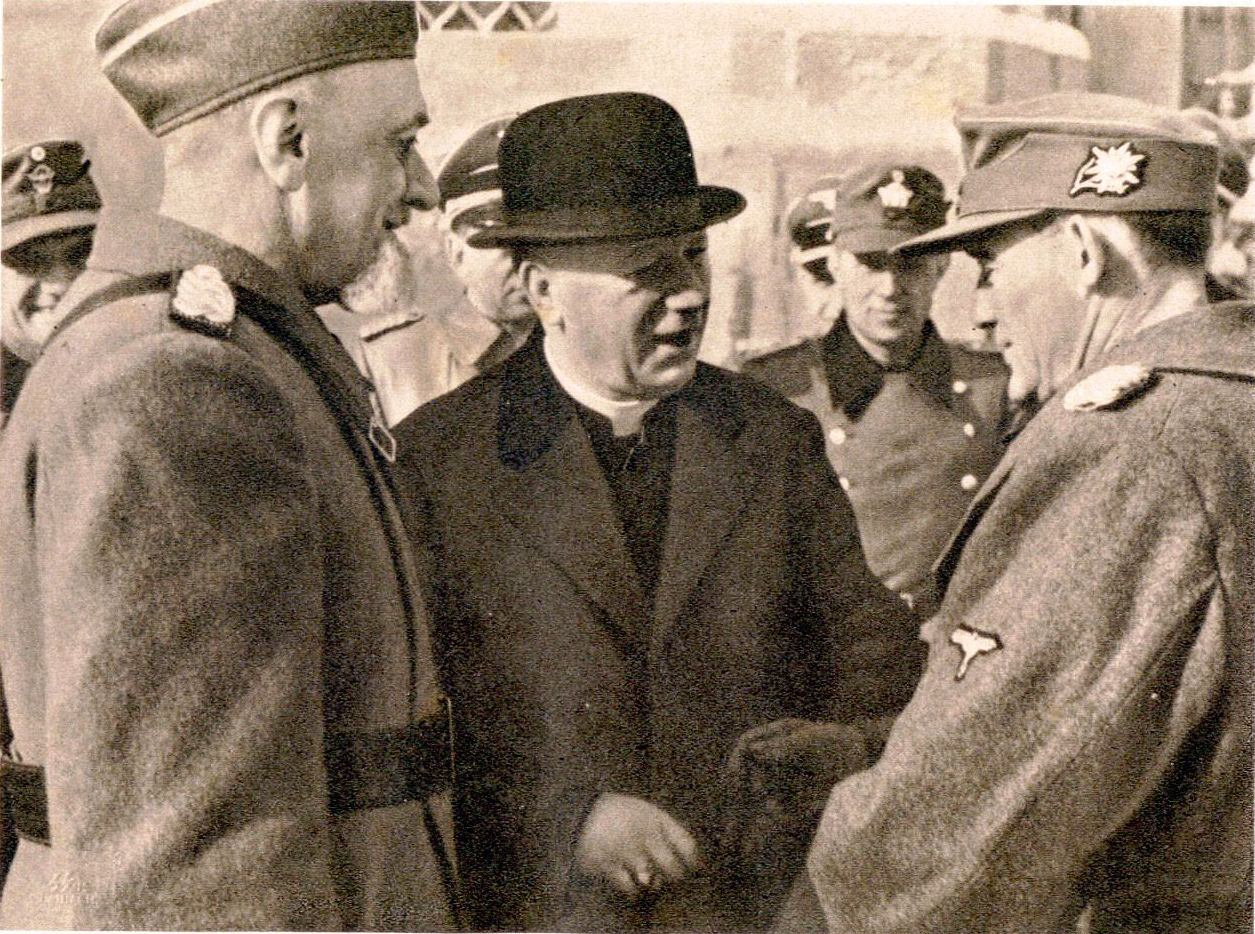
Leon Rupnik, Bishop Gregorij Rožman, and SS General Erwin Rösener

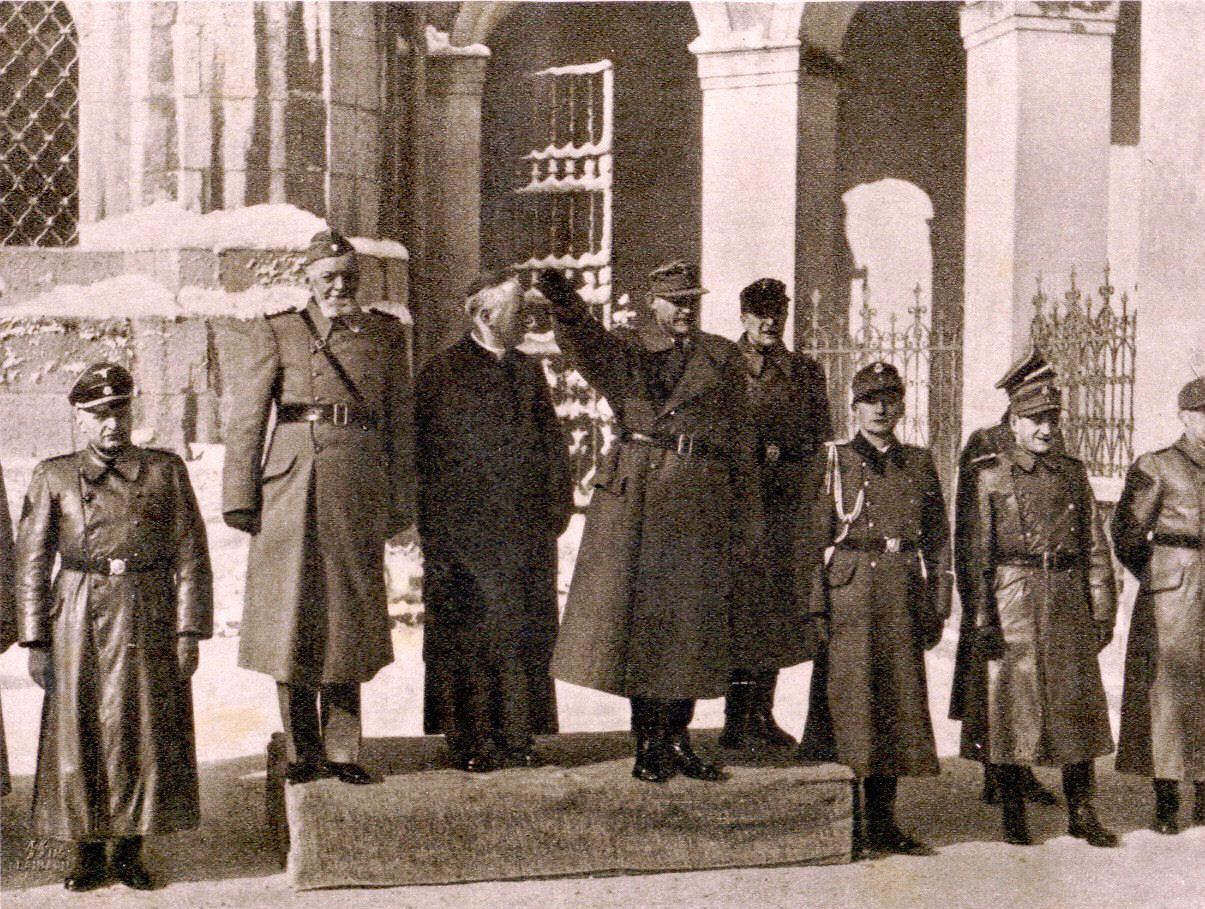
Leon Rupnik, Bishop Gregorij Rožman and SS General Erwin Rösener review Home Guard troops in front of the Ursuline Church, Ljubljana, after the Home Guard oath of allegiance on January 30, 1945.

Friedrich Rainer also proposed the creation of the Home Guard, which functioned under the command of SS Lieutenant-General, Erwin Rösener, who in turn reported directly to SS Chief, Heinrich Himmler. Together with Anton Kokalj, Ernest Peterlin and Janko Kregar, Rupnik was also one of the founders of the Slovene Home Guard, an auxiliary military unit of the SS, formed as a voluntary militia to fight the partisan resistance movement. The militia was organized mostly by members of Slovene anti-Communist politicians gathered around the underground organization Slovenian Covenant (Slovene: Slovenska zaveza) in agreement with the German occupation forces. Soon after the formation of the militia on September 23, 1943, Rupnik nominated himself its commander-in-chief.

In his first order to the Home Guard on September 30, Rupnik proclaimed, "whoever is not directly tied to cooperation with the German Army or the police is an armed bandit, and must be attacked and destroyed without delay", urging his men to handover captured partisans to the closest German army or police garrison. He was dismissed by Rainer on November 4, 1943. In September 1944, he was nominated chief inspector of the Slovene Home Guard, a function with virtually no competence.

As president of the provincial administration, Rupnik organized a large-scale bureaucracy which tried to cover all spheres of civilian life, from local administration, to social security and cultural policies. For this purpose, he relied on two groups of aides: on one side, mostly apolitical civil servants and cultural functionaries active already in the Kingdom of Yugoslavia (such as Stanko Majcen and Narte Velikonja); on the other side, he involved several highly ideological and fervently pro-Nazi young individuals, such as Ljenko Urbančič and son-in-law Stanko Kociper. Rupnik succeeded in keeping almost all Slovene cultural and educational institutions functioning under Nazi occupation. In, 1944, he managed to rename the "Academy of Sciences and Arts in Ljubljana" to Slovenian Academy of Sciences and Arts.

Throughout his presidency, Rupnik maintained complete loyalty to the German Nazi occupation authorities. In 1944, while Rupnik served as president of the Ljubljana provincial administration, the Slovene Home Guard Police arrested the remaining Jews, who until then had managed to hide in the city, and turned them over to the Nazi authorities, who sent them to Auschwitz and other concentration camps. He organized several "anti-Communist rallies", in which he delivered violent speeches against the Liberation Front of the Slovenian People, the Western Allies and the "World Jewish Conspiracy". He maintained friendly contacts with the SS general Erwin Rösener, who was later convicted of war crimes.

As Chief Inspector of the Slovenian Home Guard, Rupnik led the Home Guards in two oaths of allegiance - the first on Hitler's birthday on April 20, 1944, then on the 12th anniversary of the Nazis coming to power, on January 30, 1945. In their oaths, the Home Guards swore to fight together with the SS and German police under the leadership of the Führer against the Communist guerillas and their allies. Rupnik disagreed with all attempts by members of the Slovenian Covenant and some military leaders of the Slovene Home Guard to rise against the Nazis, nor did he intervene when several of his former collaborators were arrested by the Nazis and sent to Dachau concentration camp.

=== Antisemitism ===
Known for his antisemitic and openly pro-Nazi views prior to the war, Rupnik was a notorious antisemite, who wrote antisemitic tracts and made antisemitic speeches. Some notable examples include:

In a lecture he gave in Ljubljana in 1944, entitled "Bolshevism: a tool of international Judaism" and subtitled "Jewish endeavours towards global supremacy", Rupnik stated:

The Jews' straight dogmatic hatred of all who are not Jewish is finally challenged everywhere by a revolt by the home nation that sooner or later removes all parasites from their country or limits by law their economic, religious and political activity. (A transcript of the entire lecture is available.)

In a lecture at Polhov Gradec, on June 5, 1944, Rupnik stated:

With solid trust in the righteousness of the leader of Europe, of the German nation, we must calmly and with all fanaticism lead the battle against Jewish global supremacy serving Stalin's and Tito's bandits and their assistants, Anglo-American gangsters.

At the ceremony where the Home Guard swore oaths of allegiance, on January 30, 1945, Rupnik announced:

If the German soldier and you, my bold Home Guard soldiers, allowed these Jewish mercenaries to flourish, they would yet kill all decent thinkers, believers in the nation and homeland of true Slovenian birth together with their children – or we will make cannon fodder or slaves of them, steal their property, homes, villages, devastate the national body and suppress the Jew. These are the nations of Europe, our broader homeland, in whose centre the largest, German nation has taken upon itself the struggle against the Jewish corruption of the world.

== Arrest, trial, and execution ==
On May 5, 1945, Leon Rupnik fled to Austria with a small group of 20 collaborators. He was arrested by the British on July 23 and returned to Yugoslavia in January 1946. He was put on trial alongside Rösener and others, and was sentenced to death for treason on August 30, 1946. He was executed by firing squad on September 4, 1946 at Ljubljana's Žale cemetery, and was buried the same day in an unmarked grave. In January 2020, the Supreme Court of Slovenia annulled the court judgement of 1946 for not meeting the necessary legal standards in force at the time of trial.

In response, the Simon Wiesenthal Center issued a condemnation of the annulment, stating that Rupnik "had played a major role in the arrest and deportation of Jews from Ljubljana in 1943 and 1944". They further noted that "this shameful decision constitutes a shocking distortion of the history of the Holocaust and a horrific insult to Rupnik's many victims and their families". As many had understood the court's decision to constitute political rehabilitation, statements were issued that this was not the case.

The Slovenian Constitutional Court overturned the 2020 rehabilitation of Leon Rupnik by the Supreme Court of Slovenia, thus reinstating his post-war conviction.

== Other ==
Rupnik's son, Vuk, was an active officer of the Slovene Home Guard and commander of one of the most belligerent units in the militia.

Preceded by Juro Adlešič	Mayor of Ljubljana; 1942–1945	Succeeded by Pavel Lunaček
