= David Clarke (Australian politician) =

Australian politician

The Hon. David Clarke

Member of Legislative Council of New South Wales
- In office 22 March 2003 – 23 March 2019

Personal details
- Born: David John Clarke; 2 April 1947 (age 79)
- Party: Liberal Party
- Education: University of Sydney
- Occupation: Solicitor

David John Clarke (born 2 April 1947), an Australian politician, was a member of the New South Wales Legislative Council from 2003 to 2019, representing the Liberal Party. and is considered to have conservative Roman Catholic views.

Prior to entering Parliament, Clarke studied a Bachelor of Laws at the University of Sydney and worked as a solicitor from 1971 to 2003.

== Personal life ==
Clarke is married with four children. While not a member, David Clarke is a co-operator of the Opus Dei prelature of the Roman Catholic Church, and is considered to have conservative Christian views. His wife is a member of Opus Dei.

== Political history ==
Clarke has been called a leading member of the right wing of the Liberal Party in the media. Despite this, Clarke has stated that "I don't think there is a formal factional system operating in the Liberal Party" and that "the Liberal Party traditionally has not been a party based on factions and I don't believe it's based on factions now."

In the late 1970s, Clarke was involved on the Liberal Party's Ethnic Council, which attempted to foster the development of persons of different ethnicities in the Liberal Party, as well as oppose communism in Eastern Europe. While serving on the Ethnic Council, he was asked by many members of the Liberal Party to defend Lyenko Urbanchich against allegations of former Nazi connections. This was successfully accomplished as the State Council of the Liberal Party did not approve his expulsion from the Liberal Party. Former NSW Opposition Leader from 1981 to 1983, John Dowd described Clarke as being "perceived as a lieutenant who carried out the views of Urbanchich and co in their branch stacking and endeavouring to take control of a large measure of the [Liberal] party."

In March 2003, David Clarke became a Member of the NSW Legislative Council and served for the next sixteen years.

He held the following positions while in Parliament

Parliamentary Secretary for Justice: May 2011– Mar 2019.
Deputy Chair Standing Committee on Law and Justice: September 2005 – May 2011
Chair, Standing Committee on Law and Justice: May 2011 – Mar 2015
Deputy Chair, Select Committee on the Leasing of Electricity Infrastructure: May 2015 – Jun 2015
Shadow Parliamentary Secretary for Industrial Relations: 2007 – 2008
Shadow Parliamentary Secretary for Justice: 2008—2011

In February 2010, Clarke won preselection against David Elliott, the chief executive of the Civil Contractors Federation to ensure he can continue to serve on the New South Wales Legislative Council. He announced his retirement in September 2018 and did not contest the 2019 state election.

=== Political viewpoints ===
Clarke has spoken frequently on his political viewpoints stating that they naturally reflect the Liberal Party. He told The Sydney Morning Herald that "I work on the premise that most people have conservative values in the Liberal Party and that my values are in alignment with theirs."

In his first speech in 2003, Clarke promised to "uphold and advocate the conservative, mainstream and Christian-based truths and values that I believe our nation is based upon … with missionary zeal", advocated state sovereignty, the decentralisation of government power, and stated that "I respect the right of individuals to live their lives as they choose, unmolested and without harassment and persecution, provided they do not bring harm to others or to institutions and concepts that protect others."

Clarke's views have been labelled by political opponents as "ultra-conservative" and those held by some in the Christian Right of the Liberal Party (such as his opposition to the "culture of abortion" and opposition to euthanasia). While he describes Australia as "a Christian nation" and argues that there is nothing wrong with religious values influencing legislation on the age of consent, abortion and euthanasia, he denies that his views override his respect for the separation of church and state, individual rights and free enterprise, and notes his support for superannuation rights for same-sex couples, and that same sex couples are entitled to their choice to live together.

Clarke rejects labels given to him by opponents stating "the issues that I've come forward on and I've been publicised about having views on, my stand has been, has the support of the majority of people or if not the majority of people, a very, very significant minority of people. And what I'm saying is whether it's the majority or a significant minority, that certainly doesn't make it an extremist stand.".

=== Criticism ===
Some Liberal colleagues, such as former member of the Legislative Council, Patricia Forsythe, in blaming David Clarke for her failure to win preselection, have expressed trepidation towards what they have called Clarke's "extreme" views. She said in 2005 that she was "very fearful of the power of David Clarke...because he has around him a significant group of people who are absolutely fixated on their agenda, and a very narrow agenda." Similarly, former Member for Hawkesbury, Steven Pringle also attributes his disendorsement to Clarke.

In early 2007, Clarke successfully sued Melbourne University Press for defamation at the District Court of New South Wales after the publication of a book, The Education of a Young Liberal, by former member of the Liberal Party's small 'l' liberal faction (known as "The Group"). The defendant publisher conceded that imputations of political extremism were defamatory, and the court held that the book further defamed Clarke by slurs on his character. Sharri Markson writes that "[I]t's when talking about topics other than politics that he [i.e. Clarke] show the softer side … seems unafraid to be emotional about his family … I'm left wondering whether its possible that one of the most feared men in the NSW Liberal Party is just a big softie." Clarke claims that his Catholic views on social policy issues are broadly consistent with the rest of the community.

NSW Labor MP Kristina Keneally expressed a view in New South Wales Parliament with parliamentary privilege protecting her from lawsuits that Clarke "effect[ed] a right-wing takeover of Liberal Party branches. David Clarke is the godfather of the Extremist Right of the Liberal Party."

=== Connection to Young Liberals ===
Journalist Mark Aarons and others have claimed that Clarke has a significant influence on the Young Liberals. Alex Hawke, a former national president of the Young Liberals and now a federal MP, was his parliamentary staffer. There has been much media coverage of the connection between Clarke and Hawke because of the preselection of Hawke to the Federal seat of Mitchell in June 2007. By October 2009 onwards, it has been reported that Hawke and Clarke had fallen out and become rivals leading to a factional war.

Kyle Kutasi, former Young Liberal and former President of the Sydney University Liberal Club is Clarke's son-in-law.
