= Slovene Home Guard =

Slovene anti-partisan and collaborationist militia

- Slovensko domobranstvo Slowenische Landeswehr
- The symbol of the Slovene Home Guard
- Active: 1943–1945
- Size: about 18,000 at its height (autumn 1944)
- Mottos: Za Boga, narod in domovino "For God, Nation and Homeland"

Commanders
- Notable commanders: Vuk Rupnik; Ernest Peterlin; Franc Krener; Leon Rupnik

Insignia
- Flag

The Slovene Home Guard (Slovene: Slovensko domobranstvo, SD; German: Slowenische Landeswehr) was a Slovene anti-Partisan militia that was founded and supported by the Germans and fought alongside them against the Partisans. It operated during part of the 1943–1944 German occupation of the formerly Italian-annexed Slovene Province of Ljubljana. The Guard consisted of former Village Sentries (Slovene: Vaške straže; Italian: Guardia Civica), part of Italian-sponsored Anti-Communist Volunteer Militia, re-organized under Nazi command after the Italian Armistice of September 1943. At the end of 1944, the National Committee for Slovenia re-organized all the anti-communist armies into one called the Slovenian National Army/Slovenska Narodna Vojska. This new Slovenian National Army re-took their oaths to King Peter in their support of the kingdom of Yugoslavia.

The Guard had close links with Slovenian right-wing anti-Communist political parties and organizations, which provided most of the membership, receiving assistance from the Germans rather than providing assistance to them. In the Slovenian Littoral, a similar but much smaller unit, called the Slovenian National Defense Corps (Slovene: Slovensko narodno varnostni zbor, German: Slowenisches Nationales Schutzkorps), more commonly known as the Littoral Home Guard (Slovene: Primorsko domobranstvo) was ideologically and organizationally linked to the SD. An even smaller Upper Carniolan Self-Defense (Slovene: Gorenjska samozaščita, German: Oberkrainer Landschutz), also known as the Upper Carniolan Home Guard (Slovene: Gorenjsko domobranstvo) operated in Upper Carniola between 1944 and 1945. All three "home guard" units comprised almost exclusively ethnic Slovenes. The officers and the language of command were Slovene.

Some of the resistance groups outside of the communist-led Liberation Front of the Slovene Nation (OF) were collectively known by the OF as White Guards (Slovene: Bela garda), a pejorative term. Some of the British liaison-officers with the Slovene Partisans saw the White Guards as another name for the Home Guards, and declared them enemies of the Allies. All the while, the Slovene Home Guard had embedded intelligence officers into its ranks who secretly spied on the German military movements and reported this intelligence to the British, both in London and to MI6 in Switzerland.

== Background ==
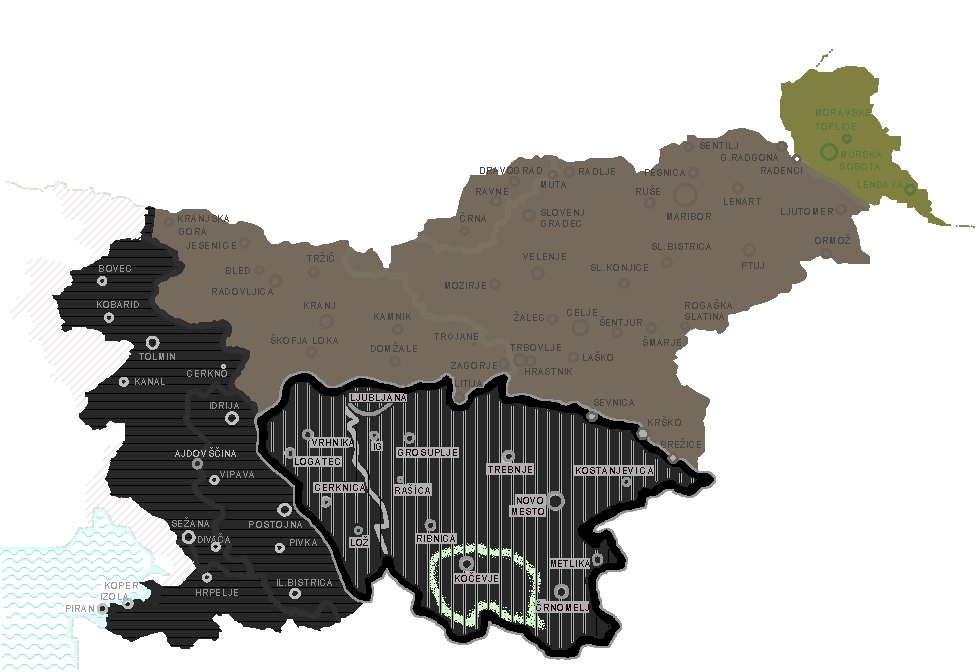
The Province of Ljubljana on a map of modern Slovenia. The province is shown by the vertical lined area in the south.

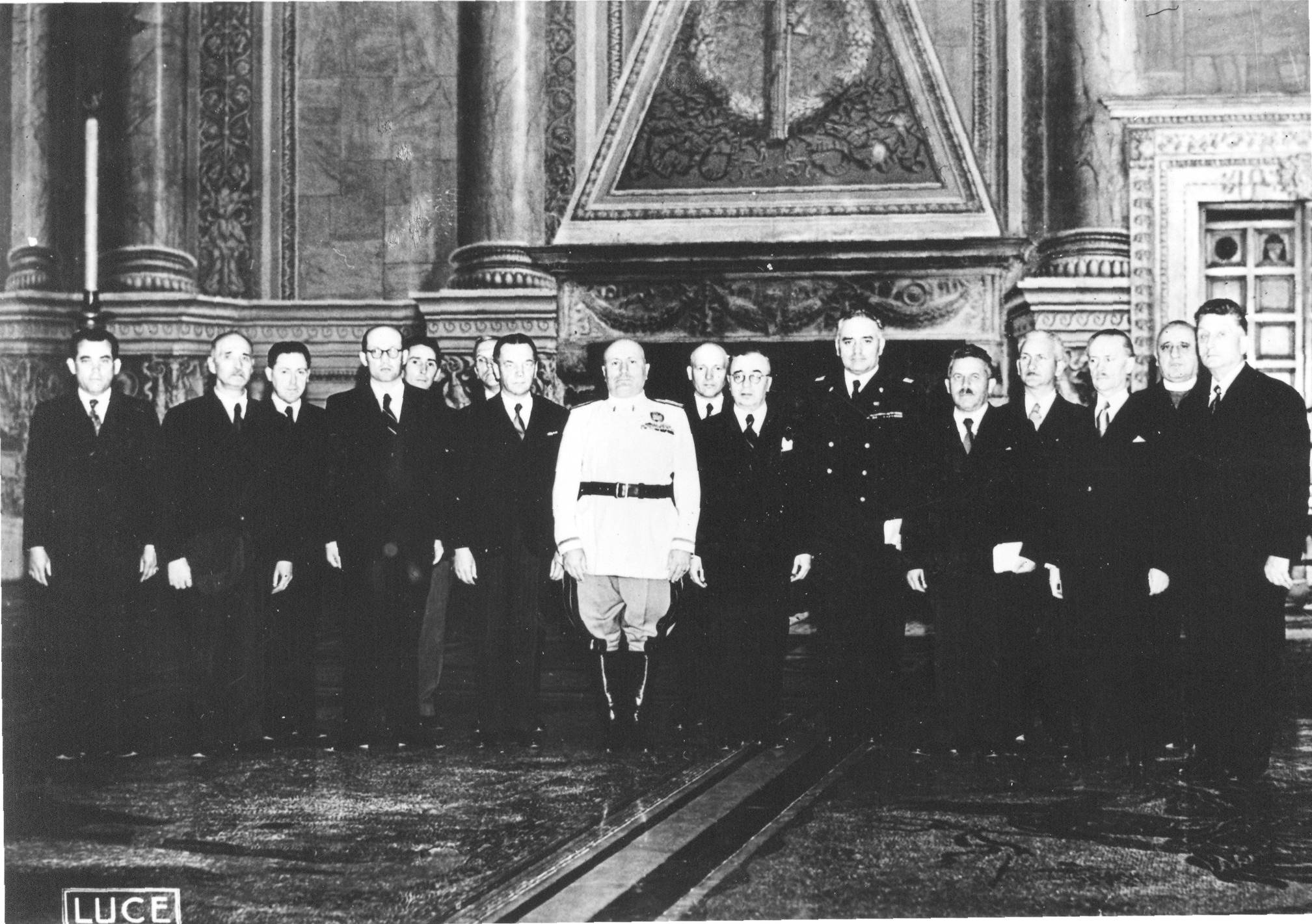
Marko Natlačen and Slovene politicians meet with Mussolini, 8 June 1941

In April 1941, the Kingdom of Yugoslavia was invaded by the Axis powers, quickly overrun and carved up. Those areas of Yugoslavia that now form the country of Slovenia were annexed by Germany, Italy and Hungary. The Italians annexed southern Slovene territories with a population of 336,279, as the Province of Ljubljana. Italian annexation troops, the XI Army Corps, secured the new province, introduced fascist laws, and an Italian civilian high commissioner was appointed.

The influential Roman Catholic Bishop of Ljubljana, Gregorij Rožman, and in-country prewar politicians, led by Marko Natlačen, immediately expressed their willingness to collaborate with the fascist authorities, writing public letters of support for the annexation of Ljubljana Province to Italy. On 8 June 1941, Natlačen led Slovene politicians and industrialists to meet with Mussolini in Rome, after which they reiterated their loyalty, and started officially collaborating with the Italians in the Consulta, a supposedly consultative body, that had no power.

Much of the prewar police force and public administration continued to work for the new Fascist authorities.

=== Resistance begins ===
Soon after the annexation, several resistance groups emerged, including the communist-led Liberation Front of the Slovene Nation (Slovene: Osvobodilna fronta slovenskega naroda), or simply Liberation Front (Osvobodilna fronta, OF) raised armed units and engaged in sabotage and active resistance. The OF consisted of eighteen distinct groupings, including the Communist Party of Slovenia, quite a large number of members of the Christian Socialist Party, some members of the gymnastic body Sokol, various progressive intellectuals, some former Royal Yugoslav Army officers, and even some members of the strongly-Catholic Slovene People's Party. These bodies varied in origin, ideology and strength, but were united in their policy of immediate armed resistance to the annexation forces. The communist-led group was initially inactive when the Axis forces invaded Yugoslavia because of the Nazi–Soviet nonaggression pact; this position changed to one of resistance to the Axis forces after 22 June 1941, when Germany invaded the Soviet Union. The communist-led group was active in May 1941, on 8 June 1941 and on 15 June 1941 by publishing criticisms against the occupation and the German occupiers, as well as against the Americans and the British, in their publication Slovenski poročevalec. During the same time, most Slovene newspapers wrote favourably about the occupation out of fear or by being directly controlled by the occupiers.

The anti-communist, anti-fascist resistance groups were the first group to start resisting the occupiers, which including Germany, Italy and Hungary. Slovenia was assimilated by Nazi Germany, which meant that most resistance was underground.

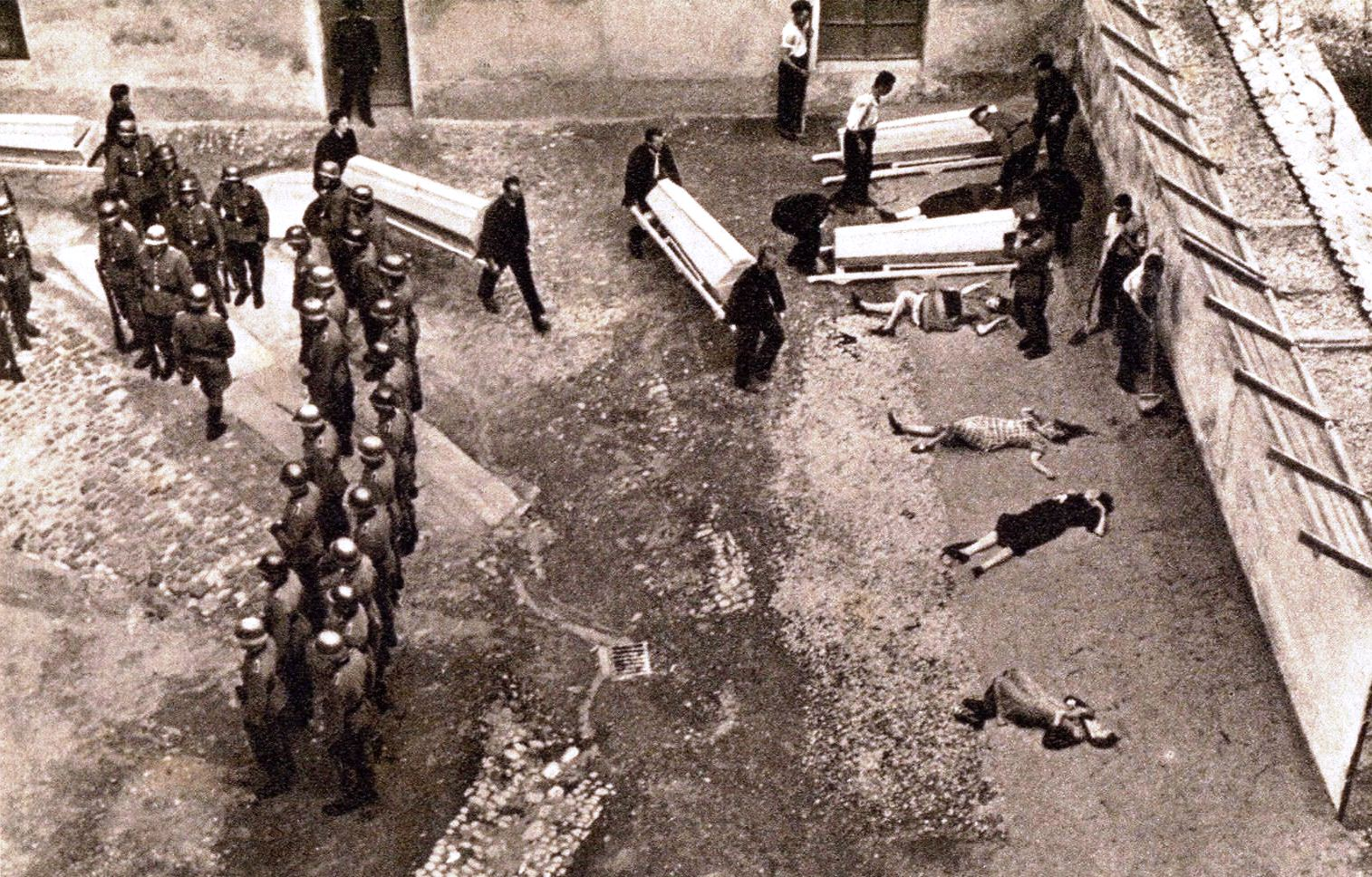
German troops on 21 July 1941, executing some of the 374 Slovene hostages they executed in Celje, among them 49 women.

These underground groups organized themselves on the basis that they would form the core of resistance against the Italians and the Germans at some time in the future. These groups generally considered immediate resistance to be pointless given the overwhelming enemy, and that it would be too expensive in terms of lives, property and suffering. Instead, they create intelligence divisions that would provide essential intelligence about German military movements to the Allies. They also planned for the arrival of Allied troops in the region, and trained their troops so they could join the Allies in their battle against the Germans.

In this they reflected the same approach as the Chetnik leader in the German-occupied territory of Serbia, Draža Mihailović. Some of these groups had a pro-Western stance, but others were pro-Axis, as the number of active collaborators with the Italians testified. The main part of the Slovene People's Party formed the Slovene Legion, the Yugoslav National Party and the majority of Sokol formed the Sokol Legion, and another group that was formed was the National Legion. All of these latter organizations tried to position themselves to take advantage of whatever outcome resulted from the war. These pro-democracy, pro-allied groups were collectively called the pejorative term "White Guards" (Slovene: Bela garda) to the OF.

The pro-Western groups sought the re-establishment of Yugoslavia and, in common with the communists, the expansion of Yugoslavia to include those Slovene lands that had been annexed by Italy or remained part of Austria after World War I.

The leadership of the OF lay in the hands of several communists, Boris Kidrič, Edvard Kardelj, and Franc Leskošek. In August, the OF created the Security and Intelligence Service (Slovene: Varnostno-obveščevalna služba, VOS) to coordinate resistance activities. This was a small and select secret police organisation, led by Zdenka Kidrič, Boris Kidrič's wife. Although it was part of the OF, the VOS was under exclusive communist control.

During the second half of 1941, there was no active resistance by any group to the occupiers. At that time, the OF began killing civilians in the city of Ljubljana, and also in the countryside. The OF developed an underground organisation in Ljubljana and in the countryside, and the Partisans conducted attacks on Italian forces and sabotaged important targets from July. The Italians retaliated against the OF and against the civilian population, conducting operations in the late summer and early autumn that destroyed or broke up many of the Partisan companies and caused losses to others. The non-OF groups made contact with Mihailović and planned to provide recruits for his "Yugoslav Army in the Homeland" during a future uprising against the Italians.

Setbacks to the OF, followed by the onset of a severe and early winter, meant that the Partisans gained little ground until early 1942. In December, the VOS began a campaign against Slovenes who were collaborating with the Italians, assassinating several prominent leaders.

=== Resurgence and reaction ===
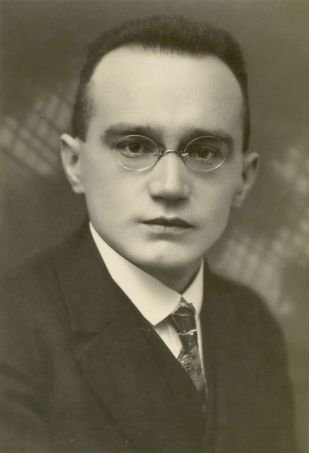
Miha Krek was the leader of the Slovene People's Party.

Early in 1942, Partisan Supreme Headquarters directed the Slovene Partisans to re-develop its depleted units and increase attacks and sabotage. This order resulted in a spate of Partisan operations in April–June in the Province of Ljubljana. These operations occurred at the same time that the Italians were concentrating their many small, weak and widely-spread garrisons into larger bases under Plan Primavera. The Partisans were thus able to effectively extend their control to over half of the province and population, and expand their recruiting and number and size of their units. The Partisans' success in mid-1942 meant that the Italians were even more committed to combating them, and the non-OF forces sought to find an effective way to collaborate with the Italians in order to fight the Partisans. By early 1942, the non-OF forces had concluded that the OF was working towards a communist takeover of Yugoslavia, which made the OF a far greater threat to them than the Italians, especially if the Allies prevailed. Likewise, the Partisans realised that the non-OF forces were their main enemy. These realisations resulted in bitter enmity between the two groups and started a civil war.

The non-OF forces then made a series of proposals to the Italians, aimed at opposing the objectives of the OF and Partisans. They also established the Slovene Alliance (Slovene: Slovenska zaveza) to coordinate their anti-Partisan policies. The alliance was dominated by the Slovene People's Party, with its Slovene Legion. The leader of the Slovene People's Party, Miha Krek, who was vice-premier in the Yugoslav government-in-exile in London, broadcast messages urging all members of the alliance to follow the orders of Mihailović, who was by this time the Minister of Army, Navy and Air Force in the government-in-exile, despite being physically located in occupied Yugoslavia. In May 1942, clandestine recruiting and organisation of the first Slovene anti-Partisan forces began. Initially this effort was very small, and included members of the Slovene, Sokol and National Legions, as well as a number of Major Karl Novak's Slovene Chetniks. This organisation was known as the Legion of Death. Whilst small initially, once this force was raised, it became critical to obtain Italian endorsement for its operation.

=== Armed collaboration begins ===
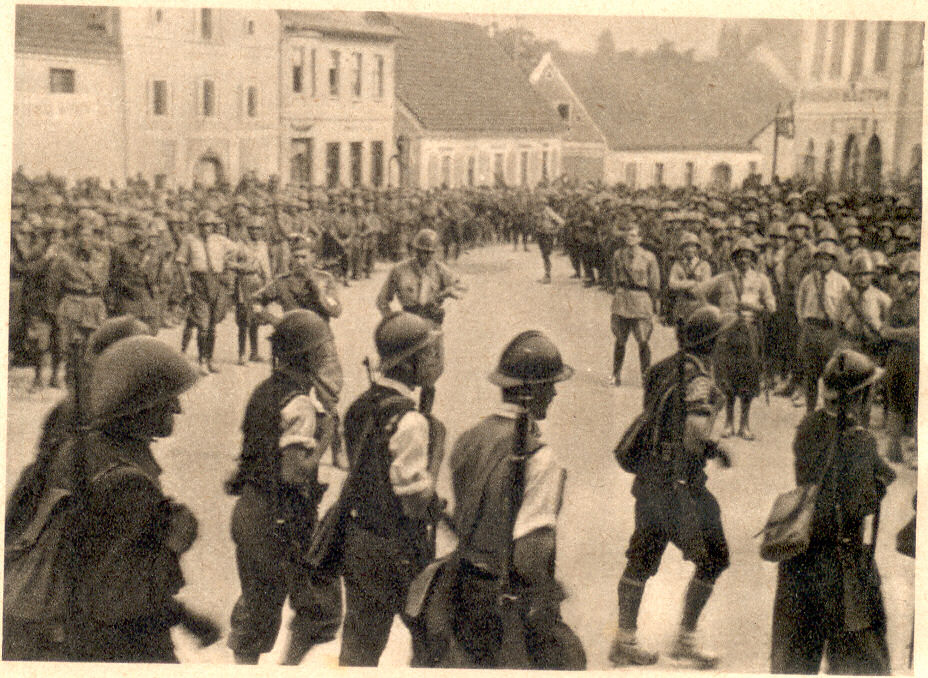
Members of the Village Guards, part of the MVAC, train under Italian supervision.

Emblem of MVAC units

Units of the Legion of Death informally collaborated with Italian units during a major Italian offensive against the Partisans that commenced in the second half of July 1942 and continued through to early November. Impressed with the potential of such units, and with the approval of the Italian leader, Benito Mussolini, the Italians decided to accept the offer of the Slovene Alliance, and to enrol the anti-Partisan units as auxiliaries. In early August, the Italians directed that all existing and future Slovene anti-Partisan units would be incorporated into the Anti-Communist Volunteer Militia (Italian: Milizia Volontaria Anti Comunista, MVAC). In the same month, armed units in rural areas were formed into the Village Guards (Slovene: Vaške straže), which was also included in the MVAC, and ultimately became the largest grouping among the Italian auxiliaries.

MVAC growth was greatly aided by the letter Bishop Rožman sent to Italian General Mario Robotti, in September, 1942, wherein Rožman proposed the creation of a Slovene collaborationist army and police force, under Italian command, to help fight Partisans and track down their supporters. MVAC forces participated in the brutal Italian offensive of Summer-Fall 1942, when 80,000 well-armed Italian troops, attacked 3,000 poorly-armed Partisan forces, killing half of them, shooting all prisoners they found with arms. With MVAC help, the Italians ultimately sent to concentration camps 30,000 Slovenes, nearly 10% of the population of Ljubljana Province, including thousands of women and children, and where thousands died. The Italian army shot thousands of additional Slovene civilians as hostages, surrounded Ljubljana and other cities with barbed-wire, forbade entry and exit. In Ljubljana, MVAC units conducted the "Christmas raids" in December 1942, arresting 550 suspected Liberation Front members, many sent to concentration camps.

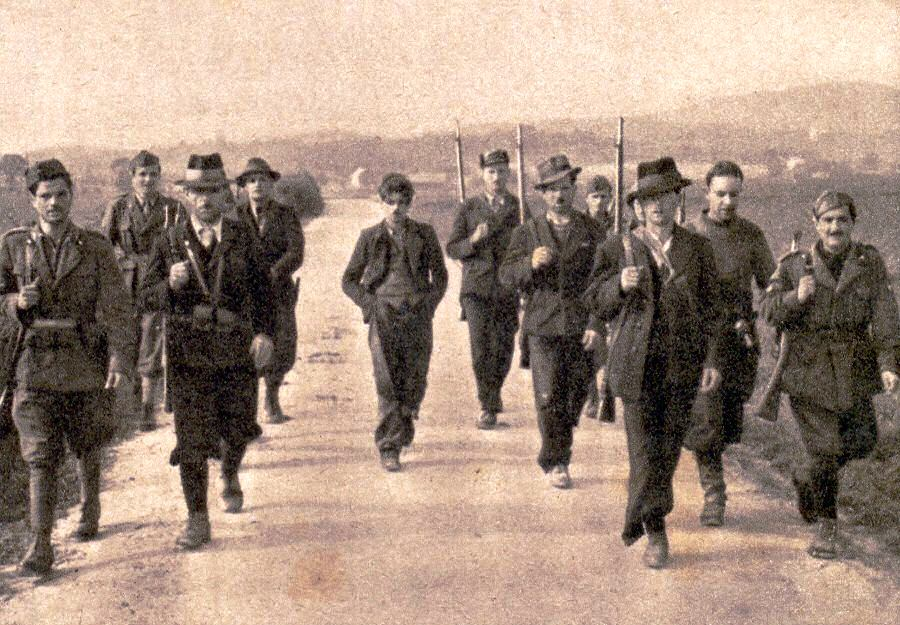
MVAC Village Guards and Italian soldiers escorting a hostage to jointly execute him

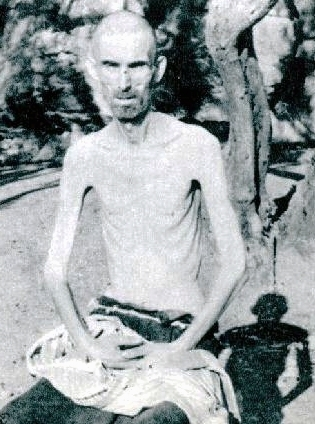
Prisoner at Rab, one of the Italian concentration camps in which 30,000 Slovenes were interred, with the help of collaborators

By the end of September, MVAC units in the province numbered some 2,219 armed men. Each unit had one or more Italian liaison officers attached to it. This rapid growth was driven by the close alignment of the MVAC with the Catholic Church at all levels, along with the Slovene Alliance viewing the MVAC as a simple method by which to legalise a large number of its members, whilst also gaining arms, ammunition, food and pay from the Italians. Members of the Sokol and National Legions were also absorbed into the MVAC for the same reasons. Following Partisan reverses in the Italian offensive that commenced in July, and the loss of Partisan territory, many Slovenes considered them defeated and were drawn towards collaboration. During 1942, at the urging of the Slovene People's Party, around 600 anti-Partisan former Royal Yugoslav Army prisoners-of-war (POWs) were released from Italian camps, returned to the province, and enlisted in the MVAC. One of these, Lieutenant Colonel Ernest Peterlin, was appointed to command the MVAC unit in Ljubljana which was formed in October. By the following month, the MVAC had 4,471 men under arms.

While the MVAC included some members of the Sokol Legion and many former POWs, the dominant force within it was the Slovene Legion, and through it, the Slovene People's Party. However, the non-OF political forces remained splintered, and the various other armed forces tried to maintain their identity within the MVAC. This division within the non-OF forces made the work of the OF easier. However, the communist-led OF made many mistakes before and during the 1942 Italian offensive which eroded their chances of gaining the allegiance of those who were uncommitted to either the OF or non-OF forces. Among these were leftist errors, which involved the use of terror against real and alleged collaborators, and those who, due to their social class, were considered future opponents of the OF, such as wealthier peasants. The OF also made a number of military mistakes, mainly due to lack of experience or poor leadership. The Partisans sought to rectify their mistakes, and by November 1942 had recovered to a significant extent and concluded that destruction of the MVAC forces must be their first priority.

Italian officers, among them general Roatta, criticized the MVAC's poor discipline, stating they "resembled goon-squads", were "insubordinate and rowdy" and pillaged. Speaking to Rožman in the autumn of 1942, Italian general Vittorio Ruggero warned Rožman: "I am not Slovenian, but this is how I see Slovenes and their struggle: the MVAC units help us Italians a lot ... but among you Slovenes they create such hatred that you will not be able to eliminate it for fifty years."

=== Collapse of Italian rule ===
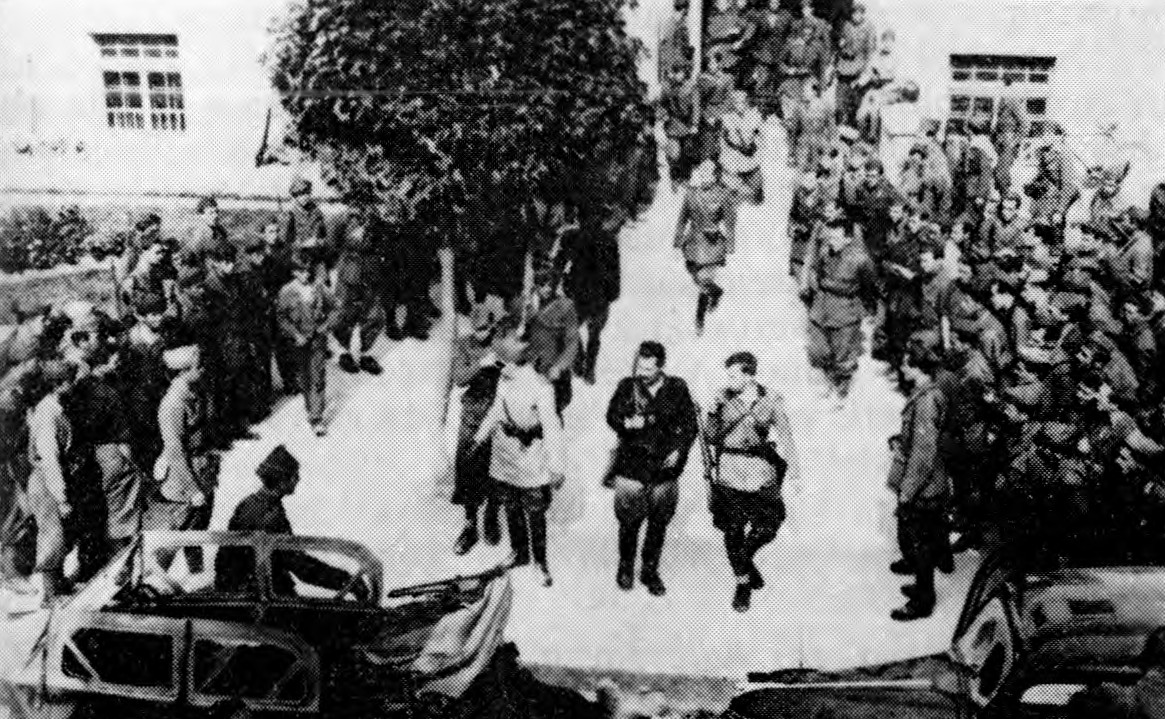
Partisan commanders at negotiations with Italians, for the Italian surrender, 10 September 1943

In February 1943, the OF held a conference which resulted in the Dolomite Declaration, a statement that smoothed over the internal conflicts within the OF that had resulted from the leftist errors. The practical effect of the Declaration was that the OF ceased to be a coalition and became a front organisation for the Communist Party of Slovenia. From early 1943, the Italians became steadily weaker, and were less capable of conducting large-scale operations against the Partisans. This weakness was exacerbated by the losses of the Italian Army in the Soviet Union and the landing of Anglo-American forces in North Africa in 1942, a worsening relationship with the Germans, increasing economic problems in Italy, and the Allied invasion of Sicily and the ousting of Mussolini in July 1943. By this time, increasing numbers of the Slovene population were joining the Partisans as the prospects of their victory grew.

In February 1943, Novak, Mihailović's chief representative in the province, having tried for many months to get the Slovene Alliance to place some of their forces under his command, formed his own collaborationist militia, known as the Blue Guards (Slovene: Plava garda) but also referred to as the Slovene Chetniks. However, this unit never grew larger than 400 troops, and because Novak had no political base in Slovenia, it was never a significant military or political force. After the war, Novak claimed that the Blue Guards had armed encounters with Italian troops and gathered intelligence on the Italians for Mihailović, but according to the historian Jozo Tomasevich the first claim is groundless as the Italians allocated an operational zone to Novak's principal unit and indirectly provided it with supplies, and its size and restrictions on its movement precluded the gathering of much useful intelligence. However, that opinion is contradicted by a CIA memo released in 2007. The CIA memo states that Novak's group provided a large amount of very useful intelligence, about both German and Italian military movements around Slovenia, directly to the Allied command in Cairo, through the use of daily radio transmissions.

With the pending collapse of the Italians, those that had been collaborating with them were faced with difficult choices: trying to join the Western Allies if they landed in the Slovene Littoral; coming to an arrangement with the Partisans; or preparing to tactically collaborate with the Germans in order to keep fighting the Partisans. Given the political views of the anti-communists, unless the Western Allies landed on the coast, the only viable option remaining was to tactically collaborate with the Germans. For their part, the Partisans, whilst continuing to attack Italian and MVAC units in July and August 1943, began to strengthen and conserve their forces to take advantage in the aftermath of the Italian collapse. Partisans also collaborated tactically with both the Italians and the Germans on numerous occasions. Italy surrendered on 8 September.

== Establishment and operations ==
=== Aftermath of the Italian surrender ===
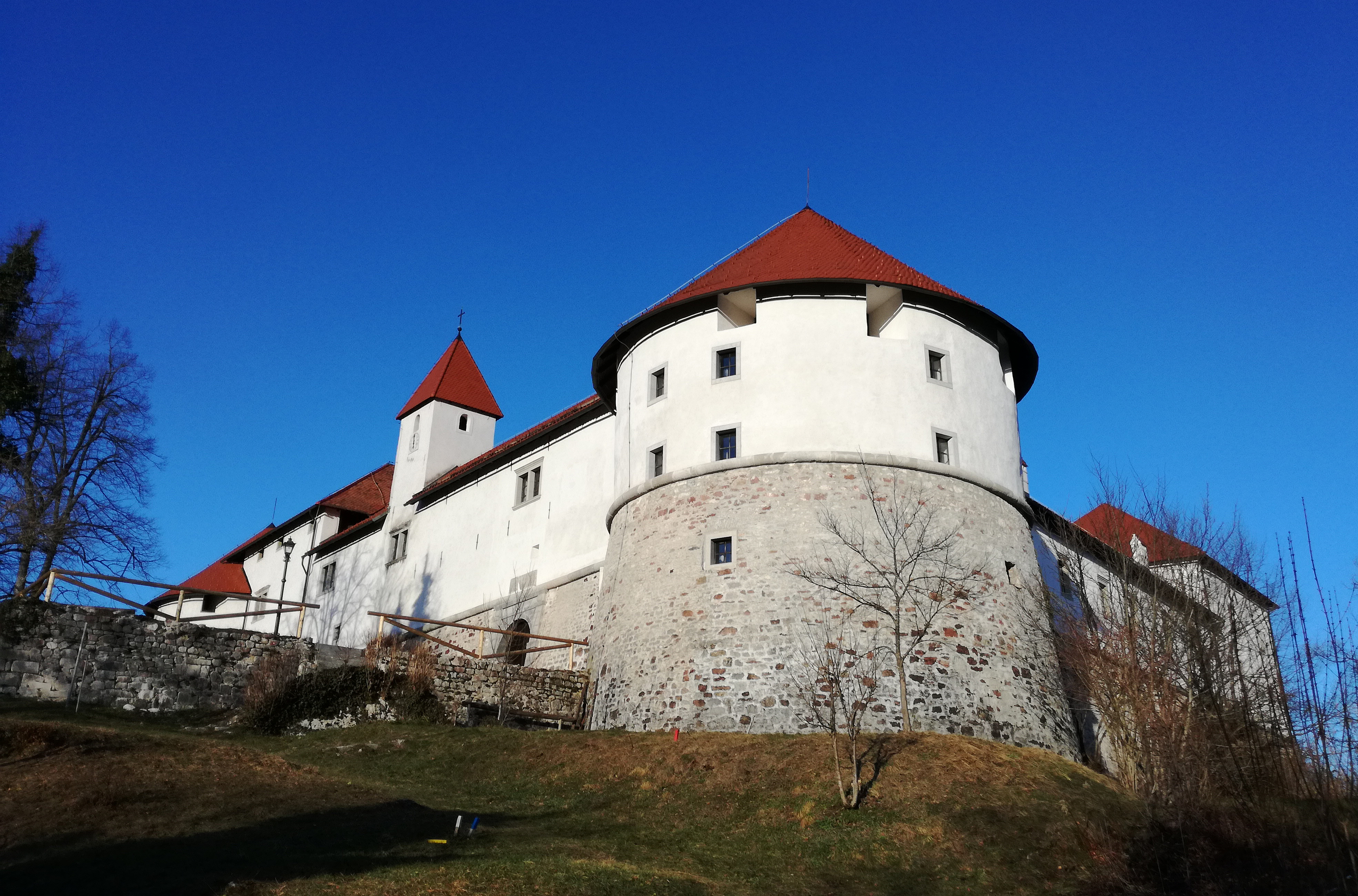
A large MVAC force concentrated at Turjak Castle in the aftermath of the Italian surrender

At the time that the Italians surrendered, the Italians had about 50,000 troops in the province, assisted by 6,049 MVAC soldiers and 300–400 Slovene Chetniks. The Partisans fielded around 3,000 men, although there were many more in non-combat organisations. About half of Novak's Chetniks, anticipating an Allied landing in the Slovene Littoral, moved south to meet reinforcements that they were expecting to arrive from the Lika region of the neighboring Independent State of Croatia. Partisan units attacked the Chetnik force, pushing them southwest to the village of Grčarice, about 55 kilometres (34 mi) south-southeast of Ljubljana. At the same time, the former MVAC units, now renamed the Slovene National Army, and part of Mihailović's "Yugoslav Army in the Homeland", concentrated a large force of around 1,600 men at Turjak Castle, 20 kilometres (12 mi) south-southeast of Ljubljana. The force at Turjak had considerable ammunition and food supplies. Partisan forces were moving in the same direction as the collaborationists, with orders to disarm Italian troops and capture or destroy any Chetnik or MVAC forces they encountered. The Partisans aimed to inflict as much damage as possible on the former Italian auxiliaries to make them of less value to the Germans when they took over. These Partisan units managed to recruit some Italians to join them, including some equipped with tanks and artillery.

At both locations, a breakdown in command and communication occurred. The Chetniks decided to stay at Grčarice expecting reinforcements to arrive, and about two-thirds of the men at Turjak, between 695 and 750 in total, elected to remain at the castle until assistance arrived from Ljubljana. They were joined by 26 Catholic priests and seminarians. The remainder of the Slovene National Army troops at Turjak withdrew to the village of Zapotok, about 3–4 kilometres (1.9–2.5 mi) west of Turjak. There they were joined by elements of other former MVAC units and two small Chetnik detachments. On 9–10 September, a Partisan brigade, supported by two Italian howitzers, overran the Chetniks at Grčarice. Four days later, the Partisans completely encircled Turjak Castle, and after their surrender demands were rejected, besieged the castle for five days, again using captured heavy weapons against the defenders until they capitulated. During this period, the Partisans also captured other MVAC troops, including some of those located at Zapotok. The rest withdrew towards Ljubljana, suffering devastating losses, where they were disarmed by the newly arrived Germans. Boris Kidrič stated the Partisans had captured about 1,200 collaborationist troops by 21 September. A small number were charged with war crimes and shot, while the rest were allocated to labour units in preparation for integration into Partisan units.

There is a great deal of controversy regarding the fate of the collaborationist troops captured at Grčarice and Turjak. According to Partisan records, a total of 115 former MVAC troops and Chetniks were sentenced to death, and others were shot trying to escape from work units. Anti-Partisan sources claim that up to 1,000 were killed. Given the tendencies of both sides to either minimise or inflate these figures to their own ends, it remains unclear how many collaborationist troops were killed following capture. Disgusted with his dealings with the Slovene Alliance, and following the defeat at Grčarice, Novak disbanded his remaining troops and escaped to Italy in late September. Of the approximately 6,500 collaborationist troops present in the province at the time of the Italian surrender, about 500 were killed fighting the Partisans in the immediate aftermath of the capitulation, about 3,000 were captured, and about 1,000 agreed to join the Partisans. The remaining 2,000 were still in the field, although they were quickly disarmed by the Germans. The aftermath of the Italian surrender was devastating for the collaborationist forces, not only due to their losses, but also due to the large amounts of Italian arms and equipment captured by the Partisans, which allowed a substantial increase in their forces.

=== German occupation ===
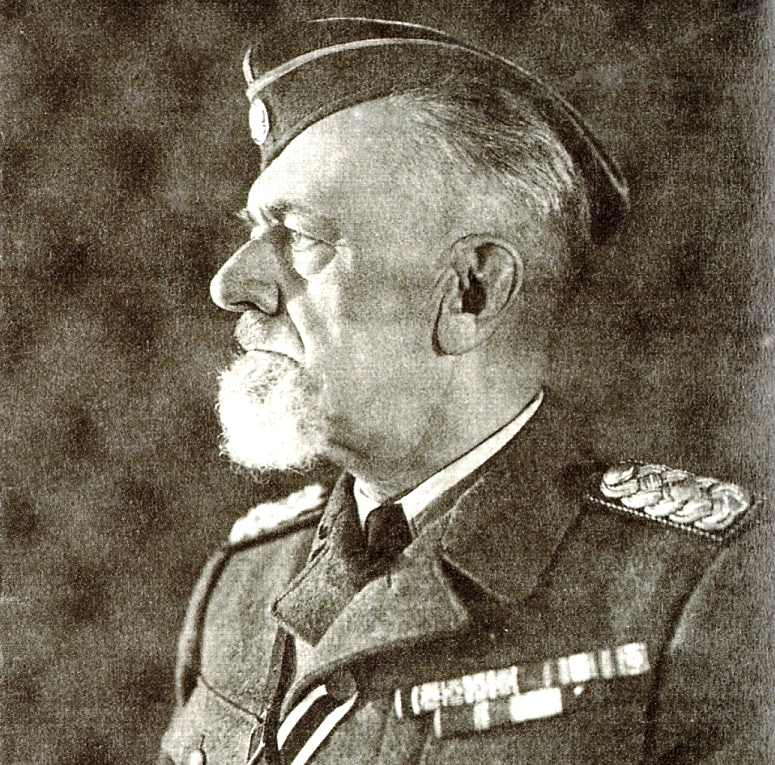
Armijski đeneral Leon Rupnik, the president of the collaborationist provincial government under the Germans

At the time of the Italian surrender, the Germans had occupied the Province of Ljubljana as part of Operation Achse, the plan to disarm the Italians in case they signed an armistice with the Allies. Two weeks prior to the surrender, the Germans had moved in a regiment of the 71st Infantry Division to secure Ljubljana and the Ljubljana–Postojna railway line that ran towards Trieste on the Adriatic coast. Over the period 9–14 September, they moved in additional troops, including elements of the SS, police and gendarmerie. Their initial aim was to secure the main lines of communication that passed through the province. The areas previously part of the province were incorporated into the Operational Zone of the Adriatic Littoral under the overall control of the Gauleiter of Reichsgau Kärnten, SS-Obergruppenführer Friedrich Rainer, who was appointed Reich Defense Commissioner for the zone. The designation of this area as an operational zone was to ensure that military needs were prioritised.

From September until early November 1943, the zone was the responsibility of Army Group B under Generalfeldmarschall Erwin Rommel. After Army Group B was sent to Western Europe in November, the zone came under the command of General der Gebirgstruppe Ludwig Kübler as part of Army Group C of Generalfeldmarschall Albert Kesselring. From September 1944, the forces in the zone were organised as LXXXXVII Army Corps under Kübler, and remained under Kesselring's overall command until April 1945, when the corps was transferred to the Commander-in-chief in Southeast Europe, Generaloberst Alexander Löhr. Rainer divided the zone into six provinces, of which Ljubljana was one. In Ljubljana Province, Rainer appointed Leon Rupnik as president of the provincial government. Rupnik was a pre-war Yugoslav general, and had been mayor of Ljubljana under the Italians. In addition to his military experience and previous collaboration with the Italians, Rupnik was also recommended by Gregorij Rožman, Catholic Bishop of Ljubljana.

The main German occupation "advisor", and Rupnik's effective superior, was the Higher SS and Police Leader for SS-Oberabschnitt Alpenland, SS-Obergruppenführer Erwin Rösener, who was directly responsible to Reichsführer-SS Heinrich Himmler. As well as supervising Rupnik and his administration, Rösener had responsibility for combating the Partisans in the province, as well as in the Slovene lands that had been annexed by Germany in April 1941. Rösener controlled the Sicherheitsdienst (Security Service), and Sicherheitspolizei (Security Police), who were responsible for political and security work in the province. The provincial department of these services controlled local political police, headed by Rupnik's delegate and former Ljubljana police chief, Lovro Hacin. The Germans understood the previous relationship between the collaborationist forces and the Italians, and wanted to establish a similar arrangement to supplement their limited manpower. This intent coincided with that of the anti-Partisan forces, who were under a greater threat from the Partisans after the Italian surrender.

=== Formation ===
Immediately after the Germans took control, Rösener suggested to Rupnik that he organise a new anti-Partisan force in the province. On 24 September, Rupnik issued a call for volunteers, published in main Slovene Catholic newspaper, Slovenec, thus describing the goals of the Slovene Home Guard:

"Our beloved Slovenian homeland was to be handed over to Bolshevism with the help of the Anglo-American plutocracy. ... a tragedy that has plunged our good, hardworking and pious people into suffering, violence, famine, robbery and murder by ungodly and heartless servants as well as dishonorable aides working to benefit Jewish world tyranny. To prevent this, a Great German war force has come to us at the command of the Führer to protect us ... Under the leadership of Germany, the young nations of Europe will defeat Bolshevism and capitalism."

Members of three former MVAC units that had escaped destruction in the aftermath of the Italian surrender came forward, and by 1 October, 1,000 troops were enrolled in the new Slovene Home Guard (Slovene: Slovensko domobranstvo, SD). The new force initially comprised three battalions totalling 2,000 men, based on the previous MVAC units. Shortly after Rupnik began recruiting for the SD, Rösener took over the SD organisation, created a headquarters staff to control it, and split it into organisational and propaganda departments. Royal Yugoslav Army officers of Slovene background with previous MVAC experience were placed in charge, but under close German supervision. In particular, those with close links to the Slovene People's Party, Village Guards and Slovene Legion were preferred. Rupnik had no control over the SD, even after he was appointed inspector-general in September 1944. Even in this role, he was only involved with recruiting and training.

=== Re-organisations ===
After it was formed, the SD was organised into 43 infantry companies as local garrisons for population centres, with 20 more grouped into the battalions. It also had engineers, signals, medical and labour companies, and four artillery batteries. A separate company operated five armoured trains. The battalions were re-organised several times. By October 1943, there were five battalions, but the 4th Battalion was a training unit. In December, conscription was imposed, which helped bring the total strength of the SD to 10,500. With this increased strength, the battalions were reformed into seven combat groups (Slovene: Bojna Skupina 1–7) and two training groups.

On 25 February 1944, the SD underwent a further re-organisation into four groups (Slovene: Skupine): the 1st Training Group, formed from the 1st Combat Group; the 2nd Railway Security Group, comprising the former 4th and 5th Combat Groups; the 3rd Operational Group, formed from the 2nd, 6th and 7th Combat Groups, and including the Assault Battalion Kriz; and the 4th Novo Mesto Protection Group. On 16 May, the SD, now totalling 12,000, was split up across four operational zones. Each zone formed an assault battalion. On 5 July, the zones were named for the four cardinal directions, and a single battalion was formed in each. A fifth battalion was raised in August, and a sixth in March 1945. However, in December 1944, as Slovene desertions were increasing, the German 14th and 17th SS Police Regiments detached a company to join each SD battalion except the 2nd Battalion, and German officers took command of each battalion. The final re-organisation occurred on 28 March 1945, when the battalions were renumbered; 1st Battalion remained unchanged, 2nd Battalion became the 5th Battalion, 4th Battalion was renamed as the 2nd Battalion, the 5th Battalion became the 6th, and the 6th Battalion was renamed as the 10th Battalion. At this point there was also a 12th Battalion.

While the Germans were busy re-organizing the SD, the National Committee for Slovenia secretly reorganized all of the anti-communist armies in Slovenia, and created a new army called the Slovenian National Army (SNV) whose allegiance was with the King of Yugoslavia. Unbeknownst to the Germans, the SNV was loyal to the King and remained anti-Nazi while its members continued to spy on the German army and report its movements to the Allies.

=== Collaboration with the Germans ===
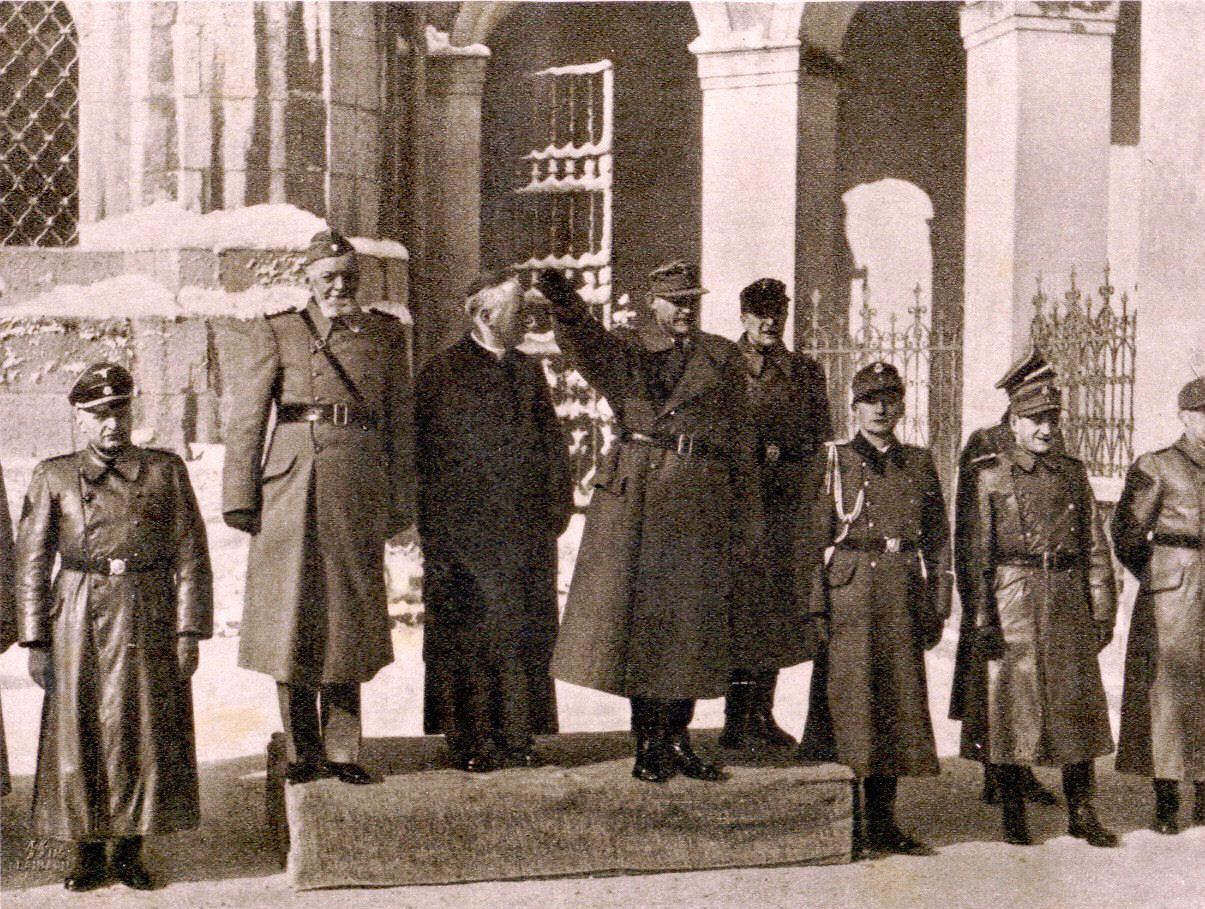
SD Inspector-General Leon Rupnik, SS-General Erwin Rösener and Bishop Gregorij Rožman inspect Slovene Home Guard troops, after the second oath of allegiance, 30 January 1945.

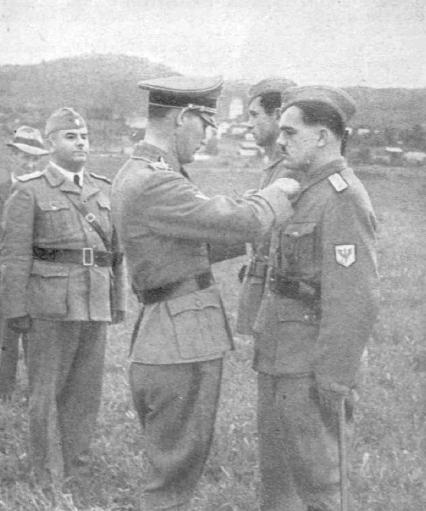
SS Lieutenant-General Rösener giving medals to Home Guard soldiers

Marching into the Province of Ljubljana in September 1943 on the heels of the capitulating Italians, the Germans hoped quickly to re-establish order and pacify this strategic central European communication and transportation nexus. Instead they were absorbed, willingly or not, into a pre-existing vicious civil war between the Communist-led resistance force, the Osvobodilna fronta (OF – Liberation Front), and their anti-Communist opponents, many of whom had collaborated with the Italians.

==== Oaths of allegiance ====
In both 1943, when the SD was established, and again in 1945, when the SD was merged into the newly created Slovenian National Army (Slovenska Narodna Vojska SNV) by the National Committee for Slovenia, members took oaths to King Peter in support of the Kingdom of Yugoslavia. The oath taken by the members between February and April 1945, read as follows: "I swear to Almighty to be faithful to the Supreme Commander of the SNV, King Peter II, addicted and faithful with my whole soul, to the Slovene nation, to fight heroically for the Slovene nation and its allies, and for the Kingdom of Yugoslavia, that I never would betray the military banner, to obey and faithfully carry out orders, given by superior military authorities appointed by the National Committee for Slovenia, So help me God."

On Hitler's birthday, 20 April 1944, members of the SD took an oath to fight together with the SS and German police under the leadership of the Führer, Adolf Hitler, against the Communist guerrillas and their allies. This meant that the SD had sworn an oath to fight against the Soviet Union and Western Allies. Members of the SD took this oath under duress and had reservations about it, but the oath made them suspect from the perspective of the Western Allies. The SD swore a second oath of allegiance on 30 January 1945, the anniversary of the Nazis coming to power. After the oath, the SD Inspector-General, Leon Rupnik, gave a viciously antisemitic speech to the SD troops, calling the Jews, "led by Satan himself", their main enemy, along with the Jews' supporters, the Bolsheviks from the East and the "wealthy gangsters from the West" – all this fully reproduced in the main Slovene Catholic newspaper. The reason the Germans mandated this oath be given under duress is that it had caught a number of SD members spying on them and sending secret reports of German military movements to the British.

==== SD command and organization ====
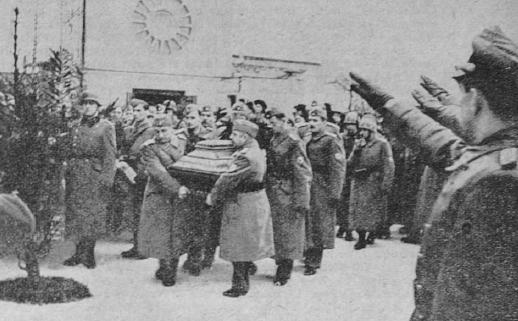
Home Guards at the funeral of SD commander Dušan Meničanin, killed in battle with Partisans near Novo Mesto

The SD operated under the command of SS Lieutenant-General Rösener, who, in turn, reported directly to SS Chief, Heinrich Himmler. The SD was initially grouped into companies and battalions, but the Germans re-organised it several times. Towards the end of the war, German officers commanded several battalions, and some units had a mix of Slovene and German soldiers. According to sources close to the SD, by September 1944 the numbers enlisted reached 13,000. The SD were armed, supplied and paid by the Germans, and when deployed in the field, were always under German command. The SD used Italian equipment (confiscated after the Italian Armistice in September 1943), and weapons, uniforms and equipment supplied by the Germans, especially later in the war.

==== SD role in German war effort ====
In its aims and ideology, the SD was anti-Partisan, anti-communist. It had limited autonomy, and at first functioned as an auxiliary police force that assisted the Germans in anti-Partisan operations. Later, it gained more autonomy and conducted most of the anti-Partisan operations in Slovenia, while still having German officers in command. This helped the Germans by allowing them to commit more of their troops against the Allies. The Home Guard also directly assisted German war efforts against the Allies in Italy and the Balkans, by guarding critical war infrastructure – roads, railroads, bridges, electricity lines, fuel depots, etc. Home Guard propaganda urged Slovenes to join Nazi labor units in Slovenia and Germany, and captured escaped members of Nazi forced labor units. The SD supported their military actions by publishing a regular newspaper and pamphlets. Members of the SD, being pro-Allies, occasionally helped Allied airmen who had been shot down over the province. SD units also helped save downed Allied airmen and hid them from the Germans.

Over time, Rösener developed the SD into the primary anti-Partisan force in the province. In 1944 the German and the SD forces intensified their attempts to eliminate the Partisans, and total Slovene casualties greatly increased, from 16,600 killed in 1943 to 27,000 in 1944. Of these the Partisans were responsible for 2,700, or 10% of the casualties, while the German-SD forces killed the other 90%, or 24,300 Slovenes. Partisans suffered the greatest number of casualties, with 12,400 killed, followed by 5,500 civilians killed and 1,000 SD troops. With liberation approaching, the Germans sought to maintain an open corridor through Slovenia for hundreds of thousands of their troops and collaborators who were withdrawing all the way from Greece and Albania, plus the rest of Yugoslavia. Thus in these final pitched battles an additional 20,000 Slovenes were killed in 1945, prior to liberation, with the Partisans again suffering the greatest number of casualties, 8,200, followed by 6,200 Slovene civilians. Unlike auxiliary units in other Balkan territories such as the Ustaše Militia in Croatia, the SD suffered fewer desertions and defections in the last months of the war. As one curate expressed it at the time, there existed a sentiment among the SD troops that it was better to die than live under Communist rule.

==== Collaboration differences by region ====
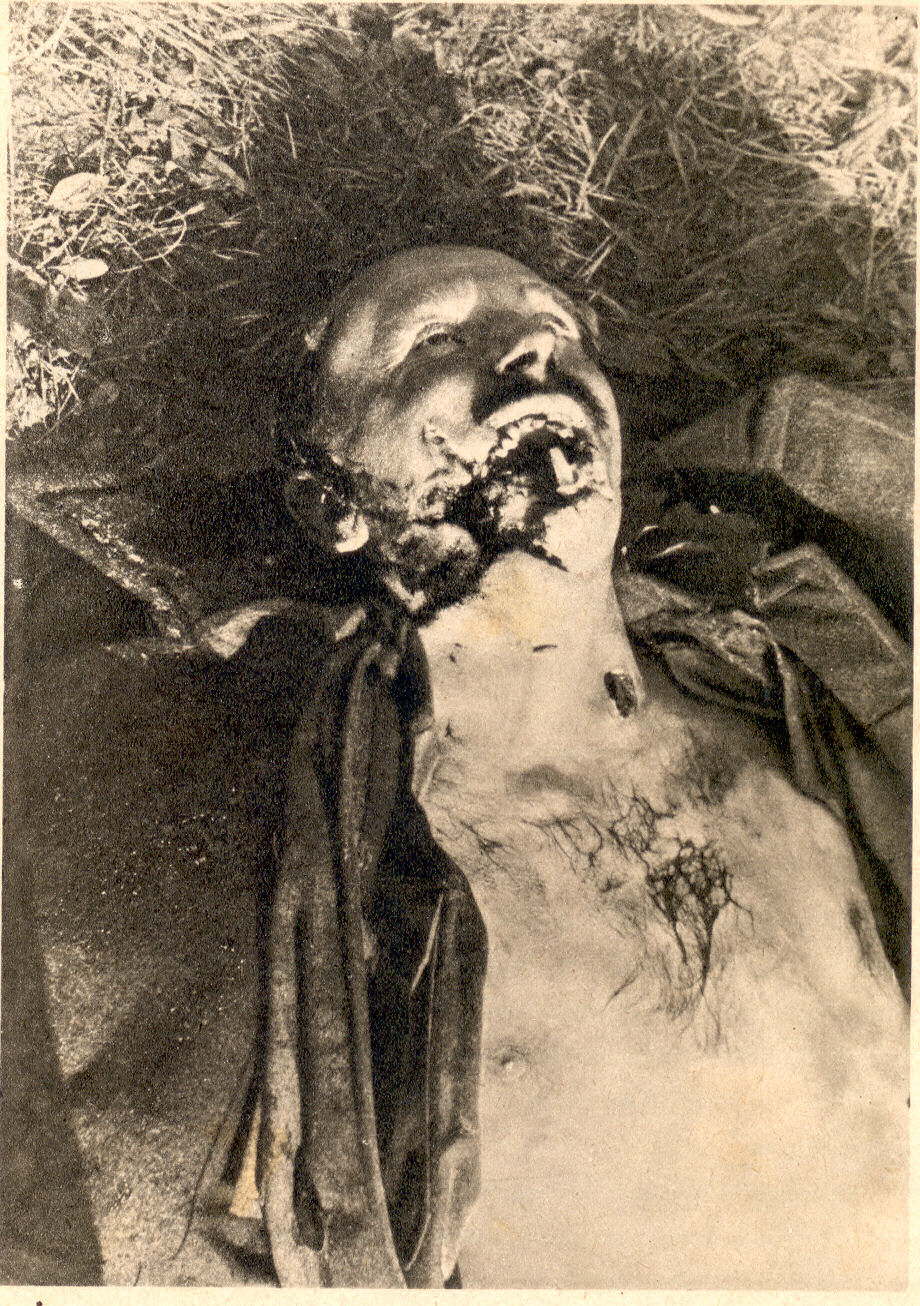
Partisan Major Josip Mirtič, killed by Home Guards in 1944 in Bela Krajina (a 5-pointed partisan star is carved into his face with bullets)

Although some 40 Catholic priests joined the Partisans and 3 served in its leadership, most of the Catholic Church in Ljubljana Province, led by Bishop Gregorij Rožman supported the SD, which helped make Ljubljana Province the epicenter of armed collaboration. By contrast, in the Primorska (Slovene Littoral), which suffered under 20 years of Fascist rule, many local priests supported the Liberation Front, and Primorska experienced much less collaboration, with only 2,000 SD-affiliated troops, commanded by officers imported from Ljubljana Province. There was also less collaboration in Štajerska (Lower Styria), where the Nazis sought to Germanize all Slovenes, brutally expelling 83.000, including nearly all teachers and priests, forbade the Slovene language in schools and public institutions, executed thousands of hostages, etc. Unlike Bishop Rožman, the Styrian Bishop of Maribor, Ivan Tomažič, remained neutral and did not support the SD. Thus partly as a result, there was not only less collaboration, but the war was less deadly in these other provinces than in Ljubljana Province, with also many fewer post-war reprisals.

==== Role of Allies ====
The philosophy of the SD and its overarching political leadership remained the same as under the Italians – to wait for an Allied landing in the Slovene Littoral, then transfer allegiance to them and attack the Germans. The Slovene People's Party leadership in the province repeatedly tried to explain their collaboration to the Yugoslav government-in-exile and to the British. They argued that the communists were a greater threat than the Germans, and that their resistance to the Partisans was forced on them by the communists. This stance was seriously undermined after the Tehran Conference of November–December 1943 which formally designated the Partisans as an Allied force and urged support for their struggle. The British liaison officers with the Slovene Partisans reinforced this disconnect, stating that the collaboration by the SD deprived the Partisans of much-needed manpower and made the task of the Germans easier, concluding "therefore the White Guards (another name for Home Guards) are declared enemies of the Allies".

In 1944, at the urging of Western Allies, Slovene members of the Yugoslav government-in-exile in London, called on the SD to transfer their allegiance to the Partisans, and recognize the Tito-Šubašić agreement, which the Allies also supported. Yet despite Partisan offers of amnesty, most SD members continued fighting against the Partisans, on the side of the Nazis, unlike many Croat Home Guards, Chetniks and other collaborationist troops who either joined the Partisans, or just stopped fighting. Some SD members continued fighting the Partisans even after the German surrender, attacking a Slovene Partisan brigade near Ferlach, Austria, on 11 May 1945, killing 180 Partisans.

=== Home Guard Police Corps ===
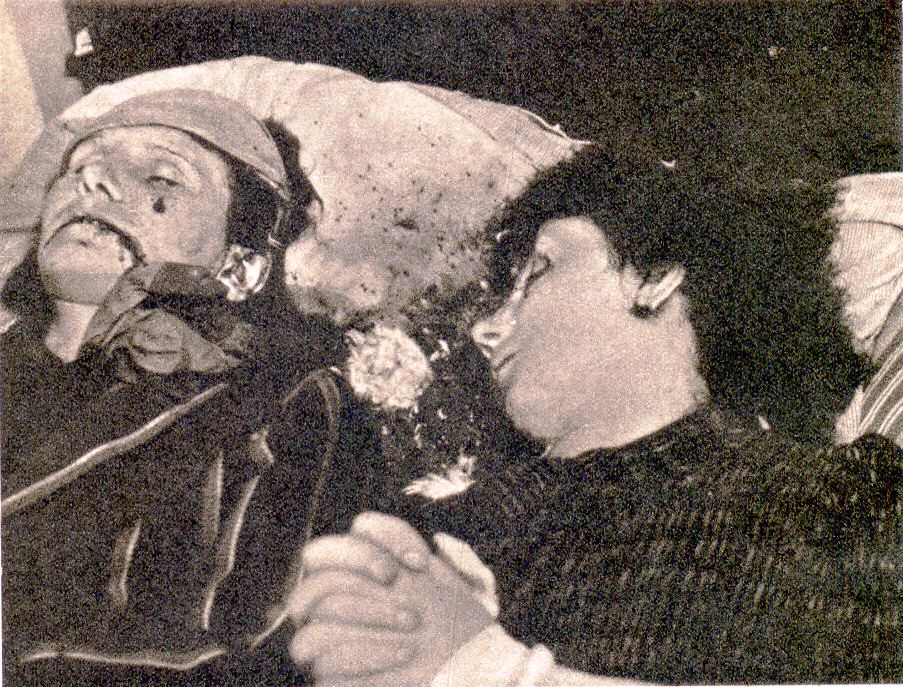
The Šusterič sisters, murdered by the Police-affiliated Black Hand organization, near Ljubljana, on 9 August 1944

The Nazis also established a Slovene Home Guard Police Corps, commanded by Lovro Hacin, the police chief in pre-war Ljubljana. The Corps had a secret branch, whose main task was to identify members of the Liberation Front and their sympathizers, as well as create lists of hostages to be shot in revenge for partisan actions. Beyond that, they spied on all members of the Provincial Administration, as well as on health care workers, teachers, university professors, industrial workers, bank employees, etc., in what became "a Slovene-administered police state".

Working with the Home Guard Army and the Gestapo, the Police Corps jailed some 6,000 political prisoners in Ljubljana Province, one-third of them women, and many more female Partisan supporters were jailed as "prostitutes". The police created lists of Slovene political prisoners to be sent to Nazi concentration camps, and assisted in their deportations. A separate, secret Police-associated organization, the Black Hand, was created to arrest, torture and kill suspected members of the Liberation Front, and they are estimated to have killed between 129 and one thousand Slovenes. As a result, in 1944, the anti-Partisan, Slovene intelligence officer, Colonel Vladimir Vauhnik, who helped organize spy networks for the British in Slovenia and Croatia, wrote that the Police and Slovene Home Guard "have mopped up everything that could be suspected of leftist sympathies".

In 1944, the Home Guard Police Corps rounded up the few remaining Jews in Ljubljana, and sent them to Auschwitz.

=== Antisemitism ===
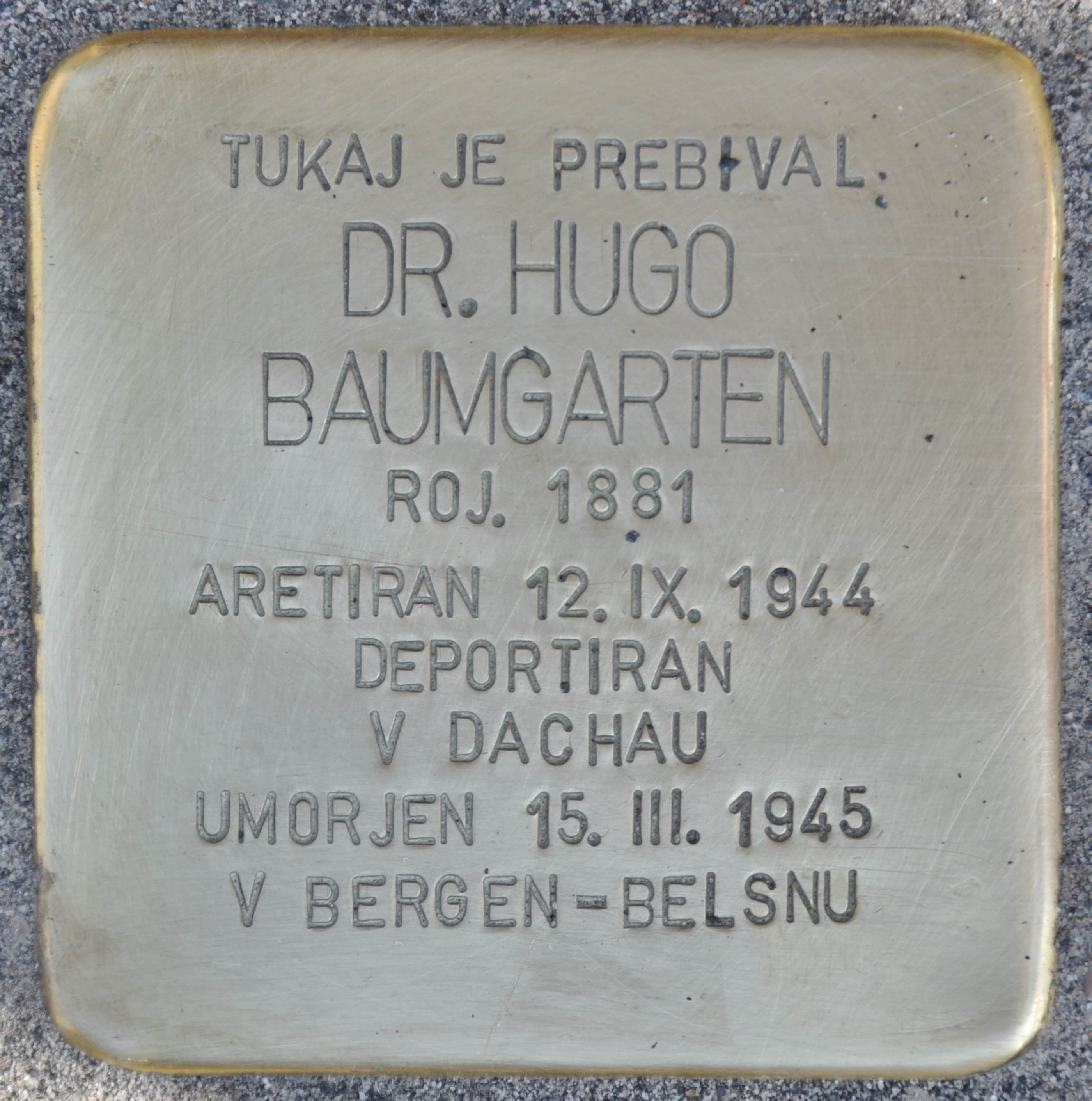
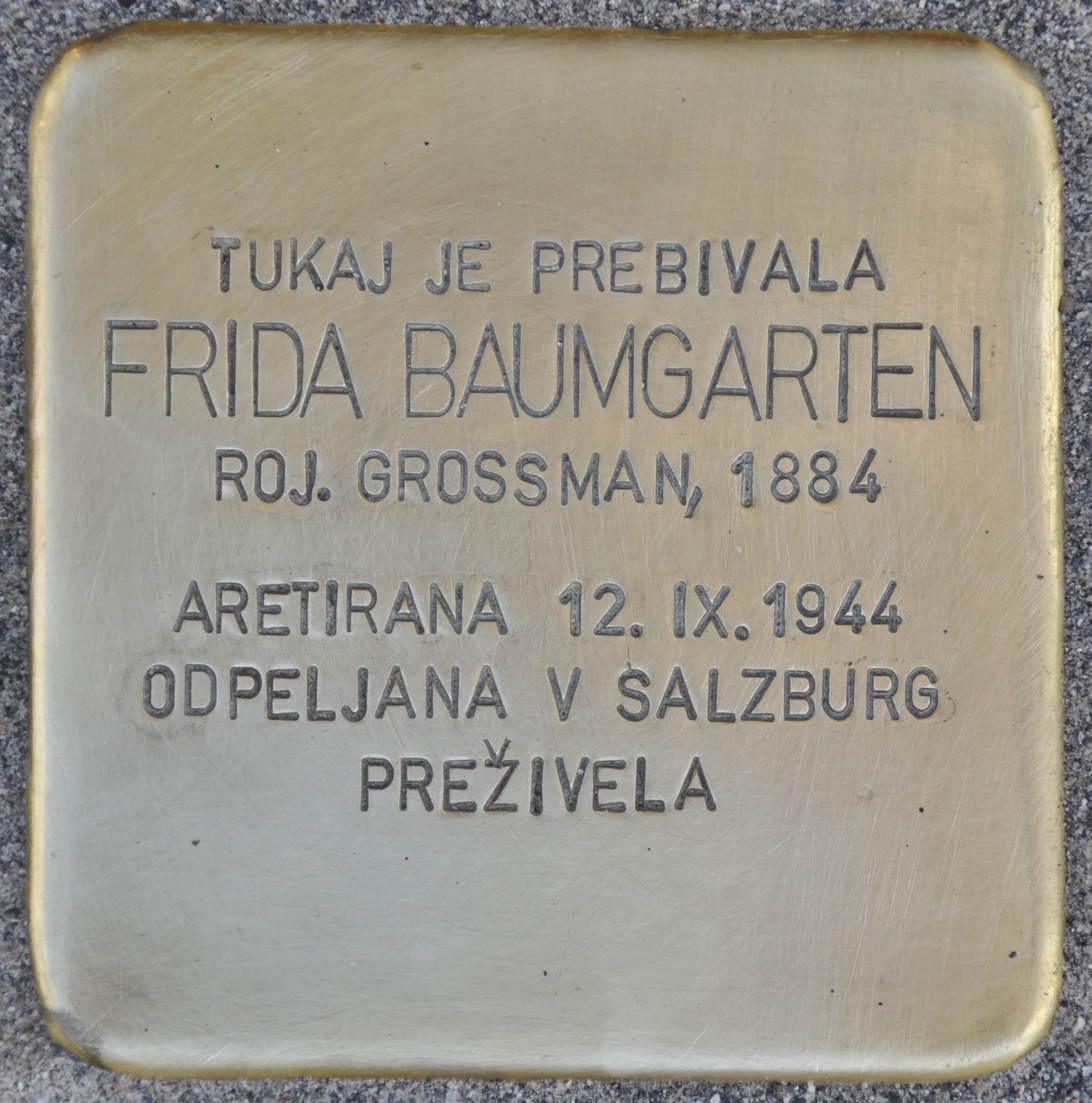
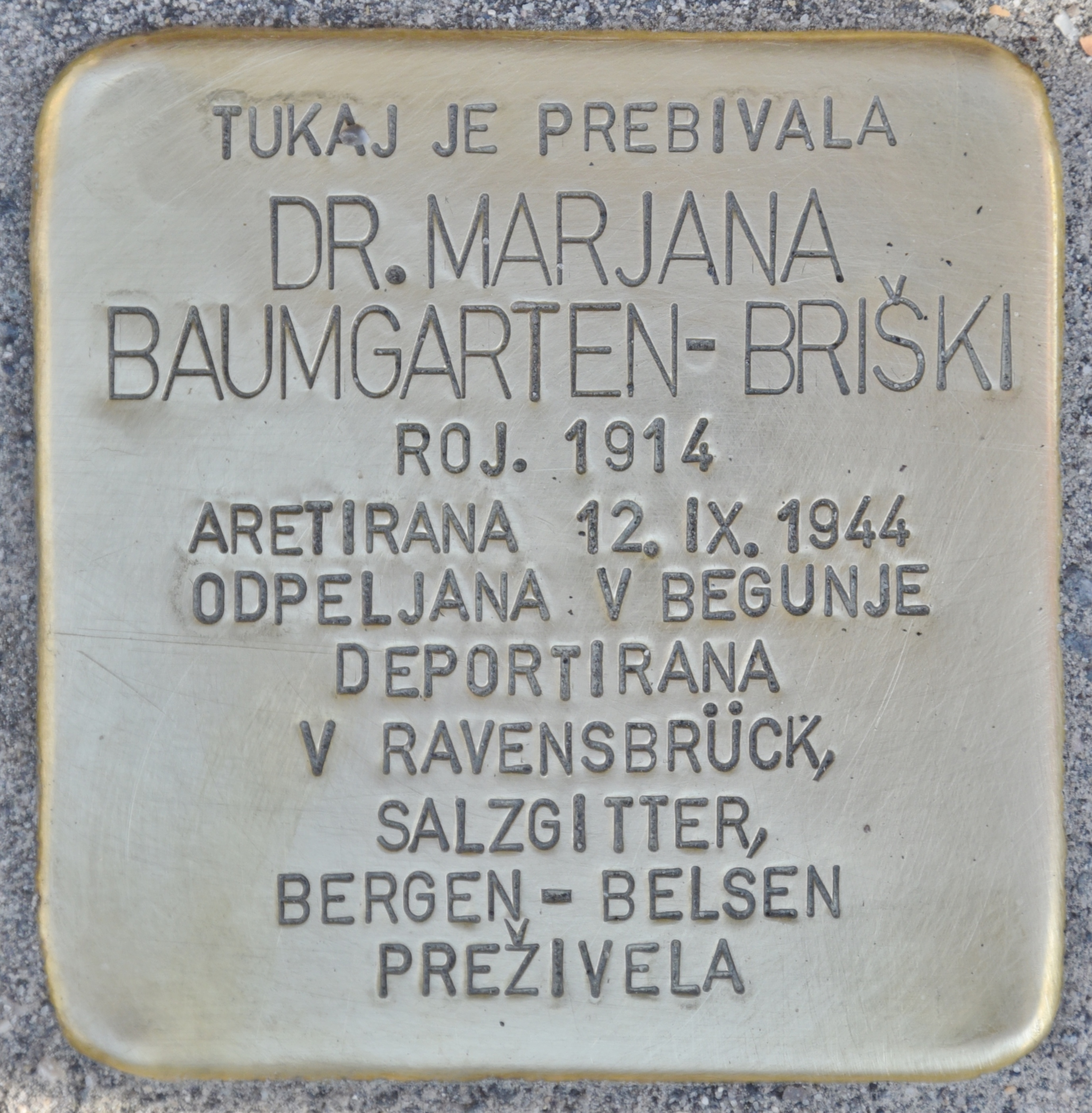
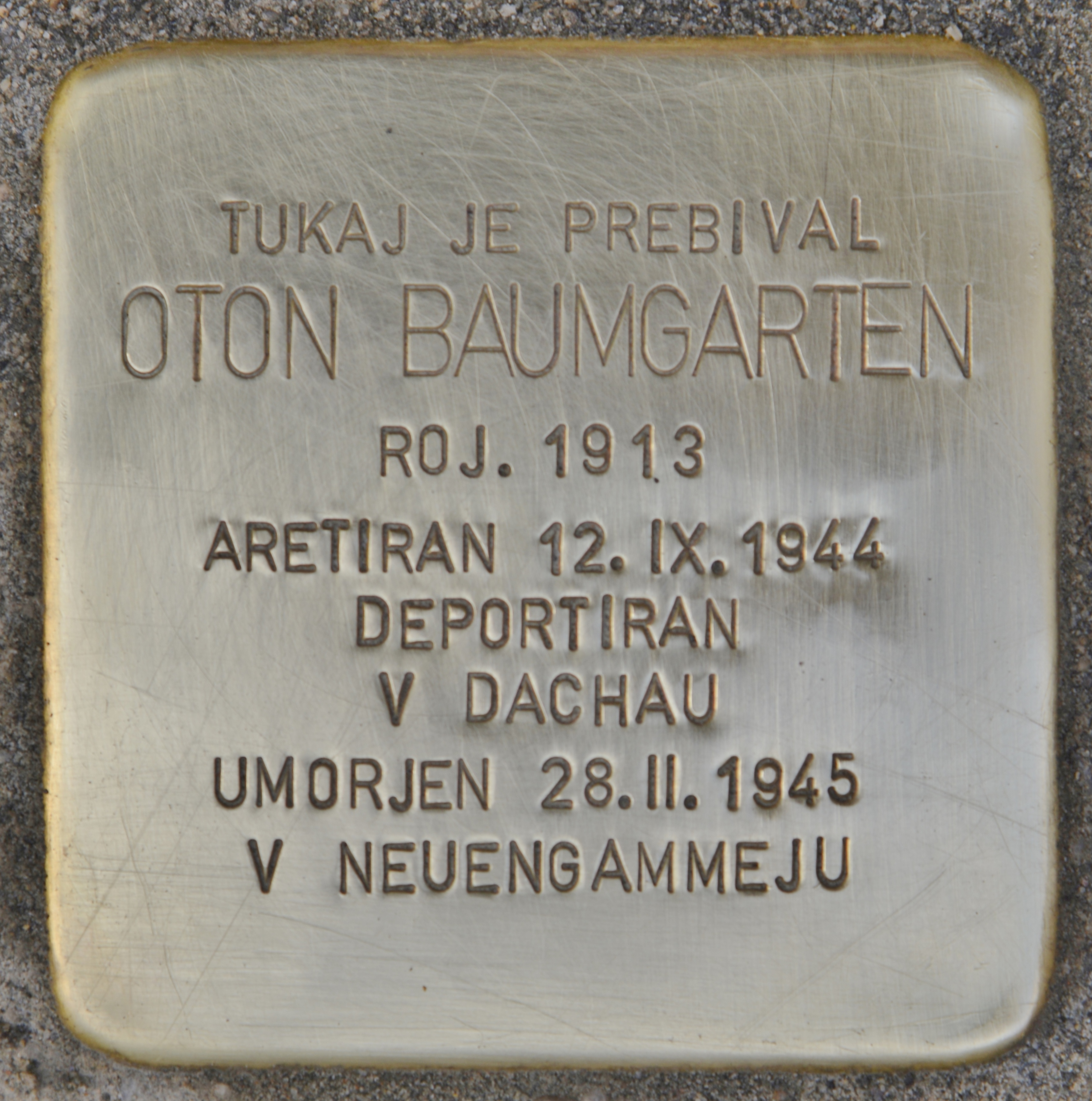
Memorial stones for a Jewish family, arrested in Ljubljana by SD Police Corps in September 1944 and sent to Nazi concentration camps

Part of the Partisan's very successful propaganda message was promulgating the assertion that antisemitism was central to Slovene Home Guard ideology. Before the war, the clericalist forces which later formed the core of the Home Guard, spread antisemitic propaganda in Slovenec and other Catholic papers. While Interior Minister in the Yugoslav government, the leading Slovene politician and former Catholic priest, Anton Korošec, declared "all Jews, Communists, and Freemasons as traitors, conspirators, and enemies of the State". In 1940, Korošec introduced two antisemitic laws in Yugoslavia, to ban Jews from the food industry and restrict the number of Jewish students in high schools and universities.

Such antisemitism greatly intensified during the War. When the Nazis appointed Rupnik as Inspector General of the Home Guard, he proclaimed in his speech: "that the Partisans were drugged and bought by Jews, with the task of destroying the Slovene nation, and that on the side of the Slovenian nation was a German soldier fighting against world Jewry". Home Guard propagandists regularly railed against "the Jewish-Bolshevik conspiracy", and in 1944 the main Slovene Home Guard newspaper wrote:

"Judaism wants to enslave the whole world. It can enslave it if it also economically destroys all the nations. That is why it drove nations into war to destroy themselves and thereby benefit the Jews. Communism is the most loyal executor of Jewish orders, along with liberal democracy. Both ideas were created by Jews for non-Jewish peoples. The Slovenian nation also wants to bring Judaism to its knees, along with its moral decay and impoverishment".

== German collaboration ==
General Leon Rupnik, mayor of Ljubljana and a veteran of the Austro-Hungarian Army, impressed on Germany that it would be mutually beneficial to Slovenia and Germany if Slovenians could defend themselves against the atrocities committed by the communists. Domobranci swore oaths for allegiance and Slovenian nation at Bežigrad stadium, first on Hitler's birthday, 20 April 1944, and the second time on 30 January 1945, the 12th anniversary of the Nazi takeover of power in Germany. In the first ceremony, the Domobranci from Ljubljana, some other units from the Province of Ljubljana, and members of the police corps of the Slovenian Home Guard swore oaths of allegiance. Before the oath, the bishop Gregorij Rožman held a silent mass for the Domobranci, then, according to witnesses, chose to observe from the background despite being offered a place on the main stand, and left quickly afterwards.

During the oath ceremony, the president of the provincial government, Leon Rupnik, and SS general Erwin Rösener made speeches and there were also some guests present, including the honorary consul of the Independent State of Croatia, commissioned officers of the Slovenian Home Guard, the rector of the Slovenian Academy of Sciences and Arts and others. They flew the Nazi German flag and also, for the first time since 1941, the Slovenian flag (which was banned under the Italian annexation), and displayed the coat of arms of Carniola. First they played the Nazi anthem and the Slovenian anthem Naprej zastava slave. After the ceremony Rösener awarded Domobranci medals and wound badges.

The oath was at the insistence of the Germans, upon a threat of the dissolution of the Slovenian Home Guard. By means of the oath, Rösener wanted greater discipline among the Domobranci and also put in place a judicial-formal basis, to which he could formally refer when dealing with the Slovenian Home Guard. The oath caused deep misgivings among the domobranci, as many wished to avoid any specific commitment except to the Slovenian Homeland. On the day of the oath, ten domobranci soldiers refused to parade and were arrested.

Despite the date on which the oath was taken and the accompanying scenography, the oath was not one of allegiance to Hitler (unlike the oath of allegiance of the SS), but it provided very useful propaganda for their opponents nonetheless. Many officers, who had already sworn an oath of allegiance to King Peter of Yugoslavia while in the Yugoslavian Army, tried more or less successfully to avoid it. However, now Domobranci were able to protect villages and towns as Partisans were on the run and conceding defeat. Thus, the Domobranci were able to keep the Communists at bay for almost two years and recover territory from Partisans. The Littoral and Upper Carniolan units never swore oaths.

Members of the Domobranci and the police force promised that:

"I swear by almighty God that I will be loyal, brave and obedient to my superiors, that I will stand in common struggle with the German armed forces, which stand under the command of the leader of Greater Germany, SS troops and police against bandits and communism and their allies; this duty I will carry out conscientiously for my Slovenian homeland as part of a free Europe. For this struggle I am also ready to sacrifice my life. So help me God!"

Most Domobranec in Ljubljana also signed a written statement in German and Slovene that:

"I have entered into the Slovensko Domobranstvo voluntarily, into the battle and the destruction of communism that has already brought sorrow to my country and endangered all of Europe. My fixed resolve with all its might is to fight under German leadership to the satisfaction of my country and Europe and to this I devote my life. I have confirmed this commitment by holy oath today. I have been informed as to my duties and rights regarding service, discipline and payment."

The Littoral Domobranci never swore any oaths to the Germans.

== Aftermath of World War II ==
Almost all SD members fled Slovenia and took refuge in the southern Austrian province of Carinthia at the end of the war (May 1945). Most were returned to Yugoslavia by the British military administration, and many were executed by the new communist authorities. The total number of Domobranci summarily executed in mass executions by the authorities exceeds 11,400. Those who were not directly shot were often sent on repeated death marches from one prison camp to the next.

The Slovenian Government created the Commission on Concealed Mass Graves in Slovenia and documented the mass grave sites of the POWs. They were investigated between November 2005 and October 2009. The refugees who were not executed were placed in Yugoslav concentration camps.

The summary executions were the first time publicly condemned in an interview that the writer Boris Pahor had with the poet and politician Edvard Kocbek, resulting in a campaign by the Titoist government against both in the "1975 Zaliv Scandal".

== See also ==
- Yugoslavia during World War II
- Collaboration during World War II
- Franc Frakelj
- Liberation Front of the Slovene Nation
- Kingdom of Yugoslavia
- Chetniks
