= Erwin Rösener =

German Nazi, Higher SS and Police Leader, SS-Obergruppenführer (1902–1946)

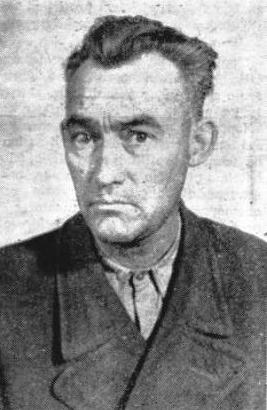
Erwin Rösener

Erwin Friedrich Karl Rösener (2 February 1902 – 4 September 1946) was a German Schutzstaffel (SS) commander during the Nazi era. During World War II, he was responsible for mass executions of civilians in Slovenia. Rösener was put on trial for war crimes and sentenced to death on 30 August 1946, then executed by hanging on 4 September 1946. He was posthumously included in the indictment at the Nuremberg Trials for war crimes.

== Early life and SS career ==
Rösener was born on 2 February 1902 in Schwerte, a town in the Westphalia. He joined the Nazi Party and the Sturmabteilung ("Brownshirts") paramilitary group on 6 November 1926, serving as an SA-Sturmführer until 1929. He applied to join the SS in October 1929 (his application was accepted in 1930). He was promoted 11 times between 1930 and 1944, eventually finishing with the rank of SS-Obergruppenführer and General of the Waffen-SS and Police. He was a member of the Freundeskreis der Wirtschaft, or "Circle of Friends of the Economy", a group of German industrialists whose aim was to raise funds for racial research within Nazi Germany. He was a close associate of SS chief Heinrich Himmler, and reported directly to him during the war.

Rosener also served as a deputy in the Reichstag from 1933 until the fall of the Nazi regime in May 1945. In November 1933, he was elected from electoral constituency 22 (Düsseldorf-East) and, from 1936 on, he was elected as a representative of electoral constituency 1 (East Prussia).

== War crimes in Yugoslavia ==
From the end of 1941 to the end of the war Himmler assigned Rösener as the Higher SS and Police Leader for SS-Oberabschnitt Alpenland, part of whose territory was Slovenia. Between October 1944 and the end of the war he was head of anti-partisan warfare in Ljubljana. During both assignments he ordered the execution of civilians, hostages and prisoners of war, actions which led to his name being on the indictment for war crimes at Nuremberg.

Rösener worked closely with Leon Rupnik in fighting the partisans, and ordered the formation of the pro-Nazi Domobranci, the Slovenian Home Guard forces on 24 September 1943.

Rösener escaped to Austria after the war but was arrested by the British and returned to Yugoslavia. He was put on trial alongside Leon Rupnik and others, and was sentenced to death on 30 August 1946. He was executed by hanging on 4 September 1946, aged 44, and was buried the same day in an unmarked grave at Ljubljana's Žale cemetery.

== Gallery ==
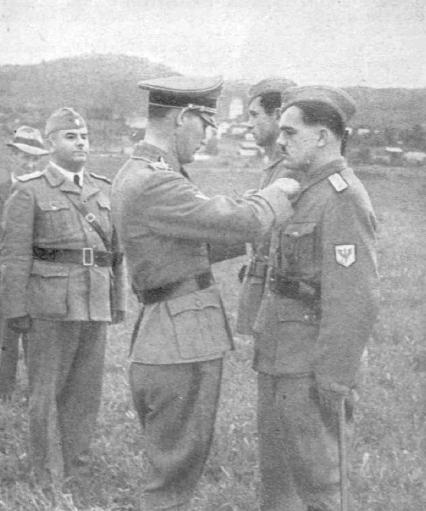
SS Lieutenant-General Erwin Rösener giving medals to Slovene Home Guard soldiers, c. 1944

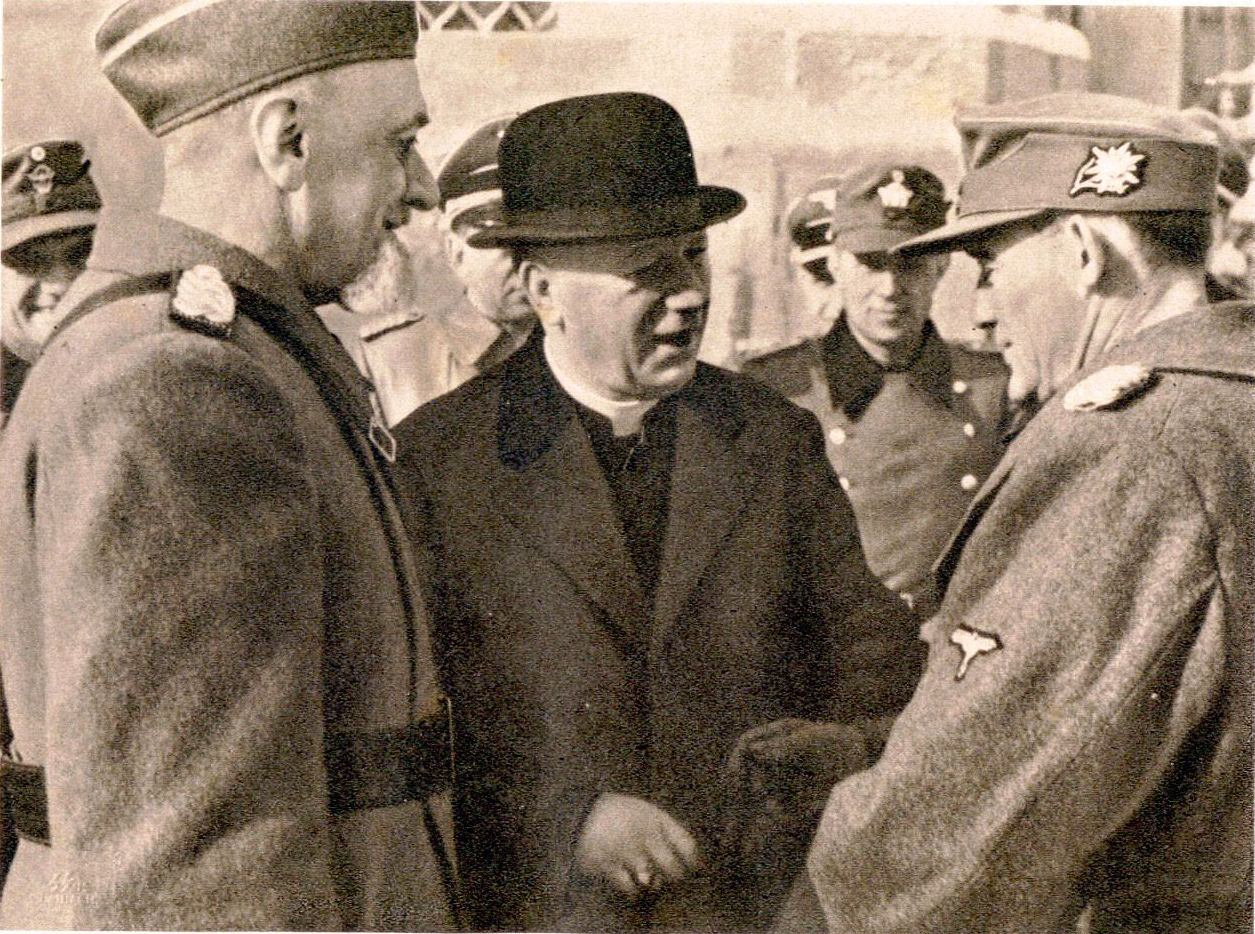
SD Inspector-General Leon Rupnik, Bishop Gregorij Rožman, and SS-General Erwin Rösener

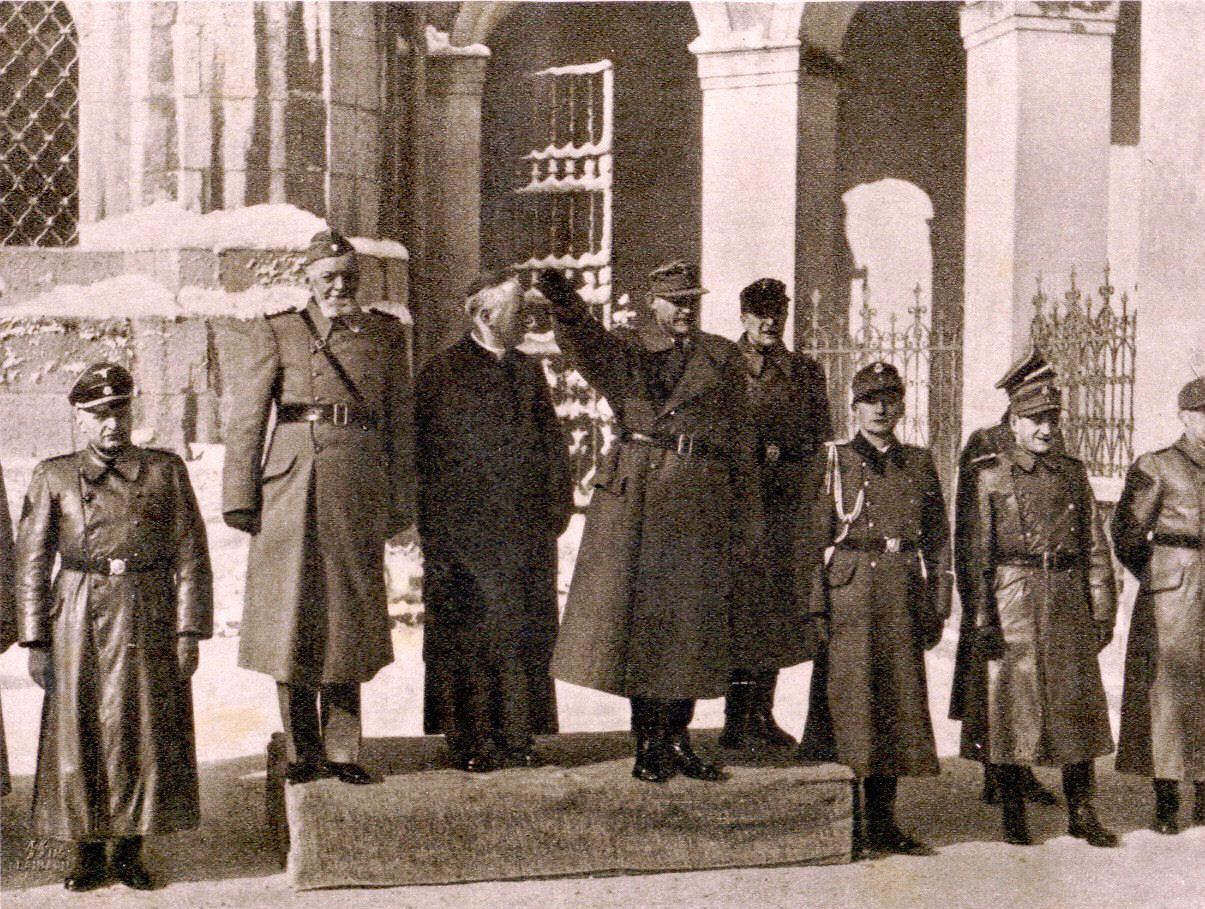
SD Inspector-General Leon Rupnik, Bishop Gregorij Rožman and SS-General Erwin Rösener inspect Slovene Home Guard troops, after the second oath of allegiance, 30 January 1945.
