= Juro Adlešič =

Slovenian lawyer and politician (1884–1968)

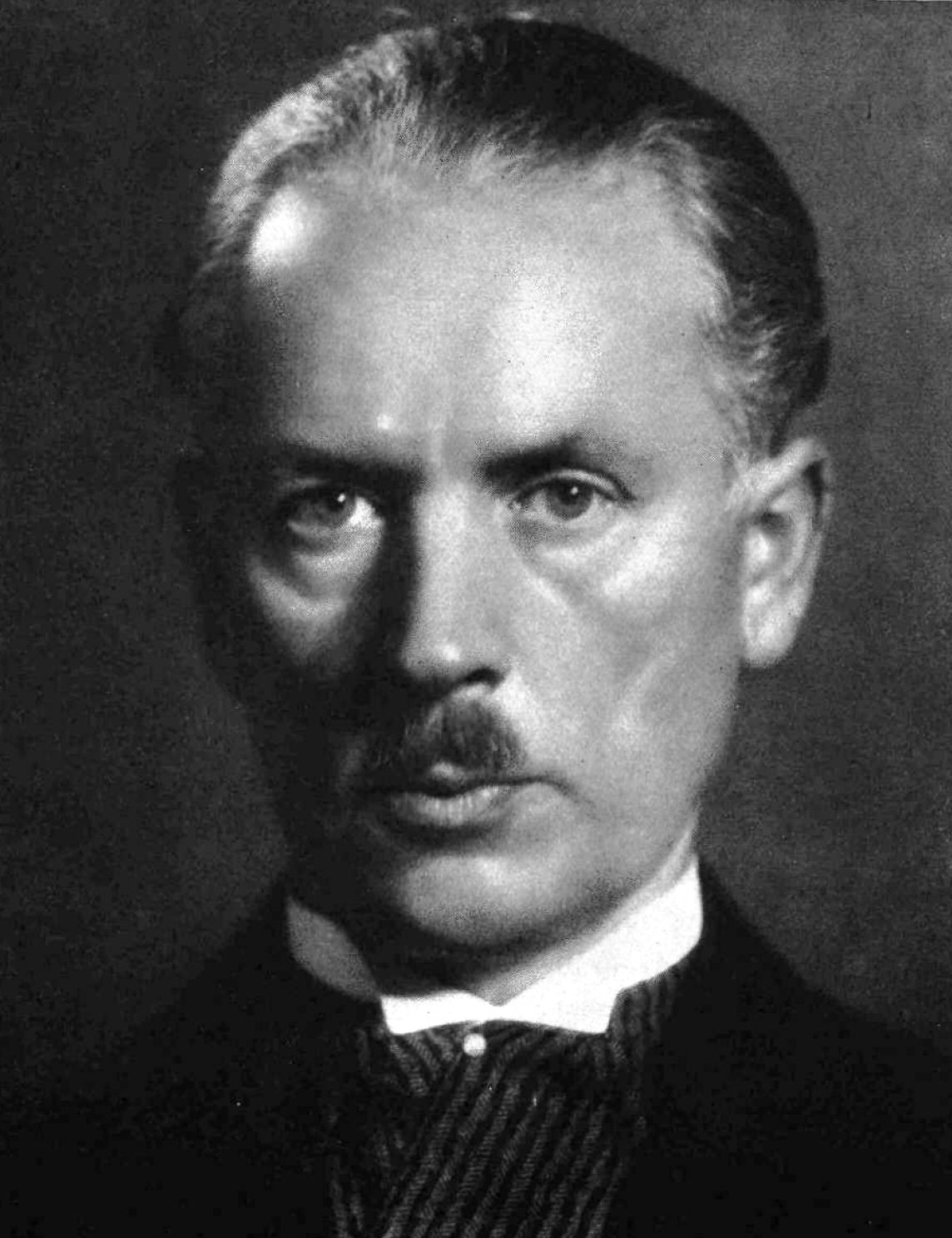

Mayor of Ljubljana
- In office 1935–1942
- Preceded by: Vladimir Ravnihar
- Succeeded by: Leon Rupnik

Personal details
- Born: 7 May 1884 Adlešiči, Austria-Hungary
- Died: 29 September 1968 (aged 84) Ljubljana, Yugoslavia
- Party: Slovene People's Party

Juro Adlešič (7 May 1884 – 29 September 1968) was a Slovenian lawyer and politician.

He was born in the village of Adlešiči in the Slovene region of White Carniola, then part of the Austro-Hungarian Empire. In 1918 he opened a legal office in Ljubljana. He joined the conservative Slovene People's Party, and served in the editorial board of the newspaper Slovenec.

In 1935 he became the mayor of Ljubljana. He stayed in office after the Italian annexation of south-central Slovenia during World War II, but resigned in June 1942. He was replaced by Leon Rupnik.

After World War II, Adlešič decided to stay in the Socialist Republic of Slovenia, unlike many prominent members of the Slovene People's Party, who escaped in fear of Communist persecution. He was not subjected to any persecution by the new authorities. He died in Ljubljana in 1968.

Preceded by Vladimir Ravnihar	Mayor of Ljubljana; 1935–1942	Succeeded by Leon Rupnik
