= Ernest Peterlin =

Yugoslav general (1903–1946)

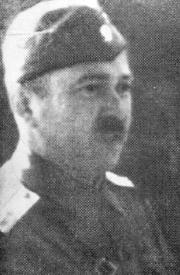
- Born: January 11, 1903; Ljubljana, Austria-Hungary
- Died: March 20, 1946 (aged 43); Ljubljana, FPR Yugoslavia
- Military career
- Allegiance: Yugoslavia (1938–1941); Italy (1942–1943); Slovene Home Guard (1943–1944)
- Service years: 1938–1944
- Rank: Lieutenant-Colonel
- Conflicts: World War II in Yugoslavia

Ernest Peterlin (11 January 1903 – 20 March 1946) was a Slovene military officer who rose to a senior position in the Royal Yugoslav Army prior to the Second World War. Married to Anja Roman Rezelj. A decided anti-Communist, during the war he became a prominent anti-Partisan military leader and one of the main exponents of the pro-Western faction of the Slovene Home Guard, an anti-Communist collaborationist militia active in parts of German-occupied Slovenia between 1943 and 1945. In 1945, he was tried and sentenced to death by the new Yugoslav Communist authorities and executed in 1946.

== Early life and pre-war career ==
Born in Ljubljana on 11 January 1903, Peterlin became a career soldier in the Royal Yugoslav Army. At the time of the Axis invasion of Yugoslavia in April 1941, he was chief of staff of the Yugoslav 3rd Army Group's 15th 'Zetska' Infantry Division, commanded by Brigadier General Milenko Varjačić. Following the swift Axis victory and occupation of Yugoslavia, Peterlin was involved in and worked to promote pro-royalist militia. However, in March 1942 most royal army officers who were in the Italian-annexed parts of Slovenia, including Peterlin, were arrested and sent to Italian prisoner-of-war camps "as a precautionary measure".

== Second World War leadership ==
The foremost resistance to the occupation was Josip Broz Tito's Partisan movement. In Slovenia, this resistance was led by the Liberation Front of the Slovenian People, in which the Communist influence soon prevailed. The pro-royalist militia took on a fundamentally anti-Communist stand. The Italian occupation forces under General Mario Roatta "were eager to use the anti-Communist forces as auxiliary troops" against the partisans. This was in line with the desires of the anti-Communist forces themselves, "which were to strengthen their armed groups and obtain Italian recognition and assistance in order to carry on their fight against the Partisans – who for them, as for the Chetniks, were a much more dangerous enemy than the occupying powers". In August 1942, Roatta visited Bishop Gregorij Rožman "and urged the Slovene Catholic forces to participate actively in the struggle against the Communists". Rožman responded favourably, sending Roatta a memorandum in September 1942 containing detailed advice on how to fight the Partisans, which included the suggestion that named anti-Communist internees should be released to lead the Anti-Communist Volunteer Militia (Milizia volontaria anticomunista – MVAC). Peterlin was among those released from internment and "became the chief of the Slovene units in Italian service", but, according to Jozo Tomašević:

One released officer, former General Staff Lieutenant Colonel Ernest Peterlin, was appointed by the Italians to command the MVAC unit in Ljubljana. This unit, organized at the end of October 1942, had about 150 men and served as an auxiliary police force in the city. It acted so harshly against actual and suspected followers of the Liberation Front, especially during raids and searches in December 1942, that considerable public protest arose. As a result, it was disbanded in mid-January 1943. Those it had apprehended were either released, turned over to military courts, or sent to concentration camps.

In spring 1943, the Slovene Legion (Slovenska legija) appointed Peterlin the secret commander of all its men in the MVAC in the Province of Ljubljana. After the September 1943 capitulation of Italy, the Province of Ljubljana was occupied by the Germans in its entirety. SS General Erwin Rösener, the commander of German forces in the province, sought to continue the use of the anti-Communist forces, and to this end ordered the formation of the Domobranci, the Slovenian Home Guard forces on 24 September 1943. Although they were "fully armed, supplied, and paid by the German occupation authorities", the Domobranci "were not united in their aims. A faction around General Rupnik sincerely believed in the Germans and what they stood for. Another group around Lieutenant-Colonel Ernest Peterlin wanted eventually to link up with the Western Allies".

From its inception until the end of 1944, Peterlin was chief of staff of organizational headquarters of the Slovenian Home Guard and from February 1944 was also commander of its training group. Meanwhile, the group of officers around Peterlin "was making clandestine plans in case of an invasion by the Western Allies, and was in touch with them by radio". German commanders were aware of the pro-Western attitude of this faction of the Domobranci, and anxious that in the event of an Allied landing in Istria they might change sides, in December 1944, Peterlin and other pro-Western Domobranci officers were arrested by the Gestapo and sent to Dachau concentration camp, possibly after betrayal by a Partisan infiltrator.

Peterlin was in Dachau until the end of the war, whereupon he was forcibly repatriated to Yugoslavia. He was put on show trial for collaboration with the enemy, convicted and sentenced to death in the so-called Christmas trials (Slovene: božični proces) at the District Court in Ljubljana. He was executed by hanging on 20 March 1946.
