= Vuk Rupnik =

Slovene military officer (1912–1975)

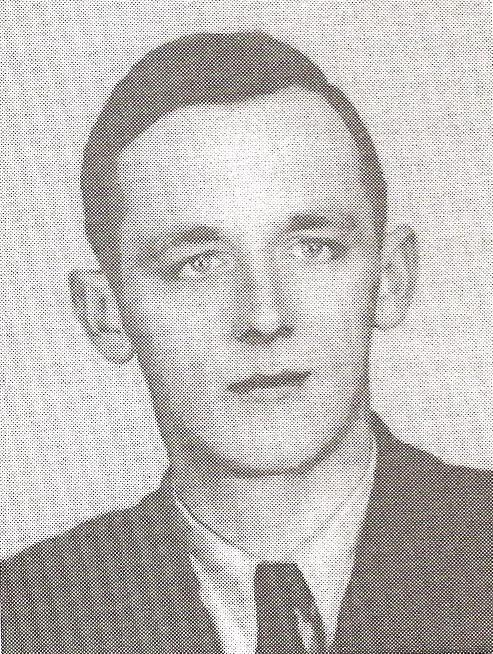
- Born: July 27, 1912; Mostar, Bosnia and Herzegovina, Austria-Hungary
- Died: August 14, 1975 (aged 63); Castelar, Argentina
- Military career
- Allegiance: Kingdom of Yugoslavia
- Service years: 1935–1945
- Rank: Major
- Commands: Commander of several Slovene Home Guard battalions
- Conflicts: Various battles with the Partisans in Inner Carniola

Vuk Rupnik (July 27, 1912 – August 14, 1975) was a Slovene military officer during the Second World War.

Rupnik was born in Mostar, Bosnia and Herzegovina, the son of the career soldier Leon Rupnik. He studied at the military academy in Belgrade and served as an officer in mountain units. In 1940 he became the commander of the company stationed in Gerovo (in Croatia's Gorski Kotar region) and was promoted to the rank of captain. After the capitulation of Yugoslavia, he was a prisoner of war in Padua for some time, but in 1942 he joined the Anti-Communist Volunteer Militia and became the commander of a special unit in the division in Novo Mesto. After the capitulation of fascist Italy, he united the MVAC units in the Novo Mesto area and turned them over to the German army after the withdrawal of the Italians near Kostanjevica na Krki. In November 1943, the units headed by Rupnik (known as the Rupnikova skupina 'Rupnik Group') became the 3rd Battalion of the Slovene Home Guard. Under Rupnik's command, the battalion took part in the German offensive in Lower Carniola in 1943. On December 14, 1943, Rupnik became the commander of the 3rd Battle Group and was transferred to Ljubljana at the end of the year, where he served as a liaison officer between the Home Guard Headquarters and the German staff. On July 5, 1944, he became the commander of the 2nd Strike Battalion at Rakek, which was successful in battles against Partisan units in Inner Carniola and Lower Carniola. In early 1945, he was promoted to major. At the end of the war, he withdrew to Carinthia with a battalion, and on May 11, 1945 he took part in the destruction of the Partisan prison near Ferlach. He remained in Austria for some time and made a living working on farms in Tyrol. He then moved to Argentina, where he worked as a clerk in a textile factory in Ciudadela, Buenos Aires. He died in Castelar, Argentina.
