= Gastone Gambara =

Italian general

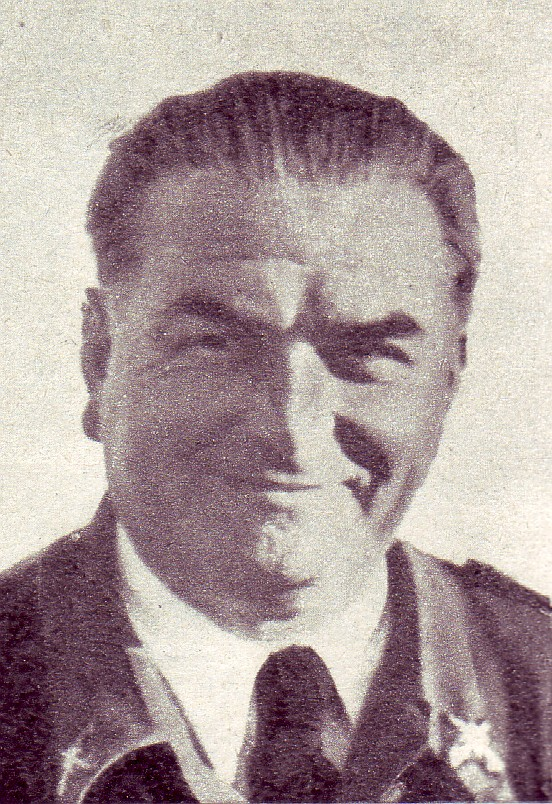
- Born: 10 November 1890; Imola, Kingdom of Italy
- Died: 27 February 1962 (aged 71); Rome, Italy
- Military career
- Allegiance: Kingdom of Italy; Italian Social Republic; Italian Republic
- Branch: Royal Italian Army; National Republican Army; Italian Army
- Rank: Lieutenant general
- Commands: Corpo Truppe Volontarie; XV Army Corps; VIII Army Corps; XX Army Corps; XIX Army Corps; XI Army Corps
- Conflicts: World War I: Battle of Asiago; Second Italo-Ethiopian War Spanish Civil War: Catalonia Offensive; Final Offensive; World War II: Italian invasion of France; Greco-Italian War; Western Desert campaign; World War II in Yugoslavia; Italian Civil War

Gastone Gambara (10 November 1890 – 27 February 1962) was an Italian General who participated in World War I and World War II. He excelled during the Italian intervention in favor of the nationalists in the Spanish Civil War. During World War II, he had an outstanding role in the North African campaign and the repression of partisans in Yugoslavia.

== Biography ==
=== First World War ===
Born in Imola, Gambara began his military career as a non-commissioned officer before graduating from the Military Academy of Modena. During World War I he served in the Alpini. In June 1916 he was wounded on Monte Cengio on the Asiago plateau. In late September 1916, he was transferred to the Macedonian front and served with the 62nd Infantry Regiment "Sicilia". In March 1917, he was repatriated to Italy and served with the 6th Alpini Regiment on the Alpine front. In 1918 he was promoted Major for "war merits" and appointed commander of the 29th Regiment Arditi. In the last months of the war, he was awarded three Silver Medals for Military Valor.

=== Between the wars ===
After commanding the Alpini Battalion "Edolo" in the early 1920s he held a variety of staff posts. He was the chief of staff to Bastico during the Second Italo-Ethiopian War. For his contributions during the war, Gambara was awarded the knight's cross of the Military Order of Savoy. He was promoted to the rank of colonel in February 1937. In November 1938 he was appointed commander of the Corpo Truppe Volontarie, the Italian Corps that fought in the Spanish Civil War. He was commander-in-chief of the Cuerpo de Ejercito Legionario during the Catalonia Offensive, and the final offensive of the Spanish Civil War. On 30 March his troops occupied Alicante. Gambara was Italian ambassador to Spain from 1938 to 1940.

=== Second World War ===
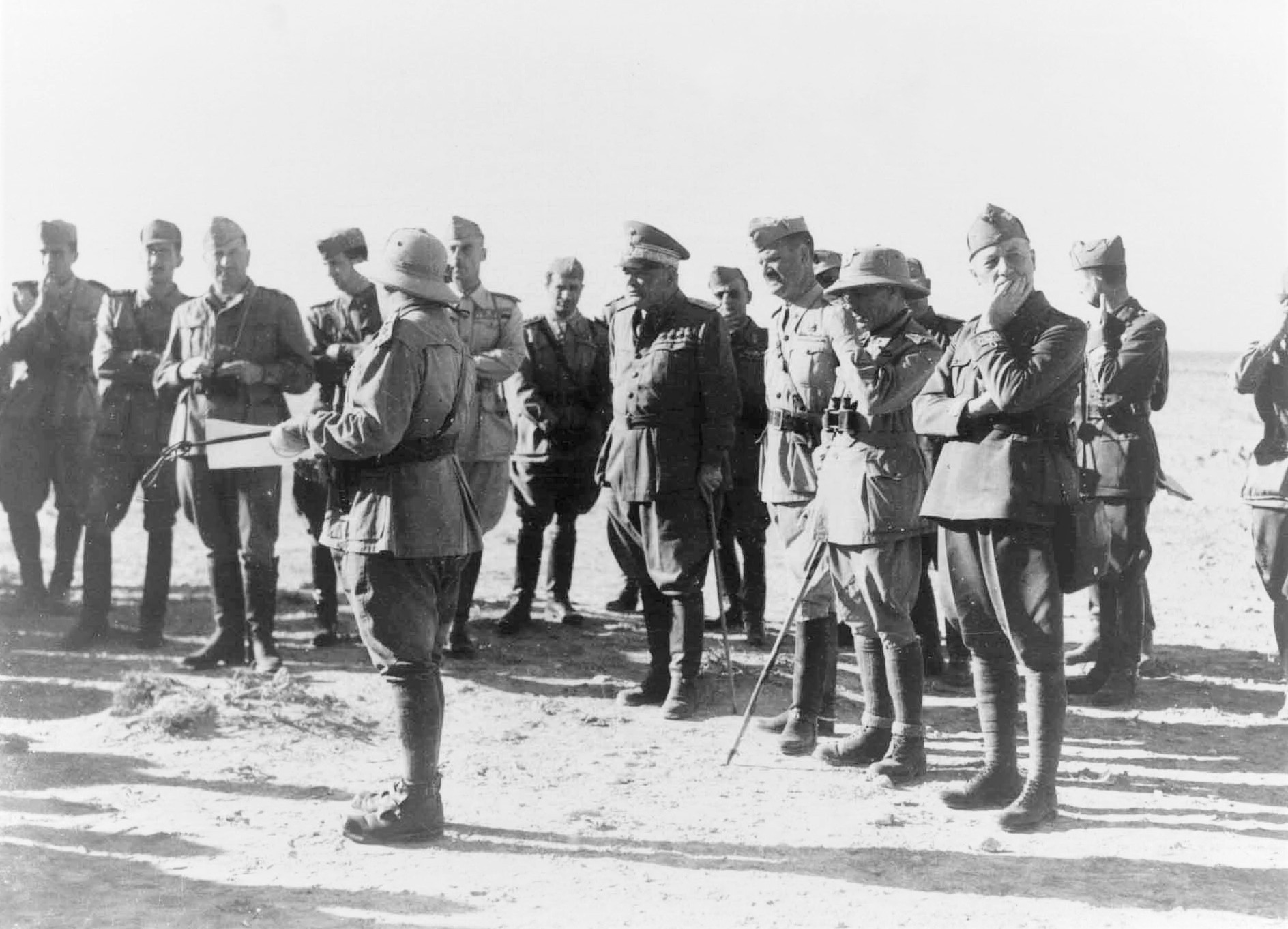
Gambara with General Alessandro Piazzoni and other Italian officers in North Africa in the autumn of 1941

During the Second World War, he fought in France, Yugoslavia, and Libya. He commanded the XV Army Corps during the battle of France (1940) and the VIII Army Corps during the Greco-Italian War (1941). During the Western Desert Campaign Gambara was appointed Chief of Staff of the High Command in North Africa and commanded the Italian XX Army Corps, formed by the 101st Motorized Division "Trieste", along with the 132nd Armored Division "Ariete", which had 137 M13/40 tanks. The Italian XX Corps did not come under Rommel's control until late November 1941. On 24 November 1941, during the Totensonntag Battle, Rommel sent a telegram to Rome asking German military attaché in Italy, General Enno von Rintelen, to persuade Mussolini to place Gambara under his command. Mussolini answered Rommel's requests by anointing him as commander of the Axis troops in Marmarica and placing Italian XX Army Corps at his disposal. Italian units under Gambara's command fought well and bravely. By November 23, the Ariete with assistance from the Trieste and Savona Divisions, had gained the advantage.

On March 3, 1942, Gambara was replaced as Chief of Staff of the High Command in North Africa by lieutenant general Curio Barbasetti di Prun. From December 1942 Gambara commanded the XI Army Corps, which was involved in anti-partisan operations and brutal repression of the population in Slovenia. Fifteen hundred innocent people died In the Rab concentration camp from hunger, privation, and lack of medical care. In the Gonars camp, which included a large number of former Yugoslav soldiers, 420 succumbed to malnutrition and brutal treatment.

Gambara was perfectly aware of the situation, but nevertheless thought it could be an advantage. When the High Commissioner for the Province of Ljubljana Emilio Grazioli turned to him to complain about the harsh treatment meted out to those who had been interned ('absolutely all of them reveal the most severe evidence of lack of activity and starvation'), Gambara harshly answered him: “A concentration camp does not mean a fattening camp; a sick individual is a quiet individual.”

After the Kingdom of Italy joined the Allies, he was appointed Chief of Staff of the National Republican Army thanks to Rodolfo Graziani’s nomination. On May 14, 1944, Gambara fell ill and Archimede Mischi was chosen to replace him.

=== Later life ===
In 1945, Gamabra was interned in the Allied POW camp at Coltano. In June 1945 he was dishonorably discharged from the army. In 1947, Gambara emigrated to Spain at Franco's invitation. He returned to Italy and was reinstated in the Italian Army in 1952. He died in Rome in 1962.

After the war, the Socialist Federal Republic of Yugoslavia unsuccessfully requested Gambara's extradition, and he along with other suspected Italian war criminals were never tried. The British government frustrated such requests due to their attempt to bolster the anti-communist position of the post-war Italian government. His name appears in the CROWCASS wanted list compiled by the Allies in 1947.

== Awards ==
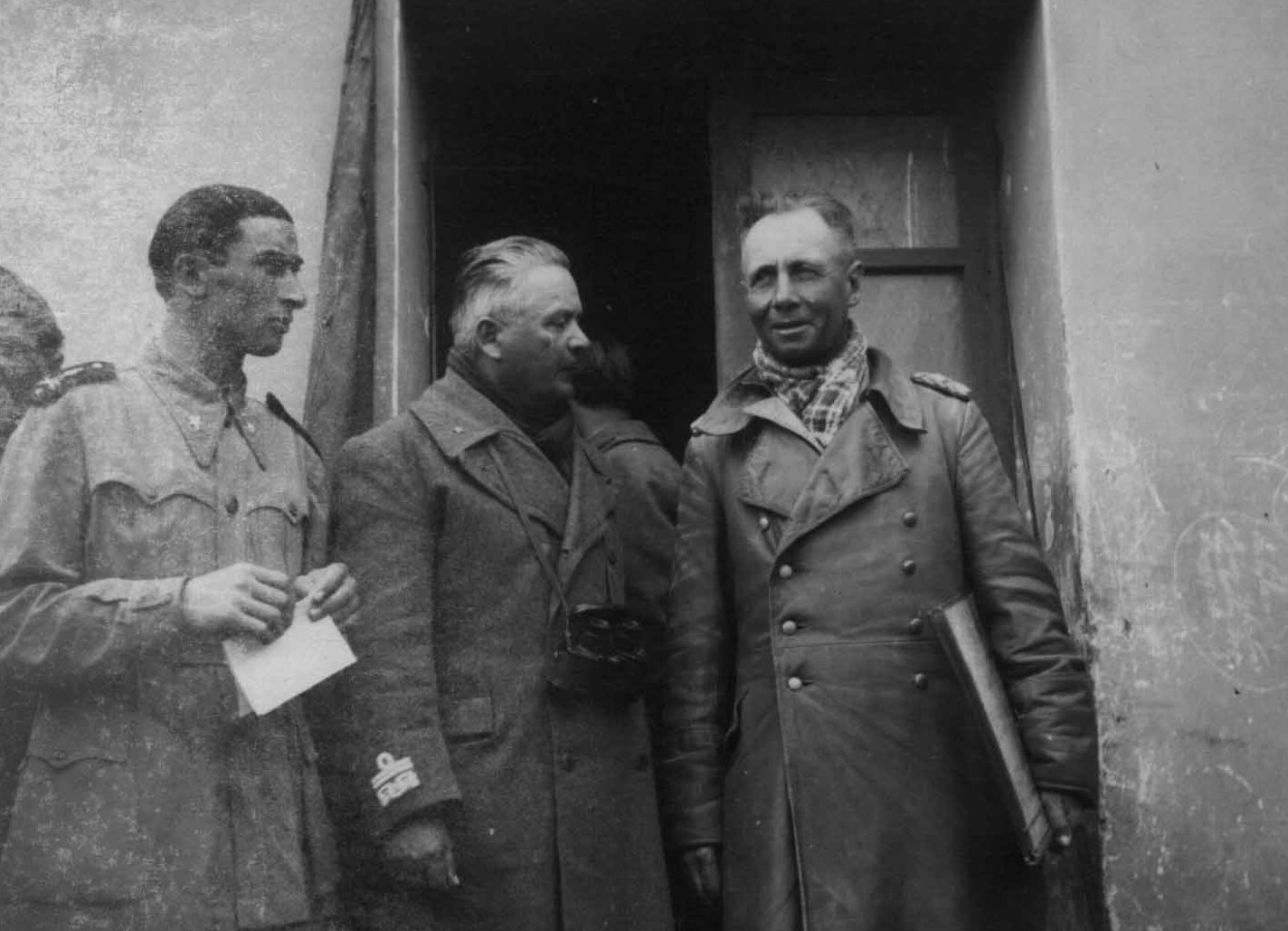
Generals Gastone Gambara and Rommel in the Autumn of 1941

- Knight Grand Cross of the Order of the Crown of Italy
- Silver Medal of Military Valor
- War Merit Cross
- Commemorative Medal for the Italo-Austrian War 1915–1918
- Commemorative Medal of the Unity of Italy
- Allied Victory Medal
- Commemorative Medal for the Operations in the Italian East Africa, 1936–40
- Knight Grand Cross of the Sovereign Military Order of Malta in August 1939
- Iron Cross First and Second Class

== Sources ==
- Murphy, W. E. (1961). Fairbrother, Monty C. (ed.). The Relief of Tobruk. The Official History of New Zealand in the Second World War 1939–1945 (online scan ed.). Wellington, NZ: War History Branch, Department of Internal Affairs. Archived from the original on 12 July 2015 – via New Zealand Electronic Text Collection.
- Trizzino, Antonino (1963). Gli amici dei nemici. Milan: Longanesi.
- Carell, Paul (1999). Le volpi del deserto. Milan: Rizzoli. ISBN 88-17-25834-2.
- Thomas, Hugh (2001). The Spanish Civil War. London: Penguin Books.
- Cattaruzza, Marina (2007). L'Italia e il confine orientale, 1866-200. Bologna: Il Mulino. ISBN 978-88-15-11394-8.
- Aga-Rossi, Elena (2011). Una guerra a parte. Bologna: Il Mulino. ISBN 978-88-15-15070-7.
- Cocut, Carlo (2012). Alpini nella città di Fiume 1944-1945. Voghera: Marvia Edizioni. ISBN 978-88-89089-42-2.
- Gooch, John (2020). Mussolini's War: Fascist Italy from Triumph to Collapse, 1935–1943. London: Allen Lane. ISBN 978-0-241-18570-4.
