= Commissioner =

One of various roles or titles

A commissioner (commonly abbreviated as Comm'r) is, in principle, a member of a commission or an individual who has been given a commission (official charge or authority to do something).

In practice, the title of commissioner has evolved to include a variety of senior officials, often sitting on a specific commission. In particular, the commissioner frequently refers to senior police or government officials. A high commissioner is equivalent to an ambassador, originally between the United Kingdom and the Dominions and now between all Commonwealth states, whether Commonwealth realms, republics or countries having a monarch other than that of the realms. The title is sometimes given to senior officials in the private sector; for instance, many North American sports leagues.

There is some confusion between commissioners and commissaries because other European languages use the same word for both. Therefore titles such as commissaire in French, Kommissar in German (Note: Later borrowed into Russian as Commissar under the Soviet Union) and comisario in Spanish or commissario in Italian, can mean either commissioner or commissary in English, depending on the context.

== Domestic public official ==
A commissioner within a modern state generally holds his or her office by a commission from the head of state or a council of elected representatives (or appointed by non-elected officials in the case of dictatorships).

=== Canadian territories ===
Commissioners are the formal heads of the territories in Canada (those areas under the formal jurisdiction of the federal Crown-in-Council without separate constitutional status of a province). Unlike the governor general or a lieutenant governor, commissioners are not viceregal representatives of the Canadian monarch; rather, they are delegates of the federal Crown-in-Council and, under federal statutes governing the territories, act following written instructions from Cabinet or the minister responsible (currently the minister of northern affairs). While commissioners formerly had a direct day-to-day role in administration and government and chaired the territory's executive council, today they are under instruction to act more like provincial lieutenant governors, as territorial assemblies have taken on more responsibility. Commissioners thus perform ceremonial duties similar to those of the monarch and viceroys, including reading the speech from the throne at the opening of the territorial legislature and presenting commendations to Canadian Forces members for long-term or outstanding service to the office. Possible candidates for the position are selected by the Advisory Committee on Vice-Regal Appointments. The official appointment is made by the Governor General-in-Council (the federal government).

==== Current Canadian commissioners ====
Symbol of office	Territory	Current commissioner	Commissioner since
	Northwest Territories	Gerald Kisoun	May 14, 2024
	Nunavut	Eva Aariak	January 14, 2021
	Yukon	Adeline Webber	May 31, 2023

=== Imperial China ===
Senior public servants, commissioners and other high-ranking bureaucrats referred to collectively as mandarins.

=== Isle of Man ===
In the local government system of the Isle of Man, a commissioner is an elected representative equivalent to a councillor. All town, village, district and parish local government bodies consist of commissioners, except for Douglas, which has a council and councillors.

=== Malawi ===
Malawi's position of district commissioner refers to the person that is appointed by the president of Malawi to oversee the administration of any of its 28 districts. One commissioner is appointed per district. The position was created during the British colonial era, sustained during the Kamuzu Banda era and continues as a prominent position in democratic era in Malawi.

=== Scotland ===
Prior to the Acts of Union 1707, an elected member of the Estates (parliament) of Scotland held the office of commissioner, representing a constituency (the equivalent of a member of parliament in the contemporaneous Parliament of England). There were burgh commissioners and shire or stewartry commissioners.

=== United States ===
==== Current ====
In many U.S. states, the legislative and executive decision-making bodies of counties are called the board of commissioners or county commission.

In Minnesota, Alaska, New Hampshire, New York, Texas and Tennessee, the heads of some statewide departments are called "commissioners".

In California, court commissioners are subordinate judicial officers granted many of the same authorities as judges, though not all.

In some states certain municipalities may have a planning or zoning authority composed of local officials or members of the public. These authorities can be called commissions with the members addressed as "commissioners".

==== Historic ====
In the past, the U.S. government-appointed special commissioners for a variety of tasks. For example, the head of the U.S. Department of Agriculture from 1862 to 1889 was a commissioner, not a Cabinet secretary.

The Board of Navy Commissioners, a three-member United States Navy administrative body responsible for the navy's material support, existed from 1815 to 1842.

Until 1968, federal courts appointed commissioners to perform routine judicial duties such as taking testimony, taking bail, and even enforcing laws such as the Fugitive Slave Act. These commissioners were replaced by United States magistrate judges.

=== General ===
==== Police ====
In police services in the Commonwealth of Nations and the United States, the title of commissioner typically designates the head of an entire police force.

In other countries, such as Latin American countries, France, Germany, Austria, the Netherlands, Luxembourg, Spain, Italy, etc., a commissioner is typically the commander of a major police station or a locally/regionally important police service. The equivalent ranks in the police forces of the United States and the United Kingdom are respectively captain and superintendent.

==== Other emergency services ====
In firefighting services in the Commonwealth of Nations, the title of commissioner typically designates the head of an entire fire service in a particular jurisdiction, such as the commissioner of the New South Wales Rural Fire Service or the commissioner of Fire and Rescue NSW, two separate fire authorities that operate within the Australian state of New South Wales.

== International public and colonial context ==
=== British and Commonwealth overseas possessions ===
The title of commissioner or district commissioner, as such, was used by the (gubernatorial) chief British official in:

- British India, now composed of four independent countries (Pakistan, India, Burma and Bangladesh), where the divisional commissioner was the head of one of the few divisions of a province and was higher than a deputy commissioner and lower than a secretary (now principal secretary) in the provincial capital.
- British Central Africa
- Territories of Zambesia and Rhodesia, administered under charter by the British South Africa Company
- The Oil Rivers Protectorate (from 5 June 1885 under a consul-general; soon renamed Niger Coast Protectorate), from 3 August 1891 till 1 January 1900 when it became the Protectorate of Southern Nigeria, hence under a high commissioner
- The Caribbean Turks and Caicos Islands, 1874 – 4 July 1959, as a dependency under the governor of Jamaica colony
- The Weihaiwei concession territory (held from China) from 1902 to 1938
- Kamaran Island, in June 1915 taken from the Ottoman Empire and subordinated to the Aden Settlement, but not incorporated, till on 30 November 1967 it became part of the newly independent People's Republic of South Yemen.
- The UN trust territory of British Cameroons, only two incumbents, from 1 October 1954 (the only Special Resident succeeding himself till 1956) to 1 October 1961 when Southern British Cameroons was incorporated into the independent Republic of Cameroon (former French mandate of Cameroun), after the northern part united with Nigeria on 1 June 1961.

The title of commissioner was also used by the senior diplomatic representatives of Commonwealth countries in British colonies, such as:

- Hong Kong, before the handover to the People's Republic of China in 1997, after which they became known as consuls-general.
- Singapore, prior to independence in 1965, after which they became known as high commissioners.

=== Canada ===
Canada calls its government officials in charge of export promotion "trade commissioners". There are 150 offices of the Canadian Trade Commissioner Service in Canada and abroad, and they "assist with export advice and guidance to help [Canadians] achieve [their] international business goals". The website devoted to the Canadian Trade Commissioner Service uses the Internet domain www.tradecommissioner.gc.ca.

=== European Union ===
The European commissioners are the members of the European Commission, the cabinet of the European Union. Commissioners’ role closely resembles that of the ministers of the Union’s member states; each is assigned a portfolio under the authority of the president of the EU Commission, but they make important decisions collegially, often subject to approval by the European Parliament and/or the Council of the European Union, the two organs of the EU’s bicameral legislature.

=== French colonies ===
The French equivalent, commissaire, was used for various officials employed at different levels of the colonial administration in several French-ruled countries.

=== Russian Empire ===
After on 17 April 1914 Tannu Tuva (ethnically Mongolian) was declared a Russian 'protected' area (Uryanhay [Urjanhaj] kray), two subsequent Russian commissioners for the affairs of Urjanhai Kray (1914–1915 A.P. Cererin (Tsererin) and 1915–1917 Yu.V. Grigoryev) were appointed, alongside the last native tribal paramount chief (title Ambyn-noyon), followed by a single commissar of the provisional government (October 1917 – 16 March 1918 Aleksey Aleksandrovich Turchaninov) until czarist rule collapsed for good, giving way to the Soviet regime

=== United Nations administration ===
A UN commissioner appointed in 1949 supervised the transition of the UN Trust territory of Libya (a former Italian colony; actually Tripolitania and Cyrenaica each was under a British administrator, in 1949 restyled Resident, Fezzan under a French military governor, in 1950 also restyled résident) to independence as a united monarchy in 1951.

=== United States ===
From the mid-19th century until 1939, two U.S. government cabinet departments used the title "commissioner" for officials posted abroad who did not enjoy diplomatic status. U.S. federal agencies have not titled officials posted abroad as commissioners since 1939.

==== U.S. Department of Agriculture ====
During the 19th century, the U.S. Department of Agriculture (USDA) began sending employees, called "agricultural commissioners", abroad to investigate foreign agriculture. These appointments were of a roving nature, as the officials were not assigned to a particular country or city. In 1919 USDA posted to London an agricultural commissioner without diplomatic status, Edward Foley, to report on British agriculture. Additional commissioners were posted through the 1920s to Buenos Aires, Berlin, and Shanghai. The title began to be phased out in 1930 with the passage of the Foreign Agricultural Service Act, which granted USDA authority to use the diplomatic title "attaché". The last USDA employee to bear the title "agricultural commissioner" was Owen Dawson, agricultural commissioner at the U.S. Consulate in Shanghai, who received diplomatic status and the title agricultural attaché in 1939 when USDA's overseas officers were transferred to the Department of State.

Noted American author Mark Twain recounted meeting one of the 19th-century roving agricultural commissioners in Innocents Abroad:

I was proud to observe that among our excursionists were three ministers of the gospel, eight doctors, sixteen or eighteen ladies, several military and naval chieftains with sounding titles, an ample crop of "Professors" of various kinds, and a gentleman who had "COMMISSIONER OF THE UNITED STATES OF AMERICA TO EUROPE, ASIA, AND AFRICA" thundering after his name in one awful blast! I had carefully prepared myself to take rather a back seat in that ship because of the uncommonly select material that would alone be permitted to pass through the camel's eye of that committee on credentials; I had schooled myself to expect an imposing array of military and naval heroes and to have to set that back seat still further back in consequence of it may be, but I state frankly that I was all unprepared for this crusher.

I fell under that titular avalanche a torn and blighted thing. I said that if that potentate must go over in our ship, why, I supposed he must – but that to my thinking, when the United States considered it necessary to send a dignitary of that tonnage across the ocean, it would be in better taste, and safer, to take him apart and cart him over in sections in several ships.

Ah, if I had only known then that he was only a common mortal, and that his mission had nothing more overpowering about it than the collecting of seeds and uncommon yams and extraordinary cabbages and peculiar bullfrogs for that poor, useless, innocent, mildewed old fossil the Smithsonian Institute [sic], I would have felt so much relieved.

==== U.S. Department of Commerce ====
Following unification of the U.S. Foreign Service under the Rogers Act in 1924, overseas trade promotion shifted from consuls of the United States to "trade commissioners" employed by the U.S. Department of Commerce. Most but not all trade commissioners were retitled commercial attachés upon creation of the Foreign Commerce Service (viz.) in 1927. The title "trade commissioner" went out of use in the United States when Commerce's overseas officials were transferred to the Department of State and all three U.S. foreign services (of the Departments of State, Agriculture and Commerce) were merged in 1939 under Reorganization Plan No. II.

== Non-public entities ==
=== The Salvation Army ===
In The Salvation Army, the rank of commissioner is the second-highest attainable rank and the highest rank by appointment, as the rank of general is attained by election by the High Council. It is one of the original ranks of the Army and has been in use since 1880, the first commissioner was George Scott Railton.

=== Scouting ===
Within the Scout Movement, a commissioner is a senior adult leader who is responsible for the management of an aspect of Scouting and/or the leadership of other adults, as opposed to adult leaders who lead youth members.

=== Boy Scouts of America ===
Commissioners are district and council leaders who help Scout units succeed. They coach and consult with adult leaders of Cub Scout packs, Boy Scout troops, and Venturing crews. Commissioners help maintain the standards of the Boy Scouts of America.

=== Sports ===
In some sports leagues, including all four North American professional major sports the commissioner is the highest executive position in the league. The exact powers of the commissioner depend on the constitution and/or rules of the league, and are invariably limited by State and Federal Law and collective bargaining agreements. Commissioners are elected by the owners of the league's clubs or board of directors/governors, and function as executive directors of the various owner's associations describing themselves as Leagues and handle matters such as discipline, arbitration of disputes between the clubs, etc. in the interests of the owners.

The title was first used in 1920, when Kenesaw Mountain Landis was appointed Commissioner of Baseball in the aftermath of the Black Sox Scandal. Landis was titled "commissioner" partly to distinguish his office from that of the "president" of the American and National Leagues. Landis' title derived from the National Commission, the ruling body for baseball established in 1903, when the two leagues were largely autonomous organizations. The commission originally consisted of three members. Desperate to restore public confidence in their sport's integrity, baseball owners agreed to appoint Landis as the game's sole commissioner after he rebuffed their offer of a position at the head of a reformed commission. Baseball owners also gave Landis absolute power and a lifetime contract, which permitted the former judge to assume more power over the sport than a commissioner in any sport has held since.

The other major professional sports leagues of North America followed suit, either replacing their positions of league president with that of the commissioner or appointing a commissioner and reducing the position of league president to a mere figurehead role. The National Football League appointed its first commissioner in 1941. The NFL, which in its early years faced several rival leagues, intended its commissioner's office to be analogous to the one then held by Landis in baseball, with authority over all of professional football. The NFL's rivals responded by appointing their own commissioners (thereby explicitly rejecting the NFL commissioner's authority). Finally in 1966, the American Football League agreed to abolish their commissioner's office and recognize the authority of then-NFL commissioner Pete Rozelle in exchange for the NFL agreeing to a merger with its most successful rival. This did not result in any formal change to Rozelle's title or even in his powers, since the NFL constitution already purportedly granted him extensive power over other professional leagues. Nevertheless he became informally known as the football commissioner until 1970 when the merger was finalized and the AFL was fully absorbed into the NFL. No rival U.S. football league has recognized the NFL commissioner's authority since 1970, although no such league has lasted longer than three seasons.

In Canadian football, the title of commissioner dates to no later than the 1940s. Like many of the NFL's rivals south of the border, the top Canadian football leagues then in existence (the Interprovincial Rugby Football Union and Western Interprovincial Football Union) appointed commissioners in a bid to assert their leagues' independence from the NFL commissioner. When the two leagues formed an umbrella organization (the Canadian Football Council) in 1956, the posts of IRFU commissioner and WIFU commissioner were abolished and former WIFU Commissioner Sydney Halter was appointed commissioner of the CFC. When the CFC itself evolved into the modern Canadian Football League in 1958, Halter carried on in the office as that league's first commissioner.

The National Basketball Association (NBA) followed suit by appointing a commissioner in 1967, largely in response to a rival league that commenced play that year. The ABA did not recognize the NBA commissioner's authority and maintained its own commissioner's office until merging with the NBA in 1976. The National Hockey League (NHL) did not follow suit when the rival World Hockey Association commenced playing, as then-NHL president Clarence Campbell, who was openly hostile to the WHA's very existence, made clear he was not interested in any change to his own title. The NHL finally appointed a commissioner in 1993 (long after merging with the WHA) when incumbent Gary Bettman assumed office. Major League Soccer (MLS) appointed a commissioner upon its founding later that year.

The use of "commissioner" has been less prevalent in top-level women's leagues. When the NBA founded the Women's National Basketball Association (WNBA) in 1996, it chose to use the title of "president" for that league's chief executive, and did not use the title of "commissioner" for that position until 2019. The National Women's Soccer League (NWSL), founded in 2012 with play starting in 2013, initially called its chief executive "commissioner", but that position had been vacant after the resignation of the league's second commissioner, Jeff Plush, shortly before the 2017 season. The NWSL's highest office was styled as "president" until the "commissioner" title was reinstated when Lisa Baird filled that post in 2020. Due to the unique ownership structure of the Professional Women's Hockey League, the organization has no current plans to appoint a commissioner.

In general, the commissioners' powers and responsibilities in the NFL, NBA and NHL are not substantially different from those of the presidents that preceded them. Although baseball's subsequent commissioners have not had the absolute power that Landis did, former Commissioner Bud Selig has succeeded in centralizing authority over Major League Baseball in the commissioner's office, relegating the position of league president to an honorary title and giving baseball's commissioner competencies similar to those of his colleagues in the other major sports.

Many minor professional and amateur leagues throughout the United States and Canada have also appointed commissioners. The title has not caught on outside North America. In Great Britain, the title chief executive is used for the most closely equivalent position in that country's professional leagues. A key difference between the state of affairs in North America and Europe is that most European sports (including those in Great Britain) include powerful governing bodies that operate independently of and hold some power over the professional leagues, whereas in North America the equivalent governing bodies' de facto authority is mostly confined to amateur sport. For example, while the Premier League is roughly as lucrative and wealthy as the "Big Four" North American leagues, the Football Association nevertheless has the power to veto the appointment of that league's chief executive.

The Australian Football League is governed by the AFL Commission, whose members are called commissioners. However, the head of the commission, who is the closest equivalent to a North American sports commissioner, is formally titled the chairman, and is never referred to as a commissioner.

Current commissioners of the North American professional leagues are:

- Roger Goodell in the NFL
- Rob Manfred in MLB (and MiLB)
- Adam Silver in the NBA
- Gary Bettman in the NHL
- Don Garber in MLS
- Stewart Johnston in the CFL
- Russ Brandon in the UFL
- Cathy Engelbert in the WNBA
- Lisa Baird in the NWSL

== Compound titles ==
In many cases, the term commissioner is part of a more specific title, including English renditions of such titles in other languages. Examples (in some cases there are further compounds) include:

- Assistant commissioner
- Chief commissioner
- Civil commissioner
- Commissioner of finance
- Commissioner of public lands
- Commissioner of public works
- Commissioner-General
- Deputy commissioner
- District commissioner
- Divisional commissioner
- Extraordinary commissioner
- Fire commissioner
- Football match commissioner
- High commissioner
- Imperial commissioner
- Insurance commissioner
- Judicial commissioner
- Lord Commissioner of the Admiralty
- Lord High Commissioner and its further compounds, notably Lord High Commissioner to the General Assembly of the Church of Scotland and Lord High Commissioner to the Parliament of Scotland
- Military and civil commissioner
- Park commissioner
- Police commissioner
- Territorial commissioner
- Resident Commissioner
- Regional Provident Fund Commissioner
- Royal commissioner
- Scout commissioner
- Special commissioner
- Trade commissioner

== See also ==
- Ombudsman
- List of commissioners of the New South Wales Police
- List of Northwest Territories commissioners
- List of Nunavut commissioners
- List of Yukon commissioners
