= Archimede Mischi =

Italian Blackshirt general

- Born: 26 March 1885; Forlì, Kingdom of Italy
- Died: 15 August 1970 (aged 85); Forlì, Italy
- Military career
- Allegiance: Kingdom of Italy; Italian Social Republic
- Branch: Royal Italian Army; MVSN; National Republican Army
- Rank: Lieutenant General
- Commands: 171st Blackshirt Legion "Vespri di Palermo"; 82nd Blackshirt Legion "Benito Mussolini"; 80th Blackshirt Legion "Alessandro Farnese"; 2nd Libyan MVSN Legion "Berenice"; 6th CC.NN. Division "Tevere"; 6th Blackshirt Mixed Brigade "Tevere"; Border Militia; Commander-General of the Carabinieri of the Italian Social Republic; Chief of Staff of the ENR
- Conflicts: First Italo-Senussi War; World War I; Battles of the Isonzo; Battle of Asiago; Second Italo-Ethiopian War; World War II; Greco-Italian War; Italian Civil War
- Awards: Silver Medal of Military Valor (five times); War Merit Cross (twice); Military Order of Savoy; Order of the Crown of Italy; Colonial Order of the Star of Italy

Archimede Mischi (Forlì, 26 March 1885 – 15 August 1970) was an Italian Blackshirt general during World War II.

== Biography ==
He was born in Forlì on March 26, 1885, the son of Ulisse Mischi and Rosa Silvagni. Having enlisted in the Royal Italian Army in November 1894, he was admitted to attend the Royal Military Academy of Infantry and Cavalry of Modena, graduating with the rank of infantry second lieutenant, assigned to the 1st Grenadiers of Sardinia Regiment. In 1908 he received an honorable mention for his participation in the rescue effort after the Messina earthquake. He was promoted to lieutenant in July 1909, and starting from September 1912 he fought in Libya with the grenadiers battalion, returning to Italy in July 1913. In September of the same year he entered service at the 6th Infantry Regiment of the Aosta Infantry Brigade, and on the following 28 December he married Miss Michela Vitrano, with whom he had two children. He was then assigned to the 19th Infantry Regiment and promoted to captain in December 1914, and in the following January he was transferred to the 142nd Infantry Regiment of the Catanzaro Infantry Brigade, where he was when the Kingdom of Italy entered the First World War on May 24, 1915.

On July 26 he distinguished himself in the fighting on the Karst plateau, being awarded his first Silver Medal of Military Valor and being temporarily given command of his battalion; he was awarded another Silver Medal for his role in the fighting in Bosco Cappuccio between 21 October and 1 November 1915, during the Third Battle of the Isonzo, where he was again wounded and promoted to major for war merit. On August 6, 1916 he was wounded for the third time on Monte San Michele, this earning a third silver medal and; in October of the same year, for having distinguished himself in the defense of Monte Cengio during the Battle of Asiago, he was awarded the Knight's Cross of the Military Order of Savoy. On January 26, 1917 he was transferred to the 90th Infantry Regiment of the Salerno Brigade, commanding a reinforced battalion during the attack on the enemy trenches located at Hudi Log (Monte Ermada), on the Karst plateau, being again wounded (in his left arm, which was left permanently disabled) and awarded a fourth Silver Medal for military valor. He was hospitalized and on 25 November he was promoted to lieutenant colonel; after recovering, on 3 July 1917 he was posted in Genoa, but his precarious health conditions forced him to a prolonged stay at the physiotherapy center of the VII Army Corps, which lasted from 14 August 1918 to 6 December 1919. From December 1918 to April 1919 he was part of a commission tasked with questioning repatriated prisoners of war in Ferrara.

On December 6, 1919 he was assigned to the 81st Infantry Regiment "Torino" in Rome, temporarily made available to the Ministry of the Interior, after which he was temporarily transferred to the 226th Infantry Regiment on 19 October 1920 and, ten days later, to the 6th Infantry Regiment stationed in Palermo. In Palermo on 7 July 1921 he was appointed alternate judge at the Special Military Court, maintaining this position until 4 May 1924. On 22 October 1922 he was assigned to the local school for reserve officers and non-commissioned officers, where he remained until 14 March 1926, when he was placed on leave at his request. He was promoted to colonel on 2 February 1927, and on 27 April 1927 he joined the Volunteer Militia for National Security with the rank of console (equivalent to Army colonel), assuming command of the 171st Blackshirt Legion "Vespri di Palermo". He requested to be sent to the front in Libya to participate in the operations against the Senussi rebels, but his request was rejected. In 1928 he met Benito Mussolini for the first time in Rome, who tasked him with reorganizing the 82nd Blackshirt Legion "Benito Mussolini" of Forlì. In January 1929 he joined the Federal Directory, and in September of the same year he became president of the Provincial Veterans' Federation. In March 1930 he was received again by Mussolini, to whom he again expressed the desire to leave for Libya, but the Duce instead gave him command the 80th Blackshirt Legion "Alessandro Farnese" of Parma. In October 1932 he was temporarily recalled into service with the Royal Italian Army at the disposal of the Ministry of Colonies, being sent to Cyrenaica at the command of the 2nd Libyan MVSN Legion "Berenice". Military operations for the pacification of the colony were however over, and Mischi’s troops were only given garrison tasks; in September 1934 he was promoted to MVSN console generale, and on June 20, 1935 he was promoted to brigadier general of the Royal Italian Army for exceptional merits.

In anticipation of the outbreak of the war with Ethiopia, on 3 June 1935 he was appointed deputy commander of the 3rd CC.NN. Division "21 Aprile", landing in Eritrea on 12 September of the same year. During the war he distinguished himself on February 29, 1936 in an action in Ahab Saat, for which he was awarded his fifth Silver Medal for military valor. After the end of hostilities he remained in Italian East Africa, taking command, on 25 September 1936, of the 6th CC.NN. Division "Tevere", participating in operations against Ethiopian troops loyal to Ras Desta Damtew. He was later promoted to luogotenente generale (Major General) of the MVSN on 21 June 1937, and Major General of the Army in November; in December 1937 he assumed the position of Inspector of the Blackshirts in Italian East Africa while also holding the command of the 6th Blackshirt Mixed Brigade "Tevere". During his stay in East Africa he also carried out political and administrative duties as commissioner, first in Mojo and then in Dessie.

Returning to Italy on 1 September 1938, in May of the following year he was appointed commander of the Border Militia, the MVSN branch tasked with the surveillance of the land borders of the Kingdom of Italy in order to prevent clandestine entries and expatriations, with headquarters in Turin and four legions stationed throughout the Alps, with a total of 120 officers and 2,200 non-commissioned officers and soldiers. Except for a period between January and October 1941, when he was seconded attached to the 11th Army on the Greek-Albanian front as MVSN liaison officer, he was commander of the Border Militia until 1943. On 1 January 1942 he was promoted to Lieutenant General; during the final phase of his period of command, the border militia was engaged in numerous clashes with Yugoslav partisans in the Julian March and in the annexed areas around Fiume and Ljubljana.

Shortly after the fall of Fascism, on 9 August 1943, Mischi resigned from his post as commander of the Border Militia and was placed at the disposal of the general command of the MVSN. After the Armistice of Cassibile, the German occupation of Italy and the birth of the Italian Social Republic in September 1943, he presented himself in Rome to Marshal of Italy Rodolfo Graziani, Minister of National Defense of the RSI, who on 3 October appointed him Commander of the Carabinieri. He then left the capital to talk with Mussolini, who was at the Rocca delle Caminate, and was thus absent from Rome when on 6 October the German command imposed the disarmament and internment in Germany of the Carabinieri of Rome. The news of this incident, which soon spread throughout Italy, greatly hampered his attempts to reorganize the Carabinieri units of central and northern Italy as a force loyal to the Italian Social Republic. Finally, on 8 December 1943 the Carabinieri were formally dissolved and merged with the MVSN into the new Republican National Guard.

On January 2, 1944 Mischi was appointed chairman of the commission tasked with reviewing the former officers of the Royal Italian Army who wanted to pass through the newly established National Republican Army (ENR). On May 14, when the Chief of Staff of the ENR, General Gastone Gambara, fell ill, Mischi was chosen to replace him; however, having never attended the Army War School or any other specialization course, he felt unprepared to fill this position, in addition to resenting the subordinate position of the RSI armed forces towards the German commands (the ENR General Staff had no autonomy over the operational plans and the use of the troops on the front against the Allies, and its efforts were mainly oriented to the contrast of the Italian Resistance). At the end of July, while retaining the position of Chief of Staff, he received direct orders from Graziani to "normalize" Piedmont, where partisan activity was rampant, employing a division that would have been specially set up for this purpose. He thus spent the remainder of the war fighting the partisans in Piedmont, while continuing to maintain relations with the commanders of the other military areas, and trying to maintain the unity of direction of the various ENR units through a series of inspections, the last of which he held at the end of March 1945, inspecting the troops deployed along the Adriatic coast.

Mischi opposed the idea of the Valtellina Redoubt, and in the days of the collapse of the Italian Social Republic he retreated from Milan to Lecco, where on 25 April 1945 he attempted suicide by cutting his wrists at the Albergo Moderno. Admitted to hospital in a state of coma, as soon as he recovered he was imprisoned in the Coltano prisoner-of-war camp and then handed over by the Allies to the Italian authorities. He was tried by the Special Court of Assizes of Turin for a series of war crimes related to his activity in Italian Social Republic, committed by troops under his command in Piedmont; he however successfully raised doubts about the impartiality of that tribunal and on 3 June 1947 he obtained the transfer of his case to the Court of Assizes of Rome. The trial was held between November 13 and December 3, 1947, with the prosecutor requesting the death penalty; he was acquitted of some charges and sentenced to eighteen years in prison for the others, of which six were pardoned. He was then imprisoned in the military prison of Forte Boccea until January 1950, when he was released. On 3 June 1952 he was fully rehabilitated by the Court of Appeal of Rome, and on 18 October 1955 the Court of Cassation overturned the 1947 sentence "for not having committed the crime". Having settled in Forlì, he joined the local section of the Italian Social Movement, dying in his hometown on August 15, 1970.

== Bibliography ==
- Crociani, Piero (2011). "MISCHI, Archimede". Dizionario Biografico degli Italiani (in Italian). Vol. 75: Miranda–Montano. Rome: Istituto dell'Enciclopedia Italiana. ISBN 978-88-12-00032-6.
