= Border Militia =

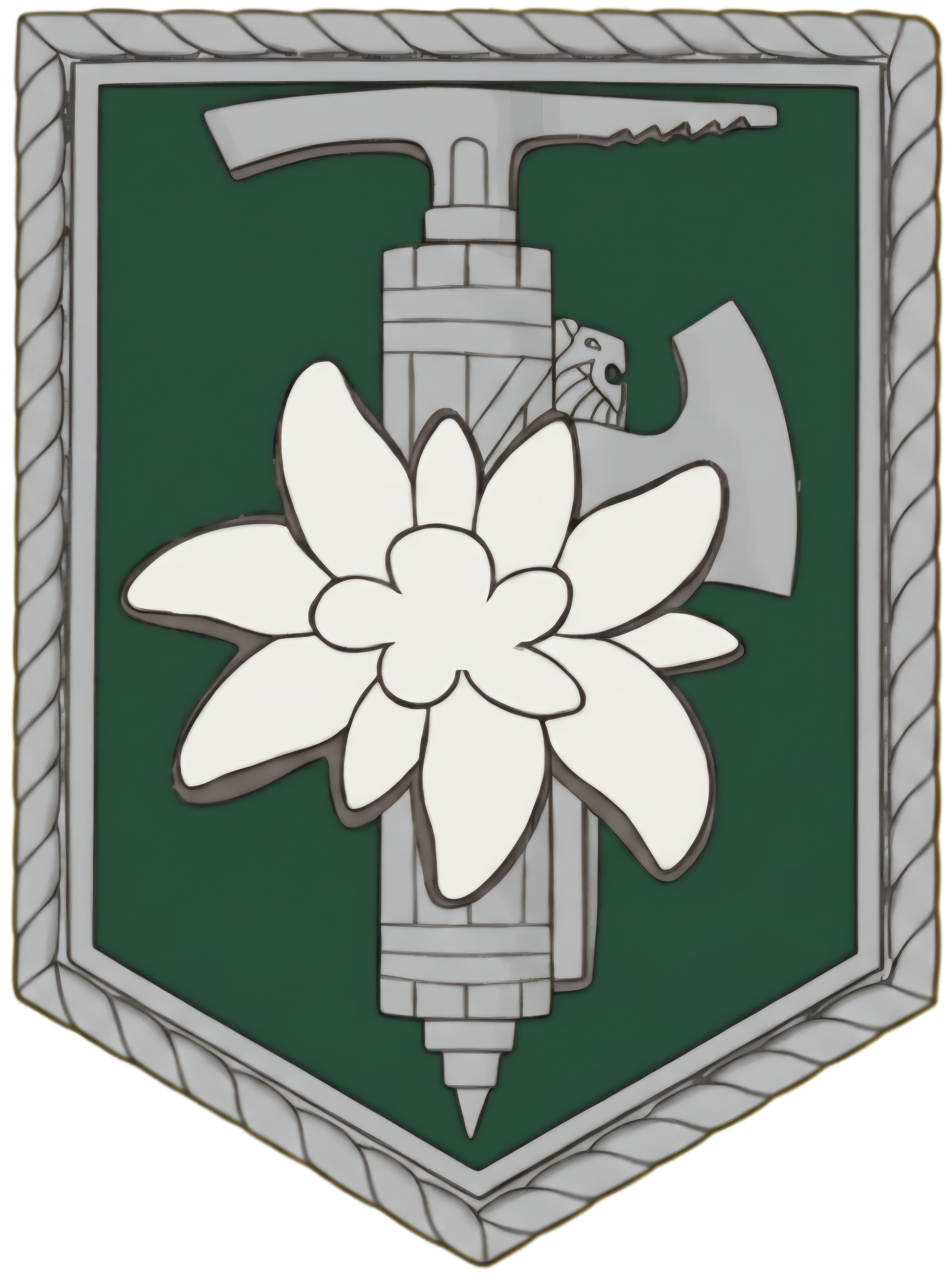

The Border Militia (Italian: Milizia Confinaria) was the branch of the Volunteer Militia for National Security entrusted with border control in Fascist Italy.

It was established on 22 November 1926, with the task of guarding Italy's frontiers and prevent illegal crossing of the border. Its members were recruited among the population of Italy's alpine villages, and essential requirements included mountain experience, good knowledge of Italy's border regions, and unquestionable Fascist faith. A school for the Frontier Militia was set up in Tolmezzo. Members of the Frontier Militia wore the standard MVSN uniform and a modified version of the Alpini hat, without feather.

In 1939 the militia was composed of four legions, the 1st "Monviso" with headquarters in Turin (which was also the seat of the central command of the Border Militia), the 2nd "Monte Rosa" with headquarters in Como, the 3rd "Vetta d’Italia" with headquarters in Bolzano, and the 4th "Monte Nevoso" with headquarters in Tolmin. Autonomous detachments existed in Cuneo, Aosta, Domodossola, Sondrio, Meran, Bruneck, and Fiume.

From May 1939 to September 1943 the Border Militia was under the command of General Archimede Mischi. During World War II the militia was involved in the battle of the Western Alps and in clashes with Yugoslav partisans in the Julian March. After the Armistice of Cassibile and the establishment of the Italian Social Republic in late 1943, the Border Militia was dissolved and replaced by the Frontier branch of the National Republican Guard.
