= Giuseppe Lombrassa =

Italian politician

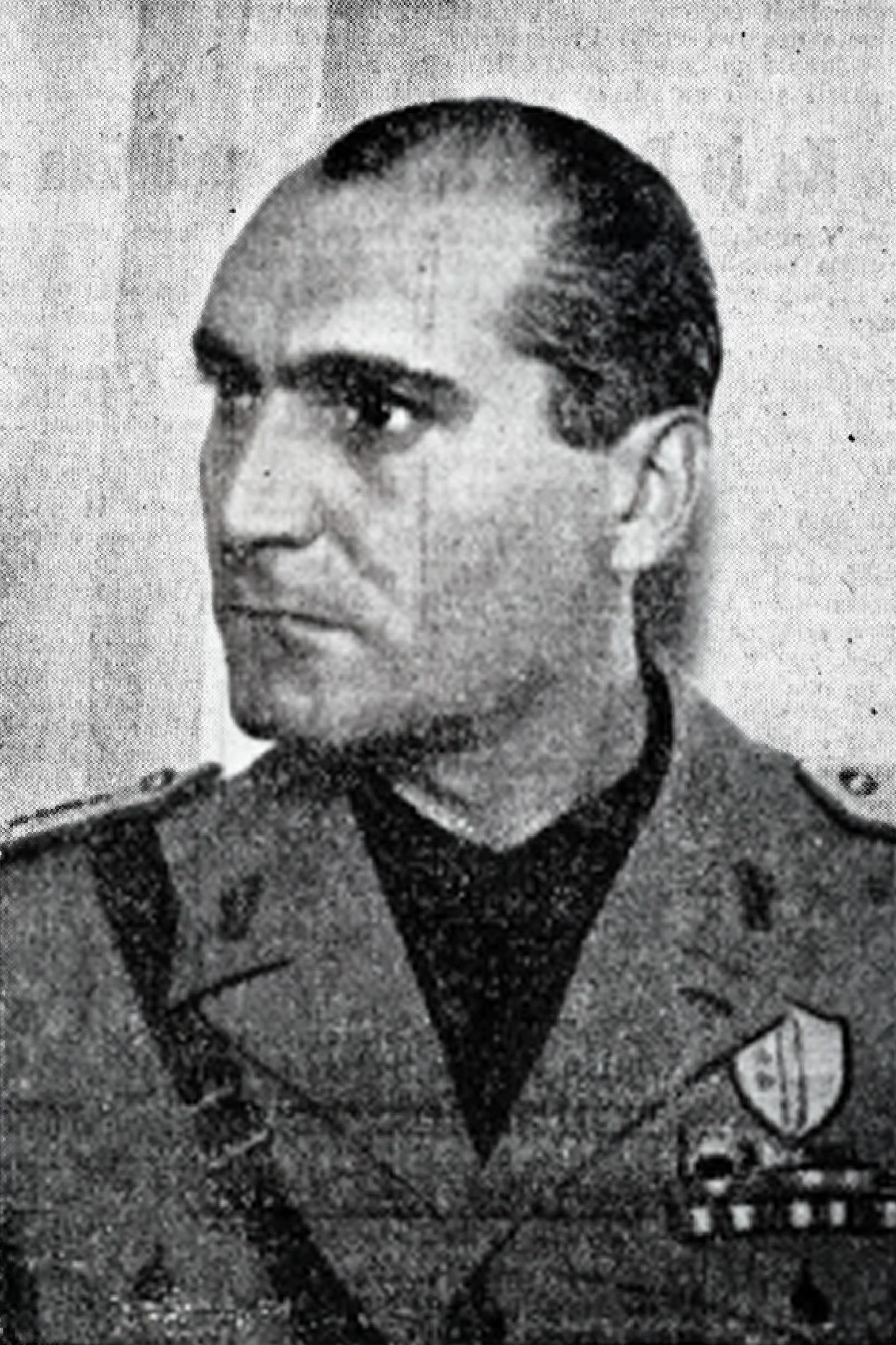
- Giuseppe Lombrassa in 1943

High Commissioner for the Province of Ljubljana
- In office 15 June 1943 – 12 August 1943
- Preceded by: Emilio Grazioli
- Succeeded by: Riccardo Moizo
- Member of the Chamber of Fasces and Corporations
- In office 23 March 1939 – 5 August 1943

State Undersecretary for Corporations
- In office 26 February 1942 – 2 June 1943

Personal details
- Born: 20 June 1906 Pesaro, Kingdom of Italy
- Died: 26 September 1966 (aged 60) Rome, Italy
- Party: National Fascist Party; Republican Fascist Party

Military service
- Allegiance: Kingdom of Italy
- Branch/service: Royal Italian Army
- Rank: Captain
- Battles/wars: Second Italo-Ethiopian War; Spanish Civil War; World War II; Greco-Italian War
- Awards: Silver Medal of Military Valor (twice); War Cross of Military Valor (twice)

Giuseppe Lombrassa (June 20, 1906-September 26, 1966) was an Italian Fascist politician and soldier, State Undersecretary for Corporations in 1942–1943, and High Commissioner for the Province of Ljubljana from June to August 1943.

== Biography ==
He joined the Fascist squads in his youth, participating in the March on Rome at age sixteen. After graduating in law, he collaborated with various Fascist magazines; during the 1930s, he fought in the Second Italo-Ethiopian War and in the Spanish Civil War, with the rank of lieutenant in the 1st Infantry Regiment "Volontari del Littorio" of the Corps of Volunteer Troops, receiving a War Cross for Military Valor and two Silver Medals of Military Valor, being wounded in action three times, and being promoted to captain for war merit. On October 31, 1938, after returning from Spain, he was appointed Undersecretary for Internal Migrations, and in 1939 he became a member of the Chamber of Fasces and Corporations.

After Italy's entry into World War II, he enlisted again in the army, fighting on the Greek front as a Captain in the 21st Infantry Division Granatieri di Sardegna, where he was awarded another War Cross for Military Valor in November 1940 and wounded in 1941. In the same year, he was appointed State Commissioner for Migration and Colonization and was involved in the recruitment campaign aimed at supplying Italian workers (Gastarbeitnehmer) to the German war industry.

On February 26, 1942, he was appointed State Undersecretary for Corporations, a post he held until June 2, 1943. In August 1942, he informed Foreign Minister Galeazzo Ciano that a serious shortage of workers was impending and that greater mobilization of the civilian population would be required for the functioning of the war industry. On June 15, 1943, he was appointed prefect and high commissioner of the province of Ljubljana, replacing Emilio Grazioli. This assignment proved to be short-lived, as Lombrassa resigned two months later following the fall of the Fascist regime and the establishment of the Badoglio government.

After the Armistice of Cassibile, Lombrassa joined the Republican Fascist Party, but did not hold important posts within the Italian Social Republic. He retired to private life after the war and died in Rome in 1966.
