= Lord High Commissioner =

Lord High Commissioner is the style of high commissioners, i.e. direct representatives of the monarch, in three cases in the Kingdom of Scotland and the United Kingdom, two of which are no longer extant. Consequently, the remaining office is often known in short simply as the Lord High Commissioner.

- Lord High Commissioner to the General Assembly of the Church of Scotland: the British sovereign's personal representative to the General Assembly of the Church of Scotland
- Lord High Commissioner to the Parliament of Scotland (1603–1707)
- Lord High Commissioners of the Ionian Islands (1816–1864)
