= Emilio Grazioli =

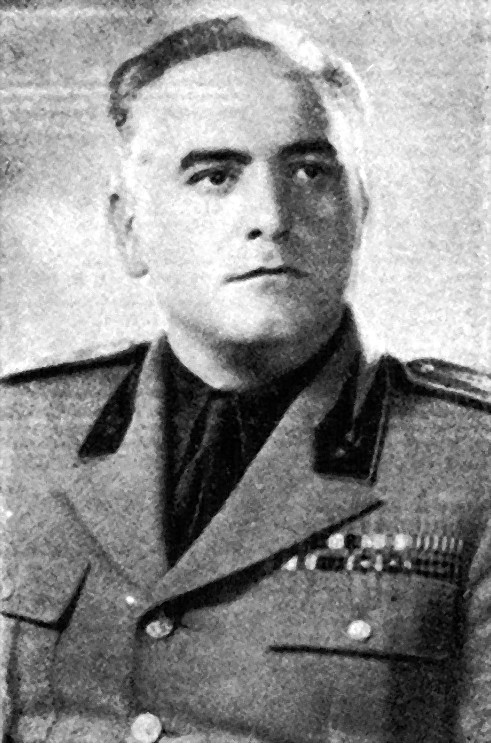

High Commissioner for the Province of Ljubljana
- In office 3 May 1941 – 15 June 1943
- Preceded by: Office created
- Succeeded by: Giuseppe Lombrassa
- Member of the Chamber of Fasces and Corporations
- In office 23 March 1939 – 5 August 1943

Personal details
- Born: 26 October 1899 Zibido San Giacomo, Kingdom of Italy
- Died: 15 June 1969 (aged 69) Milan, Italy
- Party: National Fascist Party; Republican Fascist Party

Military service
- Allegiance: Kingdom of Italy
- Branch/service: Royal Italian Army
- Years of service: 1917–1921
- Awards: War Cross of Military Valor

Emilio Grazioli (26 October 1899 – 15 June 1969) was an Italian Fascist politician and prefect, High Commissioner for the Province of Ljubljana from 1941 to 1943.

== Biography ==
=== Early life and career ===
Grazioli fought in the Royal Italian Army during World War I, being awarded a War Cross for Military Valor. He joined the Fascist movement in 1921, when he created a local section in Aurisina, and the National Fascist Party in 1921, holding various posts within the Party and reaching the rank of centurion (Captain) of the Voluntary Militia for National Security. In 1939 he became Federal Secretary of the Fascist Party for Trieste and a member of the Chamber of Fasces and Corporations.

=== High Commissioner for the Province of Ljubljana ===
On April 6, 1941, the Axis invaded Yugoslavia, which quickly capitulated. Already in mid-April Grazioli was appointed Royal Civil Commissioner of the occupied territories of Slovenia, a position converted into that of High Commissioner of the Province of Ljubljana upon its establishment on May 3, 1941. Despite a special newsletter issued by General Vittorio Ambrosio subjected the civil authorities of the occupied territories to military authority, Grazioli still tried to carry out his functions independently. On August 12, 1941, Grazioli had the public register of the population established, and a few days later made it compulsory to report new births. According to the first data collected, the population was made up of 280-400,000 inhabitants. Grazioli also had a census of the Jewish population carried out.

Grazioli began establishing in the province of Ljubljana local sections of the Fascist organizations that already existed in Italy, such as the Gioventù Italiana del Littorio and the Opera Nazionale Dopolavoro. His goal was to integrate the new province, which would still retain considerable autonomy, within the Kingdom of Italy, without alienating the sympathies of large anti-Communist sections of the population who saw in Italy a protection from the nascent Titoist movement and from harsher German occupation. All the former Slovenian officials that had been suspended following the invasion were reassigned to their posts; at Grazioli's request, the handling of public order was removed from the Army and a police station was set up in Ljubljana. Great attention was paid to the university environment, in which teachers were carefully selected and many were drawn from Lambert Ehrlich's nationalist movement "Sentinel in the Storm", but nevertheless the University of Ljubljana became a center for anti-Italian nationalist propaganda.

Grazioli's work in the early stage of the occupation was marked by respect for Slovenian culture against which no forced Italianization was initially attempted, as it was believed that more aggressive policies would result in increased hostility on part of the population, and that assimilation would in any case take place over time as a consequence of "superior" Italian culture. Grazioli's action, which differed from the policies pursued by the Fascist regime towards the Slavs of the Julian March during the interwar period, earned him the ironic nickname of "honorary Slav".

However, in the following months, acts of hostility by part of the Slovenian population began to take place more and more openly and Grazioli, following the killing of a German soldier, ordered a large round-up led by the Ljubljana police headquarters starting from 1 August. Several attacks on the railway line between Postojna and Ljubljana were also carried out. Meanwhile, military authorities, represented by General Mario Robotti, following the rise in partisan activity, began to complain about the particular "legal status" of the province, which prevented “energic” actions. On 11 September 1941 Grazioli, in an attempt to demonstrate to the military that he was able to maintain control over the province, issued a ban that imposed the death penalty for those who had taken part in attacks against the Italian military and ordered a massive round-up south of Ljubljana. The operation was however unsuccessful, and Robotti was thus able to exclude Grazioli from other military operations, relegating to the administration of the capital.

Partisan attacks meanwhile continued, leading between September and October to the wounding of Slovenian general Leon Rupnik and the killing of two Italian soldiers; yet Grazioli, believing that the situation was still manageable, continued to oppose a militarization of the province. Attacks on Italian garrisons, however, convinced Robotti that he was operating in a hostile country in which the population openly sided with the partisans, leading him to decide that in case of attacks a rapid and violent reaction would be justified, including setting villages on fire.

On 7 November the first official meeting took place between the civil authority represented by Grazioli and the military authority represented by Robotti, in which mutual conflicts of competence were discussed. It was decided that in any case round-ups would be the prerogative of the army; additionally, a military court was created in Ljubljana by the 2nd Army, and the Special Tribunal for the Defense of the State of Trieste extended its jurisdiction to Slovenia. In early December, demonstrations against Italian occupation took place, including a bomb attack in Ljubljana that caused no casualties but resulted in Italian soldiers and blackshirts opening fire and killing two Slovene civilians; Grazioli tried to minimize these events and emphasized the reaction of the garrison soldiers, who had let the situation “slip away” and opened fire on civilians. In the following days several Italian soldiers were killed in ambushes, followed by round-ups by the Italian authorities.

In the same days, the Special Tribunal began its first major trial against 56 Slovenes arrested in the previous months during the round-ups. During the trial Grazioli received numerous requests for clemency from exponents of pro-Italian collaborationism, including Marko Natlačen, Drago Marušič, the mayor of Ljubljana Juro Adlešič, deputy mayor Vzodimir Ravnihar and bishop Gregorij Rozman. The trial ended on December 14 with nine death sentences and numerous prison sentences; after the applications for clemency submitted in the previous days, four death sentences were commuted to life sentences. On December 16 the military court of Ljubljana sentenced to death seven partisans captured with weapons who were shot on the following day.

On January 19, 1942, General Vittorio Ambrosio was promoted to Chief of the General Staff, and replaced by General Mario Roatta as commander of the 2nd Army. Roatta immediately switched to a more aggressive conduct in fighting the Resistance, also strengthened by a new decree which established that military authority could to intervene when expressly requested by the High Commissioner but also on its own initiative, merely informing civilian authorities. During a new meeting held in Ljubljana on February 5, 1942, the situation between Grazioli and Robotti was discussed and Grazioli was effectively deprived of the possibility of using military units to conduct autonomous actions, his authority being restricted to the use of the police and of the carabinieri, for investigations and prevention.

On February 21, 1942 the presence in Ljubljana of the operational center of the Slovenian resistance was reported to the police. Two days later, Grazioli and Robotti decided to implement a complete blockade of the city, which was surrounded with barbed wire and checkpoints to prevent the escape of suspects, restricting passage only to holders of a special pass. Once the blockade was completed, the entire city was rounded up by units of the Grenadiers of Sardinia, the police and the MVSN. On February 28, two hundred people were arrested, including Communist leader Tone Tomšič, who was then shot in the following May. Although several Communist leaders managed to escape, their organization was decimated and had to be reconstituted outside the city.

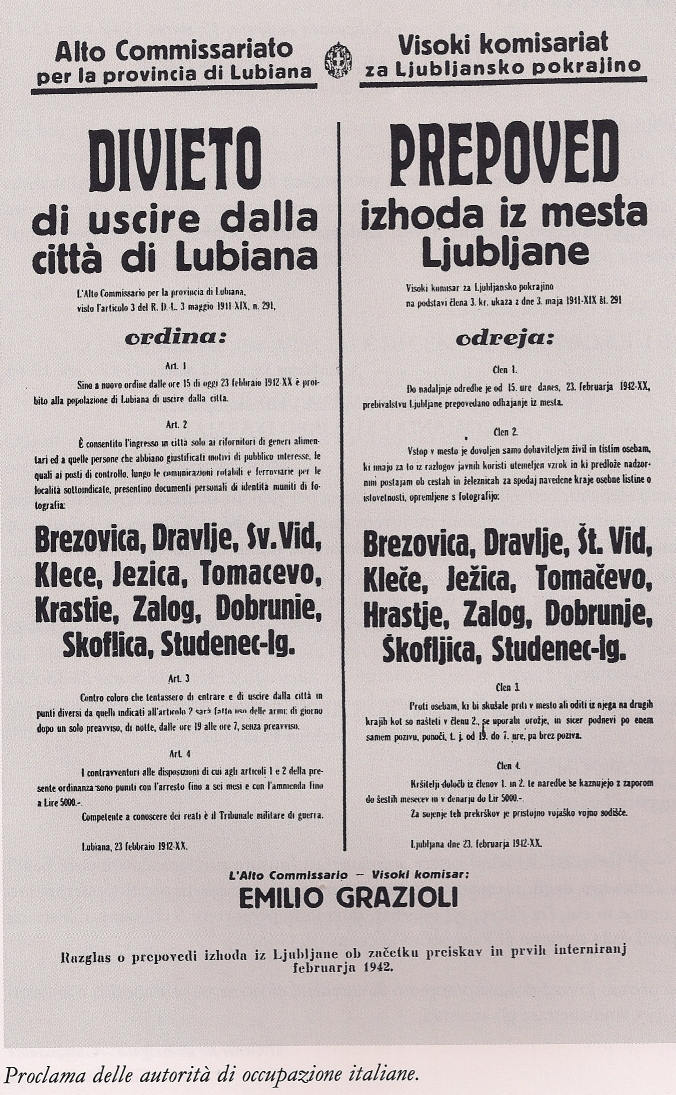
Grazioli's proclamation, forbidding the population of Ljubljana from leaving the city

Following this, partisans attacks escalated, resulting in the killing of several collaborators; Italian troops reacted by setting some villages south of Ljubljana on fire and indiscriminately killing civilians. Grazioli, who tried in vain to stem the military escalation, considered such military actions a mistakes, likening them to those carried out by the Germans in northern Slovenia, which had pushed many Slovenians to side with the partisans. Starting from 23 March, despite the negative opinion of the police headquarters and the Carabinieri commands, Grazioli obtained that the law enforcement agencies employed by him replace the soldiers at the gates of the fence that surrounded Ljubljana. The blocks were then removed on December 30 of the same year.

In order to protect the old Italian border and prevent the partisans from reaching the territories inhabited by Italians, Grazioli arranged a cohort of the Border Militia. In April the partisans targeted Fascist institutions and Slovenian collaborators with numerous killings, and Grazioli and Robotti decided during a meeting that for every Italian soldier killed, reprisals would be carried out on partisans and sympathizers already detained; a proclamation to this effect was issued to the population. Later that month, eight partisans held in the Ljubljana prison were executed in reprisal for the killing of several Slovenian collaborators. In the meantime, Grazioli decided to intensify patrol services within the city by using army troops and even members of the local PNF section. Seeing the possibility of obtaining a pacification of the region fade, Grazioli accepted the repressive measures of the military authorities, and contributed with the request to Rome of another 1,300 carabinieri to reinforce the garrisons.

In early May, forty political prisoners were shot in Ljubljana in reprisal for a partisan attack in which 27 Italian soldiers had been killed and 81 wounded. On 27 May Robotti, taking advantage of the absence of Grazioli (who was in Rome for reasons of service), issued orders that placed all the police forces of Slovenia under his command. Grazioli protested, especially with regards to the police headquarters in Ljubljana, but in the end he had to give in.

After the summer of 1942, the situation in Ljubljana started to change, with rising hostility towards the Communist-inspired partisan movement by parts of the population, as the Catholic, Belagardist and nationalist movements advocated collaborationism with the Italians. Grazioli, in order to encourage a return to normality, on 17 September requested the army to evacuate all the school buildings occupied in the summer in Ljubljana and in other cities in order to restart the school year regularly. The situation in Ljubljana remained calm until 8 October, when the partisans killed police commissioner Kazimir Kuković and on 13 October the ex ban (prefect) of Yugoslav Slovenia, Marko Natlačen. Grazioli responded harshly to the killing of the latter, by shooting 32 political prisoners taken from prisons. Meanwhile, the death of Natlačen, the rising prospects of an Allied victory in the war and the dilution of the communist positions of the Slovenian People's Liberation Front led once again to a diminished sympathy of the Slovenes towards the Italians, especially in the most important cities.

With major military operations now concluded, on 16 January 1943 Grazioli sent a letter to Rome requesting to restore civilian authority in the province, and above all to limit the activity of the military tribunal, which had in fact replaced the ordinary tribunal. After long discussions, on May 17 Grazioli's requests were rejected by the Ministry of Justice, as were his continuous request to extend Italian legislation to the new annexed province.

=== Later career ===
On 15 June 1943 Grazioli was replaced by Giuseppe Lombrassa as High Commissioner for the Province of Ljubljana, and was appointed prefect of Catania. He had barely settled there, however, when he was forced to flee by the Allied invasion of Sicily.

After the Armistice of Cassibile he moved to northern Italy, where he joined the Italian Social Republic. On 1 October 1943 he was appointed once again as High Commissioner of Ljubljana by the RSI authorities, but the head of the German occupation administration, Friedrich Rainer, forbade this, reserving all power in Slovenia for himself.

Mussolini then made Grazioli head of the Province of Bergamo, later of Ravenna and finally of Turin, participating in the persecution of Jews, anti-Fascists, and draft dodgers. On 27 April 1945 he fled from Turin and on 5 May he surrendered to Allied troops; he was held in various POW Camps and then handed over to Italian authorities to be tried for collaboration with the Nazis. He was initially sentenced to a twelve-year prison term, but this was then reduced to just four months, and he was released in 1946.

He then retired to private life, being unsuccessfully requested for extradition by the Socialist Federal Republic of Yugoslavia. He died in Milan in 1969.
