= Extraordinary commission =

Extraordinary Commission or Emergency Commission most often refers to:

== Organisations ==
- The Commission extraordinaire des Douze or Extraordinary Commission of Twelve, which prosecuted political conspirators in France during 1793
- A literal translation of the Russian language term Чрезвычайная Комиссия (Chrezvychaynaya Komissiya, Extraordinary/Emergency Commission), which had the Cyrillic initials ЧК (ChK) pronounced tche-ka, such as:
  - The Cheka, a colloquial name for the Soviet secret police from 1918 as well as national affiliates such as:
    - The All-Ukrainian Extraordinary Commission (VUChK) in 1918–1922
  - The Soviet Extraordinary State Commission (ChGK) of 1942–1947, which investigated war crimes committed by Axis forces

== Other uses ==
- A commission (document) affirming the appointment of a particular person as a government official or military officer, under extraordinary or emergency conditions
