= Province of Ljubljana =

Province in Italian-annexed Slovenia (1941–1943)

Coordinates: 46.0556°N 14.5083°E

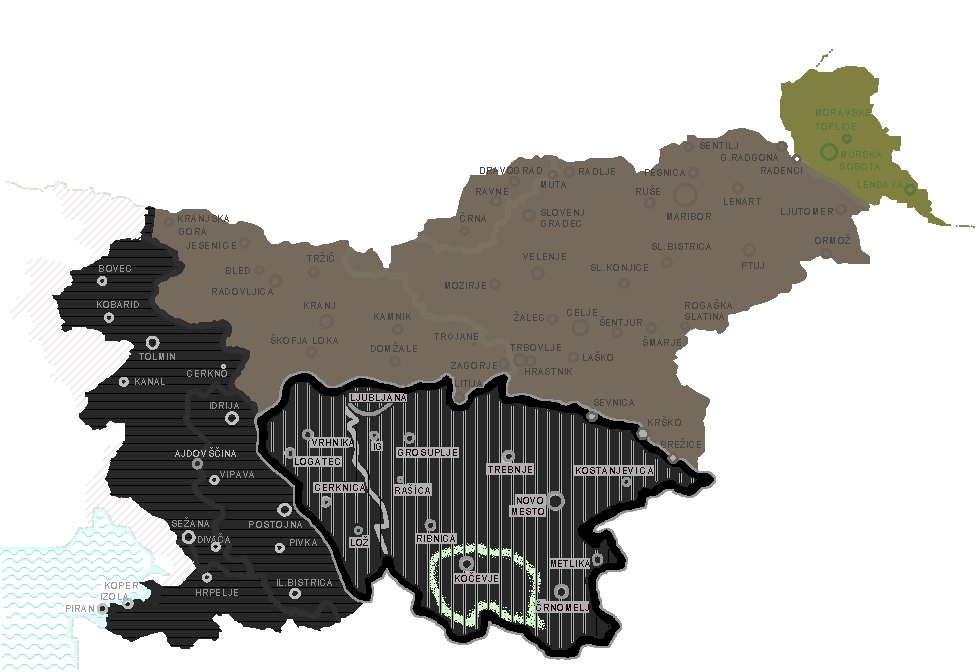
During World War II, Nazi Germany and Hungary occupied and annexed the northern areas (brown and dark green areas, respectively), while Fascist Italy occupied the vertically hashed black area, including the Gottschee area (the solid black western part had already been annexed by Italy with the Treaty of Rapallo). After 1943, Germany took over the Italian occupational area as well.

The Province of Ljubljana (Italian: Provincia di Lubiana, Slovene: Ljubljanska pokrajina, German: Provinz Laibach) was the central-southern area of Slovenia. In 1941, it was annexed by Fascist Italy, and after 1943 occupied by Nazi Germany. Created on May 3, 1941, it was abolished on May 9, 1945, when the Slovene Partisans and partisans from other parts of Yugoslavia liberated it from the Nazi Operational Zone of the Adriatic Littoral. Its administrative centre was Ljubljana.

== Background ==
During World War II, the Drava Banovina was in a unique situation. Whereas Greece was trisected, this territory (roughly present-day Slovenia) experienced a further step—absorption and annexation into neighboring Nazi Germany, Fascist Italy, Hungary, and the Independent State of Croatia. After Yugoslavia was invaded by Axis powers on 6 April 1941, Germany and Hungary occupied and annexed the northern part of the region. The ethnic German Gottscheers were moved out of the province because Hitler opposed having them in the Italian zone.

== Territory ==
After the attack on Yugoslavia by Germany and Italy, the central area of Slovenia was occupied by Italy as a territory that had historically belonged to the County of Gorizia, the Duchy of Friuli, and the Ancient Roman provinces of Illyria, and the Roman city of Emona (modern Ljubljana) had been an important hub of communication.

The bulk of its territory was:

- Lower Carniola (except a strip of land along the Sava River, under the German occupation;
- The eastern portions of Inner Carniola (the present-day municipalities of Logatec, Cerknica, Bloke, and Loška Dolina),
- The city of Ljubljana and its southern suburbs. The northern suburbs (Šentvid) were under the German occupation.

Italy occupied Marindol and other villages that had previously belonged to the Banovina of Croatia, Milić-Selo, Paunović-Selo, Žunić-Selo, Vukobrati, Vidnjevići, and Vrhovci. These villages were annexed to the municipality of Črnomelj as part of the Province of Ljubljana, despite being predominantly inhabited by Orthodox Serbs.

After the war the inhabitants of those areas demanded to be returned to the People’s Republic of Croatia as part of the county of Karlovac. By the administrative organization of 1947, Marindol and the surrounding villages on the left bank of Kolpa constituted a local community in the composition of the county of Karlovac. It was still a constituent part of the county at the time of 1948 census. After that the complete area was under Slovene authority. Parts of the Žumberak/Gorjanci area were also annexed by Italy to the Province of Ljubljana and parts of Gorski Kotar mainly in the Čabar area (villages around Prezid), all from what was earlier part of the Banovina of Croatia. This was an agreement between the Kingdom of Italy and the Independent State of Croatia on the border between the two Axis states during the Second World War.

== Administration ==
=== The Italian period ===
==== Pre-resistance ====
Compared to the German policies in the northern Nazi-occupied area of Slovenia and the forced Fascist italianization in the former Austrian Littoral that was annexed after the First World War, the initial Italian policy in the central Slovenia was not as violent. Tens of thousands of Slovenes from German-occupied Lower Styria and Upper Carniola escaped to the Province of Ljubljana until June 1941.

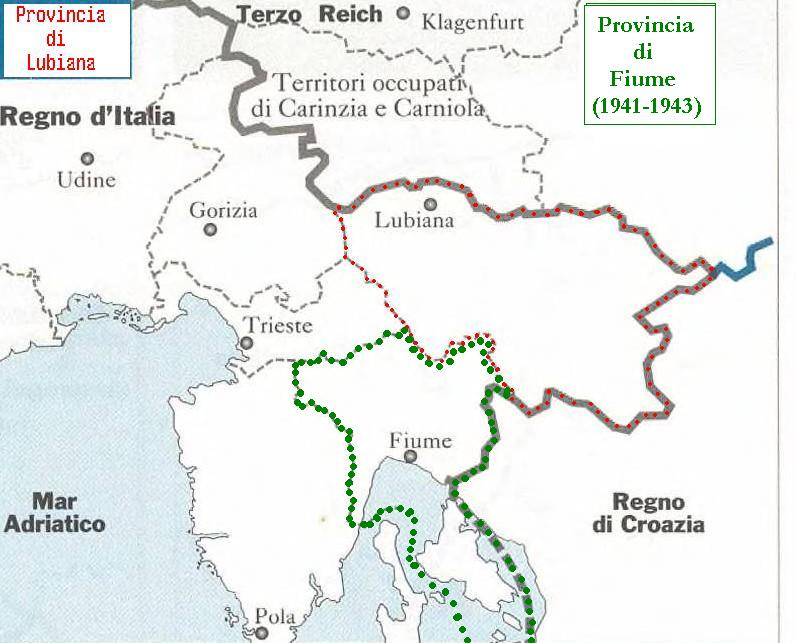
The Province of Ljubljana (Provincia di Lubiana, borders in red) inside the northeastern Kingdom of Italy

The central area of Slovenia was first occupied by the Kingdom of Italy in April 1941. It was subjected to military occupation but in May 1941, after the debellatio of the Yugoslav State by the Axis powers, it was formally annexed by the Kingdom of Italy under the name of Provincia di Lubiana. The province was created as a specific administration unit within Italy. Although considered as an integral part of Italy, it was treated as a corpus separatum. Unlike other provinces, it was administered by a High Commissioner, appointed by the Italian Government. The High Commissioner had a similar position as prefects in other Italian provinces, but was given wider competences. The first High Commissioner was Emilio Grazioli.

The province did enjoy some political or administrative autonomy and several concessions were given to the local Slovene population. In the countryside, most of the municipal administrations, elected in general elections during the Kingdom of Yugoslavia, could continue to function. Judiciary and local administration personnel were also kept. Both Italian and Slovene were given the status of official languages and also the status of an administrative language. Most Slovenian cultural and educational institutions of national importance, such as the University of Ljubljana and the Academy of Sciences and Arts, were kept. Education in Slovene was kept, although Italian was introduced as an obligatory second language. The population of the province was exempted from military service in the Italian Army.

In Slovenia for more than 3 months - after the defeat of Yugoslavia in April 15 and until the end of July - there was a "relatively quiet" peace without anti-Italian resistance, initially supported by the Slovenes who today are generically called "Domobranci" (Slovenian anti-communists). In August and September there were some sabotages, but only on October 1941 there was the first military action of Italian troops against the Slovenian resistance, when two Tito partizans were killed....At the same time in Italian Slovenia nearly 20,000 Slovenians collaborated with the Italians (as members of anticommunist organizations, from "Civic Guards" to "BelaGardists"). Sandro Bassetti

Also, the Consult was created as an advisory council of the High Commissioner's office. It was composed by members of local economic and professional associations, as well as of those political party leaders that were willing to collaborate with Italian authorities.

==== Post-resistance and war crimes against the Slovene civil population ====
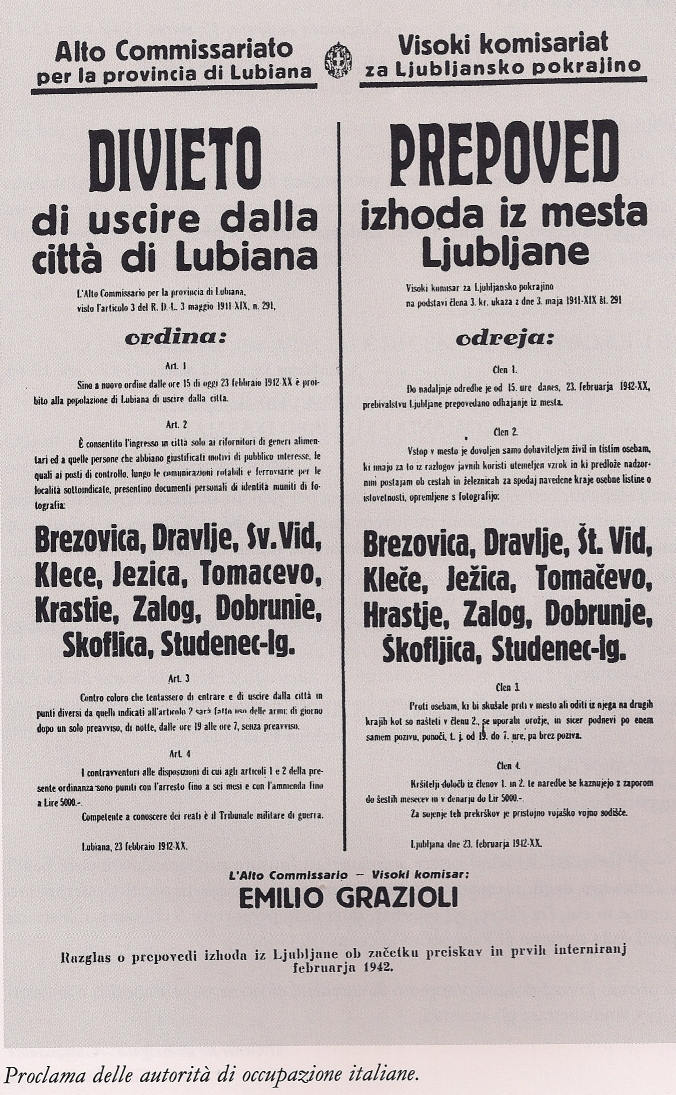
1942 announcement that exiting Ljubljana is forbidden by Fascist Italian authority

The initial tolerant policies of the Italian administration did not last long. After the establishment of the Liberation Front and the emergence of the partisan resistance, the Italian army's opinion has been in accord with the 1920s speech by Benito Mussolini:

When dealing with such a race as Slavic—inferior and barbarian—we must not pursue the carrot, but the stick policy.... We should not be afraid of new victims.... The Italian border should run across the Brenner Pass, Monte Nevoso and the Dinaric Alps.... I would say we can easily sacrifice 500,000 barbaric Slavs for 50,000 Italians....

— Benito Mussolini, speech held in Pula, 22 February 1922

As noted by Minister of Foreign Affairs in Mussolini government, Galeazzo Ciano, when describing a meeting with secretary general of the National Fascist Party Aldo Vidussoni who wanted Italian army to kill all the Slovenes:

... I took the liberty of saying they (the Slovenes) totaled one million. It doesn't matter—he replied firmly—we should model ourselves upon ascari (auxiliary Eritrean troops infamous for their cruelty) and wipe them out".

General Mario Robotti, Commander of the Italian XI Corps (Italy) in Slovenia and Croatia, issued an order in line with a directive received from Mussolini in June 1942: "I would not be opposed to all (sic) Slovenes being imprisoned and replaced by Italians. In other words, we should take steps to ensure that political and ethnic frontiers coincide", which qualifies as ethnic cleansing policy.

The Province of Ljubljana saw the deportation of 25,000 people, which equaled 7.5% of the total population. The operation, one of the most drastic in Europe, filled up Italian concentration camps on the island Rab, in Gonars, Monigo (Treviso), Renicci d'Anghiari, Chiesanuova and elsewhere.

Mario Roatta's "Circular 3C" (Circolare 3C), tantamount to a declaration of war on the Slovene civil population, involved him in war crimes while he was the commander of the 2nd Italian Army in the Province of Ljubljana.

The Italians put a barbed wire fence—which is now the route of the Trail of Remembrance and Comradeship—around Ljubljana in order to prevent communication between the Liberation Front in the city and the Partisan resistance in the surrounding countryside.

On February 25, 1942, only two days after the Italian Fascist regime established Gonars concentration camp the first transport of 5,343 internees (1,643 of whom were children) arrived from the already overpopulated Rab concentration camp, from the Province of Ljubljana itself, and from another Italian concentration camp in Monigo (near Treviso). The survivors received no compensation from Italy after the war.

The violence against the Slovene civil population easily matched the German. For every major military operation, General M. Roatta issued additional special instructions, including one that the orders must be "carried out most energetically and without any false compassion".

One of Roatta's soldiers wrote home on July 1, 1942: "We have destroyed everything from top to bottom without sparing the innocent. We kill entire families every night, beating them to death or shooting them." The idea that Italian excesses in violence was due to anger or grief at the loss of comrades is false, since the process of killing and mass execution was a consequence of Fascist propaganda, de-humanizing the Slovenes as racially inferior.

After the war, Roatta was on the list of the most sought after Italian war criminals indicted by Yugoslavia and other countries, but never saw anything like the Nuremberg Trials because the British government saw in Pietro Badoglio, also on the list, a guarantee of an anti-communist post-war Italy within the context of the Cold War. Some of the most notorious were put on trial however, including Roatta. But he escaped just before being jailed, and fled to Spain.

==== Structure ====
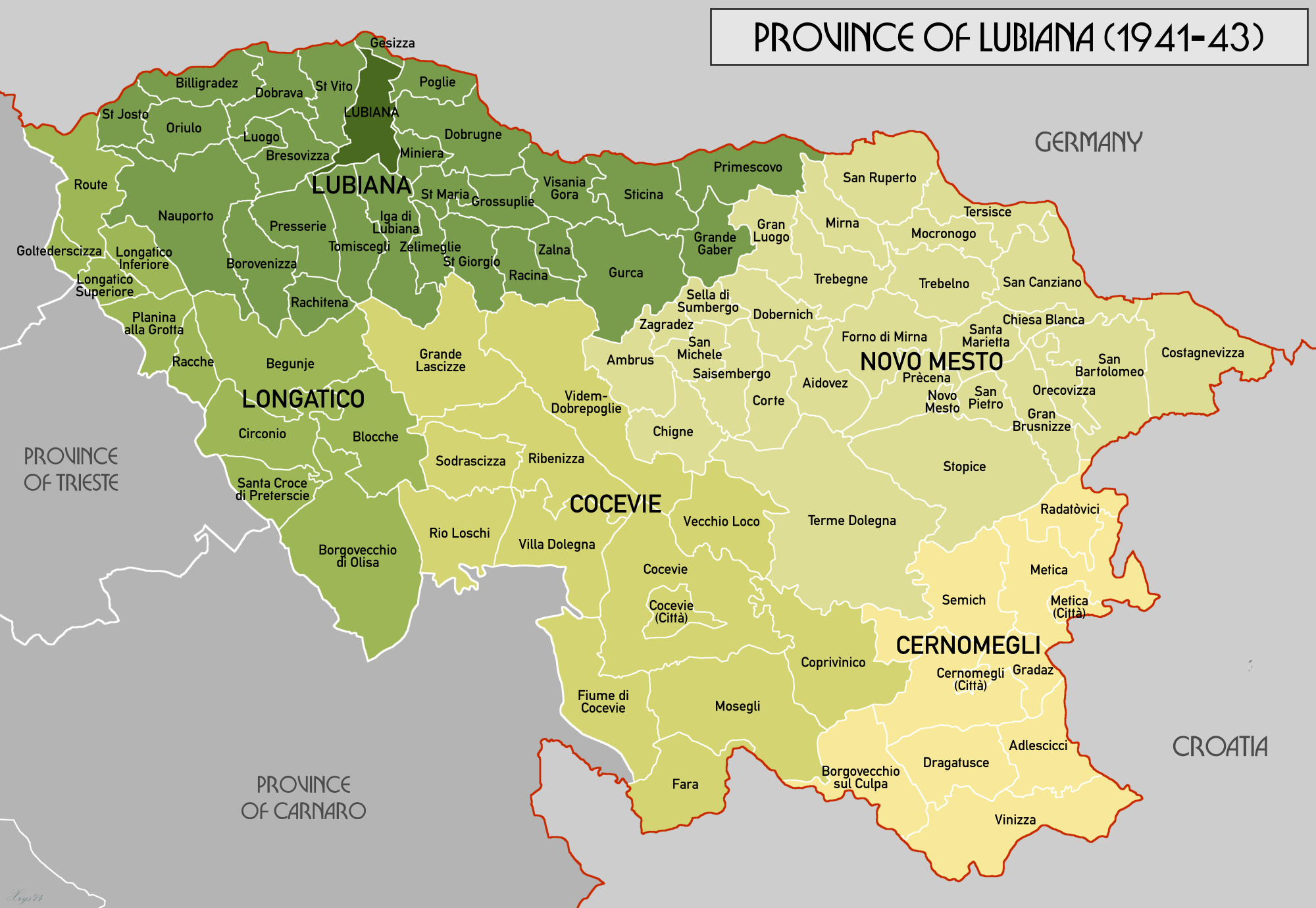
The Province of Ljubljana (1941–1943)

The province was divided into five districts (Italian: distretti) based around the pre-existing Yugoslav district boundaries, plus the city of Lubiana. Each district was further sub-divided into municipalities (Italian: comuni). The five districts were:

- Lubiana (28 municipalities)
- Longatico (11 municipalities)
- Novo Mesto (31 municipalities)
- Cernomegli (11 municipalities)
- Cocevie (13 municipalities)

=== The German period (1943–1945) ===
After the Italian armistice in September 1943, the province was occupied by Nazi Germany. The province was kept in the same borders that were set by Italian occupation forces. The province was included in the Adriatic Littoral. It was finally abolished on May 9, 1945.

=== Administration ===
During the Italian period (1941–1943), the province was ruled by a high commissioner; for most of its history this post was held by Emilio Grazioli, replaced in early 1943 by Giuseppe Lombrassa who after the fall of Fascism was in turn replaced by General Riccardo Moizo, who only held the post for a month before the Armistice of Cassibile. In the first months after the province was officially annexed to Italy (May 1941), a so-called Consultation Council (consulta) was set up from high-ranking members of local economic, professional and political elites. The first chairman of the council was Marko Natlačen, former Yugoslav governor of the Drava Banovina. Already in 1942, he stepped down in opposition to Italian occupation policies, and the Council itself ceased to be summoned.

After the German occupation in September 1943, Leon Rupnik was named president of the province. He managed to establish a fairly autonomous provincial administration with the help of a small circle of collaborators.

== Armed formations ==
In 1942, village guard units started appearing spontaneously, as a self-defense against Partisan revolutionary violence. They turned to the Italians for weapons and equipment, and the Italians soon organized them as a part of the Anti-Communist Volunteer Militia. They were called the "White Guard" by the Partisans (and even the Germans later on).

After the capitulation of Italy, most of the Slovene Chetniks were destroyed in the Battle of Grčarice (quietly helped by the Partisans, who then became the only resistance group in Slovenia) and members of the "White Guard" were killed, captured, dispersed, or fled to the Germans, where they formed the core of the newly established Slovenian Home Guard corps led by a former general of the Royal Yugoslav Army, Leon Rupnik. He became chief of the puppet provincial government of the Province of Ljubljana and came into the service of the Third Reich. Many previously captured or dispersed members of the White Guard soon joined the Slovenian Home Guard.

While the war was still going on, some of the leaders of the "White Guard" underwent a military court-martial in Kočevje and were sentenced to death. The trial was organized by the Slovenian National Liberation Council.

On the Allied side, there was the Liberation Front of the Slovenian People, which was formed on 26 April 1941 by the decision of the Central Committee of the Communist Party of Slovenia, which refrained from active participation in the fighting because the communist line at the time was that both sides were engaged in an "imperialist" war. Originally, organizations from the entire political spectrum participated; however, as the influence of the Communist Party within the Liberation Front started to grow, some of them turned against it.

== Ending ==
The area of the Province of Ljubljana after the Second World War was united with the rest of Slovene Lands that were under the control of Tito's Yugoslavia and formed the People's Republic of Slovenia in 1947, which in the meantime was called the Federal State of Slovenia (short form: Federal Slovenia).

Some of its territory was returned to Croatia but some was subsequently claimed by Slovenia.

The bulk of its territory is now the Republic of Slovenia.

== See also ==
- Liberation Front of the Slovenian People
- Anti-Communist Volunteer Militia
