= Divisional commissioner =

Divisional Commissioner may refer to:

- Divisional Commissioner (Bangladesh), a civil service rank in Bangladesh
- Divisional Commissioner (India), a civil service rank in India
- Divisional Commissioner (Pakistan), a civil service rank in Pakistan
