= High commissioner =

High-ranking executive position

High commissioner is the title of various high-ranking, special executive positions held by a commission of appointment.

The English term is also used to render various equivalent titles in other languages.

== Commonwealth ==
=== Bilateral diplomacy ===
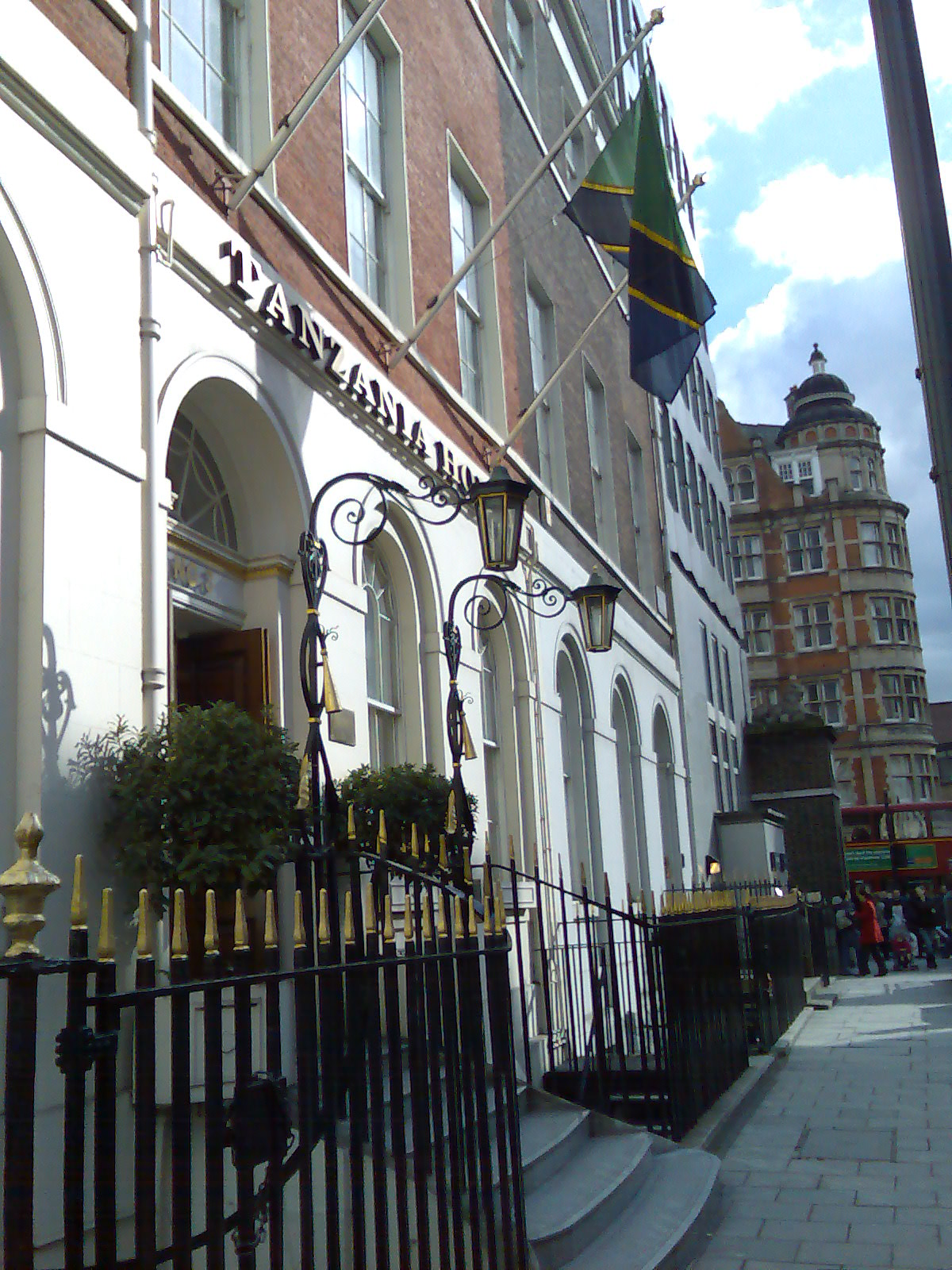
The Tanzanian High Commission in London. Tanzania and the United Kingdom are both members of the Commonwealth of Nations.

In the Commonwealth of Nations, a high commissioner is the senior diplomat (ranking as an ambassador) in charge of the diplomatic mission of one Commonwealth government to another. In this usage, a Commonwealth nation's high commission is its embassy to another Commonwealth nation.

=== British colonial usage ===
Historically, in the British Empire (most of which would become the Commonwealth) high commissioners were envoys of the imperial government appointed to manage protectorates or groups of territories not fully under the sovereignty of the British Crown, while Crown colonies (which were British sovereign territory) would normally be administered by a governor and the most significant possessions, large confederations and the independent Commonwealth Dominions would be headed by a governor-general.

An example was the island of Cyprus. Until 12 July 1878, Cyprus was under the Ottoman rule based in Istanbul. From that date, it was under British administration, but Istanbul retained nominal sovereignty until Cyprus was fully annexed by Britain on 5 November 1914. There were nine successive high commissioners, all but one already knighted, from 22 July 1878 until on 10 March 1925. Cyprus became a crown colony, and the last incumbent stayed on as its first governor.

The high commissioners for Palestine and Transjordan, who administered Mandatory Palestine, had a considerable effect on the history of Zionism and the early stages of what would become the Israeli–Palestinian conflict.

A high commission could also be charged with the last phase of a decolonisation, as in the crown colony of the Seychelles, granted autonomy on 12 November 1970: the last governor, Colin Hamilton Allen (1921–1993), stayed on as the only colonial high commissioner from 1 October 1975, when self-rule under the Crown was granted, until 28 June 1976 when the Seychelles became an independent republic within the Commonwealth.

==== British indirect rule ====
As diplomatic residents (as diplomatic ranks were codified, this became a lower class than ambassadors and high commissioners) were sometimes appointed to native rulers, high commissioners could likewise be appointed as British agents of indirect rule upon native states. Thus high commissioners could be charged with managing diplomatic relations with native rulers and their states (analogous to the resident minister), and might have under them several resident commissioners or similar agents attached to each state.

In present-day Nigeria:

- Northern Nigeria, three incumbents 1900–1907, the last of whom stayed on as first governor,
- Southern Nigeria, three incumbents 1900–1906 (four terms), the last of whom stayed on as first governor.

In certain regions of particular importance, a commissioner-general would be appointed, to have control over several high commissioners and governors, e.g. the commissioner-general for south-east Asia had responsibility for Malaya and British Borneo.

==== High commissioners as administrators ====
The role of High Commissioner for Southern Africa was coupled with that of British governor of the Cape Colony in the 19th century, giving the colonial administrator responsibility both for administering British possessions and relating to neighbouring Boer settlements. The best known of these high commissioners, Alfred Milner, who was appointed to both positions in the 1890s, is considered responsible by some for igniting the Second Boer War.

Historically, in southern Africa, the protectorates of Bechuanaland (now Botswana), Basutoland (now Lesotho) and Swaziland (now Eswatini) were administered as High Commission Territories by the governor-general of South Africa, who was also the British high commissioner for Bechuanaland, Basutoland, and Swaziland, until the 1930s, with various local representatives, and subsequently by the British high commissioner (from 1961 ambassador) to South Africa, who was represented locally in each territory by a resident commissioner.

The British governor of the crown colony of the Straits Settlements, based in Singapore, doubled as high commissioner of the Federated Malay States, and had authority over the resident-general in Kuala Lumpur, who in turn was responsible for the various residents appointed to the native rulers of the Malay states under British protection.

The High Commissioner for the Western Pacific initially exercised extraterritorial jurisdiction over British subjects in the western Pacific Ocean, but later developed into an administrative role supervising resident commissioners and other officials in British protectorates, including the British Solomon Islands Protectorate and the Gilbert and Ellice Islands Colony.

Currently there is still one high commissioner who also serves in an additional capacity as a governor: the British high commissioner to New Zealand serves ex officio as British colonial Governor of the Pitcairn Islands.

== Other territorial administrators ==
=== External territories and decolonisation ===
In the (post-)colonial sense, some other powers have or previously had high commissioners, or rather the exact equivalent in their language.

==== Kingdom of Denmark ====
In the Kingdom of Denmark, high commissioners (Danish: Rigsombudsmanden, Faroese: Ríkisumboðsmaðurin, Greenlandic: Naalagaaffiup Sinniisaa) represent the crown and the Kingdom Government (Regeringen) in Greenland and the Faroe Islands (two self-governing regions of the kingdom – the unity of the Realm) and take part in negotiations on policies and decisions affecting their region including negotiations with the devolved legislatures and the Kingdom Parliament (Folketinget). Greenland and the Faroe Islands have one commissioner each.

==== French ====
Originally the French word Haut Commissaire, or in full Haut Commissaire de la république (High Commissioner of the Republic), was rarely used for gubernatorial functions, rather (Lieutenant-)gouverneur(-général) and various lower titles. Exceptions were:

- since 22 March 1907, the colonial Gouverneur of New Caledonia was also appointed as high commissioner in the Pacific Ocean, to co-ordinate with the governors of the French settlements in Oceania and the governors-general of French Indochina; the French resident commissioner of the Anglo-French condominium Nouvelles Hébrides and the residents to the island protectorates of Wallis and Futuna were subordinated to him
  - once Charles de Gaulle named someone else as high commissioner for the French Territory of the Pacific and the Far East, January 1941 – 1945: Georges Thierry d'Argenlieu (b. 1889 – d. 1964), while in December 1941 the Vichy (pro-German) government named Jean Decoux (b. 1884 – d. 1963) to the post (who in fact was only responsible for Wallis and Futuna, which was the only Pacific territory not to have rallied to the Free French at that time).
- In Atlantic waters, from 14 September 1939 until September 1943, four French possessions in the Americas (French Guiana, Guadeloupe and Martinique, all in the Caribbean, as well as Saint-Pierre and Miquelon, off the Canadian coast) were temporarily grouped together (from June 1940 under Vichy France, so remaining on the Allied side). The two consecutive 'high commissioners in the Antilles' (quite a misleading title: French Guiana is in continental South America, Saint Pierre and Miquelon off the Canadian coast, so in North America) held both administrative authority over the local governors and equivalent officers (rather like a gouverneur général did elsewhere on a permanent basis) and military command in the 'Theater Atlantic West':
  - 14 September 1939 – 14 July 1943 Georges Robert (b. 1875 – d. 1965)
  - 14 July 1943 – September 1943 Henri Hoppenot (b. 1891 – d. 1977)

In the later period of decolonisation, the office of high commissioner in a colony to become an allied nation was intended to become remarkably analogous to the Commonwealth's 'close relationship diplomats' in President General De Gaulle's project for a French Union to match the Commonwealth, but it soon started to fall apart, so they actually just presided over most of the peaceful decolonisation.

- Algérie (Algeria), once similar to Tunis, but incorporated directly into the French Republic, got its only high commissioner on 19 March 1962 – Christian Fouchet (b. 1911 – d. 1974) – until its 3 July 1962 independence from France (Algerian State; 25 September 1962 People's Democratic Algerian Republic ruled by the FLN, the former armed revolt)
- in present-day Benin, since 13 October 1946 Dahomey overseas territory, on 4 December 1958 granted autonomy as Republic of Dahomey, the last (acting) governor, René Tirant (b. 1907), stayed on as only high commissioner until the 1 August 1960 independence
- Chad, since 27 October 1946 an overseas territory of France (part of AEF colony) under its own governor, shortly after it was on 28 November 1958 granted autonomy as Republic of Chad, had a single high commissioner from 22 January 1959: Daniel Marius Doustin (b. 1920) until its 11 August 1960 independence from France.
- Congo-Brazzaville (variously named, often Middle Congo) had a single high commissioner, a bit after it was granted on 28 November 1958 autonomy (as Republic of Congo), 7 January 1959 – 15 August 1960: Guy Noël Georgy (b. 1918 – d. 2003) after many lieutenant governors since 11 December 1888 (under the governor-general of AEF, except the several cases when he governed the French Congo personally); afterwards it was an independent republic
- Côte d'Ivoire (Ivory Coast) had two high commissioners since it was granted autonomy as republic of Ivory Coast:
  - 4 December 1958 – 15 July 1960 Ernest de Nattes (b. 1908), the last of the long list of governors since 10 March 1893 (colony until 27 October 1946, then overseas territory)
  - 15 July 1960 – 7 August 1960 Yves René Henri Guéna (b. 1922); thereafter it was an independent republic
- Gabon had two high commissioners since on 28 November 1958 autonomy was granted (as Gabonese Republic) to the former overseas territory (since 1946)
  - November 1958 – July 1959 Louis Marius Pascal Sanmarco (b. 1912 – d. 2015), also the last of the governors since 1941 (after various otherwise styled chief executives before; it had since 15 January 1910 been part of French Equatorial Africa, AEF)
  - July 1959 – 17 August 1960 Jean Risterucci (b. 1911 – d. 1982); thereafter it was an independent republic
- Mauritania had two high commissioners, after having been a protectorate since 12 May 1903 (under a single military commandant), from 18 October 1904 the French civil territory of Mauritania under a commissioner (part of French West Africa (AOF); under its governor-general in Dakar, Senegal), and since 12 January 1920 a French colony under a lieutenant governor (many incumbents, again under Dakar), on 28 November 1958 obtaining autonomy (as Islamic Republic of Mauritania):
  - 5 October 1958 – February 1959 Henri Joseph Marie Bernard (b. 1920)
  - February 1959 – 28 November 1960 Amédée Joseph Émile Jean Pierre Anthonioz (b. 1913 – d. 1996); since independence from France it had its own president (or a junta chief);
- In Niger, since 13 October 1946 an overseas territory of France (part of French West Africa, see Senegal) under a lieutenant-governor, on 19 December 1958 granted autonomy as Republic of Niger, there was a single high commissioner 25 August 1958 – 10 November 1960: Jean Colombani (b. 1903), i.e. still several months after the formal 3 August 1960 independence whilst there was no president
- In Senegal, since 27 October 1946 an overseas territory of France, which on 25 November 1958 had obtained autonomy (as Republic of Senegal), the last governor stayed on as first (and only?) Haut commissaire 25 November 1958 – 20 June 1960: Pierre Auguste Michel Marie Lami (b. 1909); meanwhile on 4 April 1959 the Sudanese Republic (now Mali) and Senegal formed the Mali Federation and his term ended at the 20 June 1960 independence of that Mali Federation from France (on 20 August 1960 the Republic of Senegal withdrew from the thus dissolved Mali Federation).
- in French Sudan, an overseas territory of France since 27 October 1946 (earlier a colony; stayed within French West Africa), which on 24 November 1958 obtained autonomy (as Sudanese Republic), there were two high commissioners:
  - 3 November 1956 – 24 November 1958 Henri Victor Gipoulon
  - 24 November 1958 – 20 June 1960 Jean Charles Sicurani (b. 1915 – d. 1977); during his term on 4 April 1959 this Sudanese Republic and Senegal (cfr. above) united to form the Mali Federation; his office ceased at the 20 June 1960 independence of the Mali Federation from France
- In the Republic of Upper Volta (since 4 January 1947 a French territory; present-day Burkina Faso, renamed 4 August 1984), since the 11 December 1958 grant of Autonomy as a 'republic', République de Haute-Volta, there were two high commissioners:
  - 11 December 1958 – February 1959 Max Berthet, who stayed on, having been the last (acting) governor
  - February 1959 – 5 August 1960 Paul Jean Marie Masson (b. 1920), until the Independence from France as the Republic of Upper Volta.

While the colonies above were generally artificially carved creations, Haut commissaires also were appointed by Paris to prepare the (de facto) independence of pre-existing monarchies that had formally been French protectorates, such as:

- Tunisia, known as the Régence (since 3 June 1955 autonomous), where France had a Resident-general (posted with the beys of Tunis, who once the French protectorate was terminated on 20 March 1956 restyled his realm al-Mamlaka at-Tunisiyya 'Tunisian Kingdom'), instead got a high commissioner from 13 September 1955 to 20 March 1956: Roger Seydoux Fornier de Clausonne (b. 1908 – d. 1985); in continued shortly as independent monarchy, but on 25 July 1957 became the Tunisian Republic.

Yet a colony could achieve independence without a high commissioner, e.g. Guinée (French Guinea).

In one case a French Haut Commissaire was the exact match and colleague of a British high commissioner: they represented both powers in the south sea condominium (i.e. territory under joint sovereignty) of the New Hebrides, which became the present-day republic of Vanuatu. The current high commissioner of Vanuatu to the US [5 February 2009] is David J. Wilson (born 1956).

A very special category was the Haut Commissaire as 'liquidator' of a gouvernement-général (the colonial echelon grouping several neighbouring colonies under a governor-general), notably:

- in Afrique Equatoriale Française (French Equatorial Africa, AEF), three high commissioners:
  - 4 April 1957 – 29 January 1958 Paul Louis Gabriel Chauvet (b. 1904), also the last of the long list of governors-general since 28 June 1908 (before it had five Commissioners-general since 27 April 1886)
  - 29 January 1958 – 15 July 1958 Pierre Messmer (b. 1916)
  - 15 July 1958 – 15 August 1960 Yvon Bourges (b. 1921)
- in Afrique Occidentale Française (AOF), i.e. French West Africa, the last of a long list of governors-general since 1895 stayed on as first of only two high commissioners:
  - 4 April 1957 – July 1958 Gaston Custin (b. 1903 – d. 1993)
  - July 1958 – 22 December 1958 Pierre Messmer (b. 1916)

Another use for the title was found in the rare remaining insulara (formerly no longer colonial) overseas possessions, in these cases still functioning:

- In French Polynesia it is the title of the representative of the French republic in the overseas territory (restyled 'overseas collectivity' in 2003, 'overseas country' on 27 February 2004) since 13 July 1977 (until 14 September 1984 he also presided the local council of ministers, that got its own president, as the legislature already had)
- In New Caledonia (Nouvelle Calédonie in French, colonised in 1853; its governors had been high commissioners in the Pacific Ocean from 22 March 1907, see above) the title (commonly corrupted to Haussaire) was chosen for the chief executive on 19 December 1981, when it was an overseas territory (since 1946), even before autonomy was granted on 18 November 1984, and maintained after its status was changed on 20 July 1998 to the unique French collectivité sui generis; he represents the Paris government, while there are a native legislature and government.

==== Greece ====
In early May 1919, the Kingdom of Greece was given a mandate by the Supreme Allied War Council for the city of Smyrna (today İzmir) and its hinterland, which it proceeded to occupy on 12 May. A civilian administration was set up in the "Smyrna Zone", headed, from 21 May 1919 until 9 September 1922, when Greece lost Smyrna to Turkey, by the high commissioner (Greek: Ὕπατος Ἁρμοστὴς) Aristeidis Stergiadis (1861–1950).

==== Italian ====
- while only various military commanders and since 1916 a Secretary for Civil Affairs in Albania (Ugo Capialbi) had acted for Rome since Italy invaded on 27 December 1914 (occupying Vlorë and parts of Southern Albania; on 3 June 1917 Albanian independence under an Italian protectorate was declared by Italy, opposed by most Albanians; adding in November 1918 the former Austro-Hungarian occupied areas to the Italian zone), only since in 1919 was an Albanian provisional government recognised by Italy as the legal government of the protected zone, consecutive high commissioners for the Crown were appointed until Italy effectively withdrew its troops on 3 September 1920 (as agreed on 22 August 1920 when Italy formally recognised the total independence of Albania):
  - 1919–1920 ....
  - 1920 Fortunato Castoldi
  - 1920 – 3 September 1920 Gaetano Conti Manzoni
- two incumbents appointed by the kingdom in Fiume (a former Austrian province; now Rijeka in Croatia), after an extraordinary commissionary, on 31 December 1920 declared, short-lived "Independent State of Fiume", until the accession of its first president
  - 13 June 1921 – 1921 Antonio Foschini (b. 1872 – d. 19..)
  - 1921 – 5 October 1921 Luigi Amantea (b. 1869 – d. 19..)
- in Slovenia, which after 6–17 April 1941 Italian-German occupation, was on 17 April 1941 partitioned between Italy, Hungary and Germany, the Italian portion was named province of Lubiana, from 3 May 1941 under a Civil Commissioner, from 3 May 1941 restyled the first of two high commissioners:
  - 18 April 1941 – 1942 Emilio Grazioli (b. 1869 – d. 1951)
  - 1942–1943 Giuseppe Lombrassa (b. 1906 – d. 1966)
- High Commissioner in Italian East Africa (1935 - 1936)
- High Commissioner for the Sicily (1944 - 1946)
- High Commissioner for the Sardinia (1944-1949)

==== Portuguese ====
The title Alto Comissário da República (High Commissioner of the Republic) or, simply Alto Comissário, was given to some Portuguese colonial governors to whom were given exceptional, enlarged executive and legislative powers, superior to those of common governors. In the Monarchy, before 1910, they were known as Comissários Régios (Royal Commissioners). Altos Comissários (or Comissários Régios when indicated) had been nominated for:

- Angola:
  - Guilherme Augusto de Brito Capelo (Comissário Régio) – 1896–1897
  - José Mendes Ribeiro de Norton de Matos – 1921–1923
  - Francisco da Cunha Rego Chaves – 1925–1926
  - António Vicente Ferreira – 1926–1928
  - Filomeno da Câmara Melo Cabral – 1929–1930
- Cabo Verde (Cape Verde):
  - Vicente Almeida d'Eça – 30 December 1974 – 5 July 1975
- Portuguese India:
  - João António de Brissac das Neves Ferreira (Comissário Régio) – 1896–1897
- Mozambique:
  - António Enes (Comissário Régio) – 1895
  - José Francisco de Azevedo e Silva – 1911–1912
  - Manuel de Brito Camacho – 1921–1923
  - Vitor Hugo de Azevedo Coutinho – 1924–1926
- São Tomé and Príncipe:
  - António Elísio Capelo Pires Veloso – 18 December 1974 (three days before the formal granting of autonomy), actually the last of many governors (since 1753, before both islands were separate), staying on until it became an independent republic on 12 July 1975
- Portuguese Timor:
  - José Joaquim Lopes de Lima (Comissário Régio) – 1851–1852

==== Spanish ====
Alto comisario was the Spanish title of the official exercing the functions of a governor in the following colonial possessions:

- Equatorial Guinea had three consecutive high commissioners:
  - 15 December 1963 – 1964 Francisco Núñez Rodríguez (b. 1902 – d. 1972), also the last of many governors since 7 June 1494
  - 1964–1966 Pedro Latorre Alcubierre
  - 1966 – 12 October 1968 Víctor Suances Díaz del Río; his term ended when it became an independent republic

The title Alto Comisario was also used for the representative of Spain in its protectorate zone within the Sherifan sultanate of Morocco (most of the country was under French protectorate), known as el Jalifato after the Khalifa (Spanish: Jalifa), the Sultan's fully mandated, princely Viceroy in this protectorate, to which the high commissioner was formally accredited, but whose senior he was in reality. In 1934–1956 the governors of the Western Sahara (which from 27 November 1912 were also governors-general of Spanish West Africa) were subordinated to him. The office was filled by the governors of Spanish West Africa from 1939 to 1956.

==== United States ====
- While being a U.S. protectorate from 1905 to 1941, the Dominican Republic had first various native regimes, then U.S. military governors 29 November 1916 – 24 July 1922, and just before it again had the first of its own presidents on 21 October 1922, a single U.S. high commissioner, Sumner Welles, who served from 1922 to 1924.
- Haiti, the other (western) half of the island of Hispaniola, had a similar experience. It was a U.S. protectorate from 1915 to 1936, after five U.S. military commanders, there was one high commissioner, John H. Russell, Jr., who served from 11 February 1922 to 16 November 1930.
- Following World War I, Rear Admiral Mark Lambert Bristol served as United States high commissioner for Turkey from 1919 to 1927.
- The Philippines became a United States unincorporated territory on 13 August 1898. After gaining autonomy on 15 November 1935, it had the following high commissioners:
  - 1935–1937 William Francis "Frank" Murphy, who was also the last governor-general over the Islands.
  - 1937–1939 Paul V. McNutt (first commission)
  - 1939 – 7 September 1942 Francis Bowes Sayers (exiled in the U.S. from 24 December 1942 during the Japanese Occupation).
  - 7 September 1942 – 4 July 1946 Paul V. McNutt (second commission; exiled in the U.S. until August 1945 during the Japanese Occupation). Term ended when the Philippines achieved full sovereignty.
- Okinawa and Ryukyu Islands (Japanese archipelago), and later just Okinawa had six U.S. high commissioners (ja):
  - 4 July 1957 – 1 May 1958 James Edward Moore. Moore was also the last Deputy governor and Commanding General, Ryukyu Islands Command.
  - 1 May 1958 – 12 February 1961 Donald Prentice Booth.
  - 16 February 1961 – 31 July 1964 Paul Wyatt Caraway.
  - 1 August 1964 – 31 October 1966 Albert Watson II.
  - 2 November 1966 – 28 January 1968 Ferdinand Thomas Unger.
  - 28 January 1968 – 15 May 1972 James Benjamin Lampert. On 15 May 1972, pursuant to the 1971 Okinawa Reversion Agreement, Okinawa reverted to Japanese sovereignty as a prefecture; therefore, the office of U.S. high commissioner on Okinawa ceased to exist.

=== Temporary administration of acquired territories ===
In many cases, a political vacuum created by war, occupation or other events discontinuing a country's constitutional government has been filled by those able to do so, one nation or often an alliance, installing a transitional (often minimal) governance administered by, or under supervision of, one or more high commissioners representing it/them.

Examples of multilaterally appointed administrations are discussed further below. Examples of administrations appointed during decolonisation processes are described above. Examples of non-colonial transitional administrations titled "High Commissioners" are:

- 22 November 1918 – 1919 Alsace-Lorraine, until then part of the defeated German Empire as Elsaß-Lothringen but just occupied by and restored to France, was under haut commissaire Maringer (it would be only fully reintegrated in 1925, after three Commissioners General)
- When Mussolini's Italy occupied Montenegro 17 April 1941 – 10 September 1943, it first appointed a (nominal) governor (17 May 1941 – 23 July 1941? Mihajlo Ivanovic), then a civil commissioner 29 April 1941 – 22 May 1941 Conte Serafino Mazzolini (b. 1890 – d. 1945), who next stayed on as high commissioner (from 12 July 1941, also styled Regent at the proclamation of nominal independence under Italian control, but exiled King Mihajlo I refused the throne, when offered the Montenegrin crown; Prince Roman Petrovich of Russia (b. 1896 – d. 1978) also refused to be enthroned) until 23 July 1941 followed by two governors before the German occupation

== Domestic high commissioners ==
- In France, a high commissioner, in French haut-commissaire, is a civil servant appointed by the President of France to some high-level position within France:
  - The high commissioner for atomic energy is the head of the CEA
  - cfr. Haute Autorité.
- In Portugal, high commissioner (alto comissário in Portuguese) is the title of certain officials appointed by the President, the Parliament or the Government to deal with special matters of national importance (e.g.: the High Commissioner for Immigration and Intercultural Dialogue is the government official responsible for the immigration and ethnic minorities affairs).

== Multilaterally mandated ==
=== Representing an international alliance ===
==== Crete ====
After the naval blockade of Crete in 1898 by France, Italy, Russia and the United Kingdom, Crete became an autonomous state within the Ottoman Empire. These protecting powers appointed the following as High Commissioner (Greek: Ὕπατος Ἁρμοστὴς) until 1908, when the Cretan Assembly unilaterally declared union with Greece (with Crete subsequently formally becoming part of Greece in 1913, after the Balkan Wars):

- 1898–1906 Prince George of Greece
- 18 September 1906 – 24 September 1908 Alexandros Zaimis

==== Constantinople ====
Following the capitulation of the Ottoman Empire in the Armistice of Mudros, on 8 December 1918 the Allies occupied the shores of the Bosporus, the Dardanelles, the eastern coast of the Sea of Marmara up to 15 km deep, and the islands of Imbros, Lemnos, Samothrace and Tenedos. The entire area demilitarised (Zone of the Straits). This was complemented from 16 March to 10 August 1920 as the Allies occupied the Ottoman capital Constantinople (Istanbul). Until the termination of Allied occupation on 22 October 1923, there were at all times one Allied High Commissioner from each of the occupying powers (incumbents from the United Kingdom France, Italy, Greece and later the United States and Japan).

==== Post–World War II ====
Often the main/locally concerned members of an alliance would not set up a joint occupation authority (as in Italy after the Nazi defeat) but simply each appoint one for each of the zones into which they physically divided amongst themselves an occupied state or territory, e.g. after World War II:

- In Austria, until 27 July 1955 when Allied occupation ended, restoring Austrian sovereignty, it was administered as a British Zone (six consecutive high commissioners, July 1945), a US Zone (four incumbents from 5 July 1945), a Soviet Zone (four from July 1945; only this had first been under a military governor from 8 April 1945), and a French Zone (two, from 8 July 1945);
- In Germany there were also four major occupation zones: the British Zone (after three consecutive military governors from 22 May 1945, the last stayed on as first of three consecutive high commissioners 21 September 1949 – 5 May 1955), the US Zone (after five military governors from 8 May 1945, four high commissioners 2 September 1949 – 5 May 1955), the Soviet Zone (after a military commander April 1945 – 9 June 1945 who stayed as first of three military governors 9 June 1945 – 10 October 1949, the last of whom stayed on as only chairman of the Soviet Control Commission 10 October 1949 – 28 May 1953, two high commissioners 28 May 1953 – 20 September 1955), and the French Zone (after a military commander from May 1945 and a Military governor from July 1945, a single high commissioner 21 September 1949 – 5 May 1955); the Nazi capital, Berlin, enclaved in the Soviet zone, was separately quartered under four military city commanders; only the small Dutch zone by the border with the Netherlands was destined for annexation in 1949, so it was divided up in two districts, each under a landdrost (Tudderen, attached to the province of (Dutch) Limburg and Elten, attached to Gelderland province), but returned to Germany after compensation payments and minor border corrections on 11 August 1963.

=== Representing an international organisation ===
As the 'world community' became a widely accepted ideal in diplomacy and was embodied first in the League of Nations and later the United Nations, these often came to play a key role in extraordinary situations that would earlier probably have been dealt with by states as above, sometimes reflected in the appointment of high commissioners under their auspices, sometimes just from the same leading powers, sometimes rather from 'neutral' member states.

The title of High Commissioner was specifically used for the administrators during the 'emancipation from colonial rule' of League of Nations mandates and United Nations Trust Territories, i.e. non-sovereign states under a 'transitional' regime established under the authority of the League of Nations or the UN, respectively, to prepare them for full independence.

These 'guardianships' most often were simply awarded to the former colonial power or if that was a loser in the preceding World War, to the 'liberating' Allied victor(s). The trust territories have all now attained self-government or independence, either as separate nations or by joining neighbouring independent countries.

==== League of Nations ====
- Fridtjof Nansen

===== Mandate territories =====
- The Mandatory Iraq high commissioners – After Ottoman Iraq was conquered by British forces, the mandate territory had four incumbents, after a single civilian Administrator (10 January 1919 – 1 October 1920 Sir Arnold Talbot Wilson), continuing ten years after the accession to the throne and most of the rule of the country's first Malik (King, reigned 23 August 1921 – 8 September 1933) Faysal I (b. 1885 – d. 1933) :
  - 1 October 1920 – 4 May 1923 Sir Percy Zachariah Cox (b. 1864 – d. 1937)
  - 4 May 1923 – October 1928 Sir Henry Robert Conway Dobbs (acting to 15 September 1923) (b. 1871 – d. 1934)
  - October 1928 – 11 September 1929 Sir Gilbert Falkingham Clayton (b. 1875 – d. 1929)
  - 3 October 1929 – 3 October 1932 Sir Francis Henry Humphrys (b. 1879 – d. 1971)
- The Mandatory Palestine high commissioners
  - 1 July 1920 – 1925 Sir Herbert Louis Samuel (1879–1963), until the 1922 establishment of the mandate actually the first civilian who took over, already as High Commissioner, from the three consecutive military administrators since the 1917 conquest by British forces
  - 1925 Sir Gilbert Falkingham Clayton (acting) (1875–1929)
  - 25 August 1925 – August 1928 Herbert Charles Onslow Plumer, Baron Plumer (1857–1932)
  - August 1928 – 6 December 1928 Sir Harry Charles Luke (acting) (1884–1969)
  - 6 December 1928 – 1931 Sir John Robert Chancellor (1870–1952)
  - 1931–1932 Mark Aitchison Young (acting) (1886–1974)
  - 1932 – September 1937 Sir Arthur Grenfell Wauchope (1874–1947)
  - September 1937 – March 1938 William Denis Battershill (acting) (1896–1959)
  - 3 March 1938 – 3 September 1944 Sir Harold Alfred MacMichael (1882–1969)
  - 3 September 1944 – 21 November 1945 John Standish Surtees Prendergast Vereker, Viscount Gort (1886–1946)
  - 21 November 1945 – 14 May 1948 Sir Alan Gordon Cunningham (1887–1983)

==== United Nations ====
===== UN Trust Territories =====
- In Togo, once a German colony, then a League of Nations mandate, * three high commissioners
  - 21 September 1956 – 23 March 1957 Jean Louis Philippe Bérard (b. 1910), in fact the last of many commissioners since 4 September 1916
  - 23 March 1957 – June 1957 Joseph Édouard Georges Rigal (acting)
  - June 1957 – 27 April 1960 Georges Léon Spénale (b. 1913 – d. 1983); next it was an independent republic.
- The UN Trust Territory of the Pacific Islands (originally comprising Marshall Islands, Micronesia, Northern Mariana Islands and Palau), after Allied military occupations, since 18 July 1947, had a dozen high commissioners, also presiding over the splitting off of Palau and Marshall Islands in 1980 and the 10 May 1979 granting of autonomy to the Federated States of Micronesia (former Ponape, Truk and Yap districts of the Trust Territory) until on 3 November 1986 the Trust Territory was dissolved by the US (a single Director of the Office of Transition, Charles Jordan, stepped in from 3 November 1986 – 30 September 1991, a while after the 22 December 1990 proclamation of final independence as the UN Security Council ratified the termination of US trusteeship).

===== Other UN administration =====
- After the former Italian colony of Eritrea had been under victor Britain's administration since 5 May 1941, a specific United Nations administration, under Britain, was installed on 19 February 1951, under a UN high commissioner, Edoardo Anze Matienzo (Bolivian, b. 1902), whose office ceased on 15 September 1952 when it was federated with Ethiopia under the sovereignty of the Ethiopian emperor.

===== Representing the world universally =====
At the United Nations and affiliated global organisations, a high commissioner serves as the permanent chief executive of a commission composed of representatives of various member nations.

- the UN High Commissioner for Human Rights, who has the rank of under-secretary-general, serves the United Nations Human Rights Commission. In fact in 2005, the US ambassador at the UN complained that the incumbent, as a 'civil servant', was not authorised to act upon information (in this case worldwide press reports on abnormal detention forms in the 'war against terrorism' suspected to breach the rights of the suspects) not obtained by the organisation's official channels.
- the UN High Commissioner for Refugees heads the Office of the United Nations High Commissioner for Refugees (UNHCR)

==== Organization for Security and Co-operation in Europe ====
- High Commissioner on National Minorities

== See also ==
- Lord High Commissioner (disambiguation)
- High Representative
