= Coltano =

- Frazione
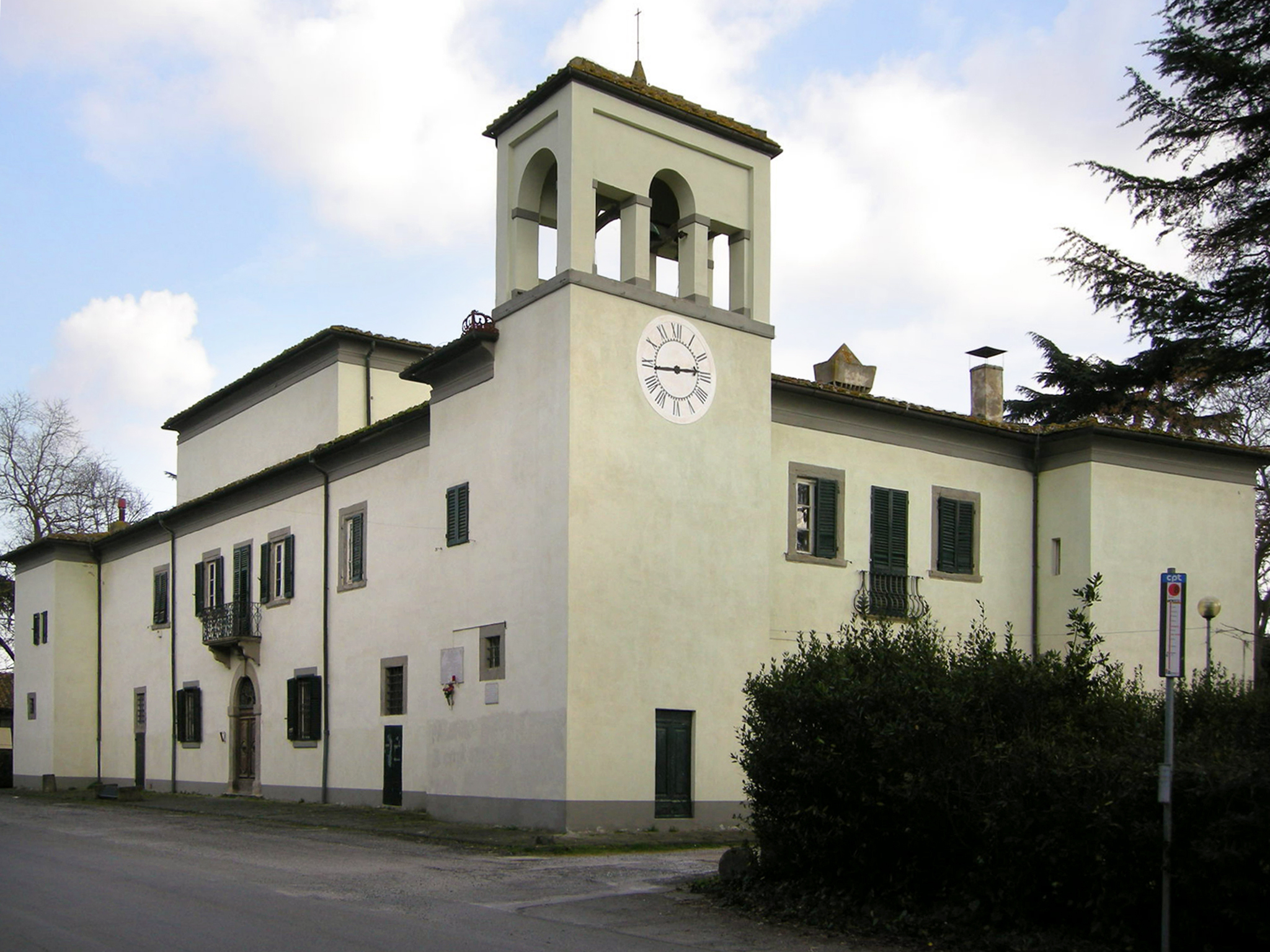
- Villa Medicea in Coltano

- Location of Coltano in Italy
- Coordinates: 43°38′18″N 10°23′33″E
- Country: Italy
- Region: Tuscany
- Province: Pisa (PI)
- Comune: Pisa
- Elevation: 2 m (6.6 ft)

Population (2011)
  - Total: 45
- Time zone: UTC+1 (CET)
  - Summer (DST): UTC+2 (CEST)
- Postal code: 56121
- Dialing code: (+39) 050

Coltano is a village in Tuscany, central Italy, administratively a frazione of the comune of Pisa, province of Pisa. At the time of the 2001 census its population was 125.

Coltano is about 12 km from the city of Pisa.

Coltano was also the place of the first Marconi wireless intercontinental station of Italy officially opened in the 1911.

== Bibliografia ==
- Caciagli, Giuseppe (1972). Pisa e la sua provincia. Vol. 3. Pisa: Colombo Cursi Editore. pp. 282–285.
