= Ženik =

- Location in Slovenia
- Coordinates: 46°33′29.61″N 16°0′30.01″E
- Country: Slovenia
- Traditional region: Styria
- Statistical region: Mura
- Municipality: Sveti Jurij ob Ščavnici

Area
  - Total: 0.84 km^{2} (0.32 sq mi)
- Elevation: 265.8 m (872 ft)

Population (2002)
  - Total: 99

Ženik (pronounced [ˈʒeːnik]) is a settlement in the Municipality of Sveti Jurij ob Ščavnici in northeastern Slovenia. It lies along the road from Stara Gora towards Brezje and Sovjak in the hills just south of Sveti Jurij ob Ščavnici. The area is part of the traditional region of Styria and is now included in the Mura Statistical Region.
