= Kočki Vrh =

- Location in Slovenia
- Coordinates: 46°33′35.4″N 15°58′5.96″E
- Country: Slovenia
- Traditional region: Styria
- Statistical region: Mura
- Municipality: Sveti Jurij ob Ščavnici

Area
  - Total: 0.44 km^{2} (0.17 sq mi)
- Elevation: 303.4 m (995 ft)

Population (2002)
  - Total: 27

Kočki Vrh (pronounced [ˈkoːtʃki ˈʋəɾx]) is a small settlement in the Municipality of Sveti Jurij ob Ščavnici in northeastern Slovenia. The area is part of the traditional region of Styria and is now included in the Mura Statistical Region.

== Geography ==
Kočki Vrh lies in the Slovene Hills east of Sveti Jurij ob Ščavnici. It is a scattered settlement on a ridge between the Ščavnica and Pesnica valleys. It is bordered by Peščeni Vrh to the west, by Kraljevci to the north and east, and by Župetinci and Andrenci to the south. There are fields and orchards along the ridge and on the upper part of the slopes.

== History ==
Before the vineyards were destroyed by downy mildew caused by Plasmopara viticola in the 19th century, the farmers from the neighboring villages cultivated grapes in Kočki Vrh. In the late 20th century, many of the houses were still wooden with thatched roofs. The traditional rye thatching was replaced by lower-quality wheat thatching because of poor rye yields.
