= Žihlava =

- Location in Slovenia
- Coordinates: 46°33′12.47″N 16°2′51.48″E
- Country: Slovenia
- Traditional region: Styria
- Statistical region: Mura
- Municipality: Sveti Jurij ob Ščavnici

Area
  - Total: 1.78 km^{2} (0.69 sq mi)
- Elevation: 194 m (636 ft)

Population (2002)
  - Total: 78

Žihlava (pronounced [ˈʒiːxlaʋa]) is a settlement in the Municipality of Sveti Jurij ob Ščavnici in northeastern Slovenia. It lies in the Ščavnica Valley in the area known as Prlekija. It is part of the traditional region of Styria and is now included in the Mura Statistical Region.
