= List of people from Maribor =

List of notable individuals who were born or lived in Maribor:

- Tomaž Barada, taekwondo athlete
- Walter Wolf, tycoon, businessman person
- Sani Bečirovič, basketball player
- Bernhard von Spanheim, founder of the city
- Fredi Bobic, German-Slovene association football player
- Urška Bračko, 2014 Miss Universe Slovenia
- Brigita Brezovac, IFBB professional bodybuilder
- Aleš Čeh, football player
- Mladen Dolar, philosopher
- Filip Flisar, ski cross champion
- Vekoslav Grmič, Roman Catholic bishop and theologian
- Herta Haas, Yugoslav Partisan and second wife of Josip Broz Tito
- Polona Hercog, tennis player
- Israel Isserlin, Medieval rabbi
- Jure Ivanušič, actor and musician
- Archduke Johann of Austria, Habsburg nobleman and philanthropist
- Drago Jančar, author
- Ludmila Janovská, Czech painter; as a girl she lived for several years in Maribor, where her parents, both painters, were members of the Grohar art club
- Mima Jaušovec, female tennis player
- Kevin Kampl, football player
- Janko Kastelic, conductor and music director
- Matjaž Kek, association football player and manager
- Maja Keuc, singer who represented Slovenia in the Eurovision Song Contest 2011
- Aleksander Knavs, football player
- Edvard Kocbek, poet, essayist, and politician
- Jana Kolarič (born 1954), author and translator.
- Katja Koren, alpine skier
- Anton Korošec, politician
- Luka Krajnc, football player
- Bratko Kreft, author
- Rene Krhin, football player
- Marko Letonja, conductor
- Rudolf Maister, military leader
- Janez Menart, poet and translator
- Špelca Mladič, painter, teacher and designer; she lived and worked in Maribor for more than a decade
- Jan Muršak, second ever Slovenian NHL hockey player
- Tomaž Pandur, stage director
- Tone Partljič, playwright, screenwriter, politician
- Matjaž Perc, physicist
- Žiga Pešut, professional ice hockey player
- Žarko Petan, writer, essayist, theatre and film director
- Janko Pleterski, historian
- Herman Potočnik, rocket engineer and pioneer of astronautics
- Zoran Predin, singer
- Ladislaus von Rabcewicz, Austrian civil engineer
- Anton Martin Slomšek, Roman Catholic bishop, author, poet, and advocate of Slovene culture
- Ilka Štuhec, alpine skiing champion
- Leon Štukelj, Olympic champion
- Luka Šulić, cellist, member of the 2Cellos duo
- Marcos Tavares, football player
- Wilhelm von Tegetthoff, Austrian admiral
- Jurij Toplak, constitutional scholar, election law expert
- Ludvik Toplak, lawyer, university rector, ambassador
- Anton Trstenjak, theologian, psychologist, essayist
- Danilo Türk, former president of Slovenia
- Slavko Vinčić, FIFA football referee
- Prežihov Voranc, writer and political activist
- Sasha Vujačić, basketball player
- Zlatko Zahovič, association football player
- Vito Žuraj, composer
