= Stanetinci, Sveti Jurij ob Ščavnici =

Stanetinci
- Location in Slovenia
- Coordinates: 46°35′22.76″N 16°3′17.48″E
- Country: Slovenia
- Traditional region: Styria
- Statistical region: Mura
- Municipality: Sveti Jurij ob Ščavnici

Area
  - Total: 2.68 km^{2} (1.03 sq mi)
- Elevation: 224 m (735 ft)

Population (2002)
  - Total: 95

Stanetinci (pronounced [ˈstaːnɛtintsi]) is a settlement in the Municipality of Sveti Jurij ob Ščavnici in northeastern Slovenia. It lies in the Slovene Hills above the Ščavnica Valley. The area is part of the traditional region of Styria and is now included in the Mura Statistical Region.
