= Slaptinci =

- Location in Slovenia
- Coordinates: 46°33′55.27″N 16°2′46.2″E
- Country: Slovenia
- Traditional region: Styria
- Statistical region: Mura
- Municipality: Sveti Jurij ob Ščavnici

Area
  - Total: 3.62 km^{2} (1.40 sq mi)
- Elevation: 205.2 m (673 ft)

Population (2002)
  - Total: 139

Slaptinci (pronounced [ˈslaːptintsi]) is a settlement in the Ščavnica Valley in the Municipality of Sveti Jurij ob Ščavnici in northeastern Slovenia. The area is part of the traditional region of Styria and is now included in the Mura Statistical Region.
