= Blaguš =

- Location in Slovenia
- Coordinates: 46°34′14.29″N 15°59′55.14″E
- Country: Slovenia
- Traditional region: Styria
- Statistical region: Mura
- Municipality: Sveti Jurij ob Ščavnici

Area
  - Total: 1.67 km^{2} (0.64 sq mi)
- Elevation: 234.5 m (769 ft)

Population (2002)
  - Total: 66

Blaguš (pronounced [blaˈɡuːʃ]) is a small settlement in the Municipality of Sveti Jurij ob Ščavnici in northeastern Slovenia. The area is part of the traditional region of Styria. It is now included with the rest of the municipality in the Mura Statistical Region.

A number of Roman-period burial mounds have been identified close to the settlement.
