= Bolehnečici =

- Location in Slovenia
- Coordinates: 46°33′3.29″N 16°3′38.25″E
- Country: Slovenia
- Traditional region: Styria
- Statistical region: Mura
- Municipality: Sveti Jurij ob Ščavnici

Area
  - Total: 3.58 km^{2} (1.38 sq mi)
- Elevation: 191.9 m (630 ft)

Population (2002)
  - Total: 135

Bolehnečici (pronounced [bɔlɛˈxneːtʃitsi], in older sources Bolehneci, German: Wollachnetzen) is a village in the Municipality of Sveti Jurij ob Ščavnici in northeastern Slovenia. The area is part of the traditional region of Styria and is now included in the Mura Statistical Region.

The small Neo-Gothic chapel in the centre of the village dates to the late 19th / early 20th century.
