= Grabšinci =

- Location in Slovenia
- Coordinates: 46°31′39.89″N 16°0′58.47″E
- Country: Slovenia
- Traditional region: Styria
- Statistical region: Mura
- Municipality: Sveti Jurij ob Ščavnici

Area
  - Total: 2.61 km^{2} (1.01 sq mi)
- Elevation: 281.8 m (925 ft)

Population (2002)
  - Total: 72

Grabšinci (pronounced [ˈɡɾaːpʃintsi]) is a settlement in the Slovene Hills in the Municipality of Sveti Jurij ob Ščavnici in northeastern Slovenia. The area is part of the traditional Styria region and is now included in the Mura Statistical Region.

The village chapel dates to the second half of the 19th century.
