= Uniše =

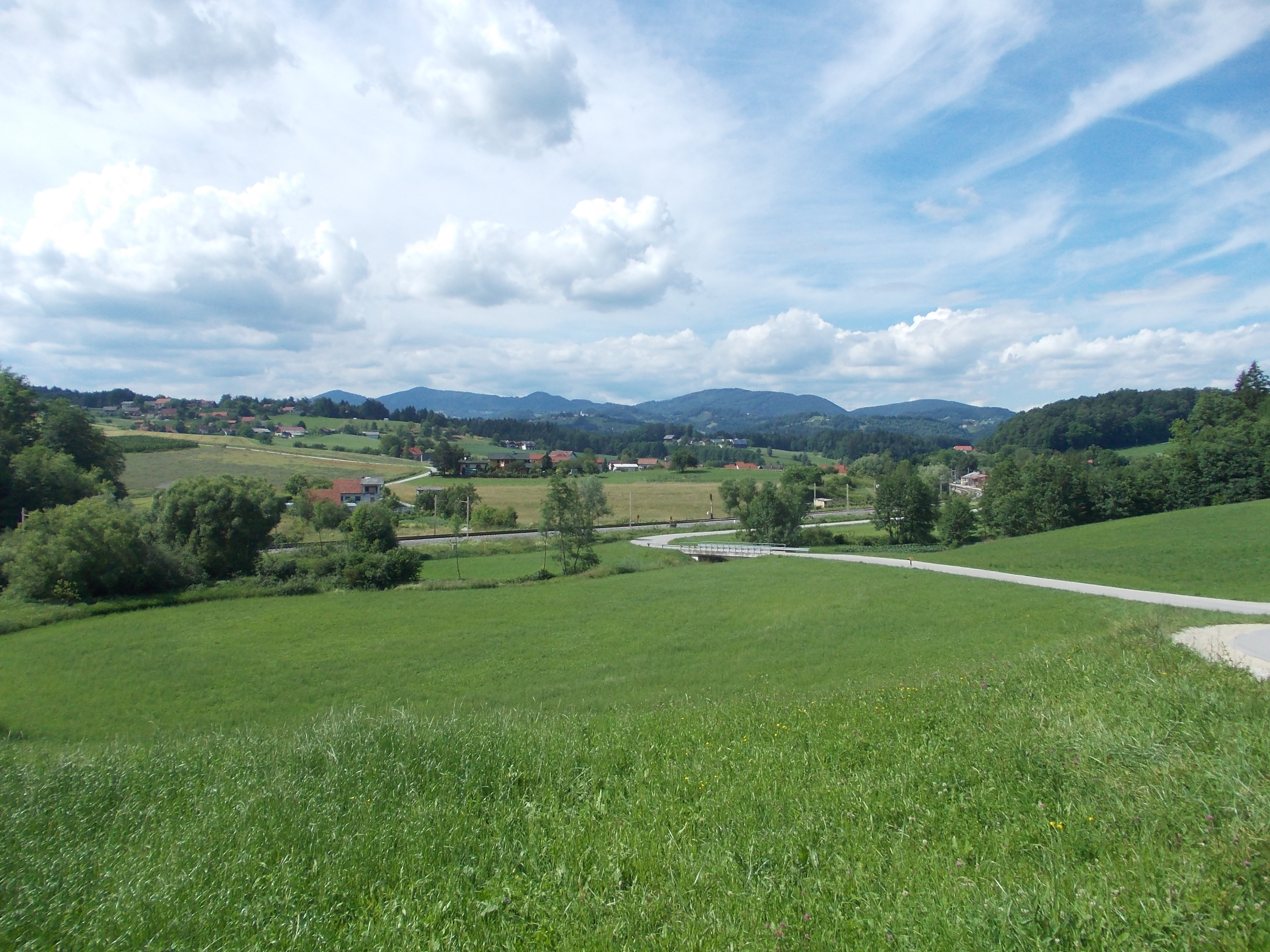

- Location in Slovenia
- Coordinates: 46°14′37.02″N 15°26′13.73″E
- Country: Slovenia
- Traditional region: Styria
- Statistical region: Savinja
- Municipality: Šentjur

Area
  - Total: 1.35 km^{2} (0.52 sq mi)
- Elevation: 312.2 m (1,024 ft)

Population (2020)
  - Total: 38
  - Density: 28/km^{2} (73/sq mi)

Uniše (pronounced [uˈniːʃɛ], German: Unische) is a settlement in the Municipality of Šentjur, eastern Slovenia. The settlement, and the entire municipality, are included in the Savinja Statistical Region, which is in the Slovenian portion of the historical Duchy of Styria.

== Church ==
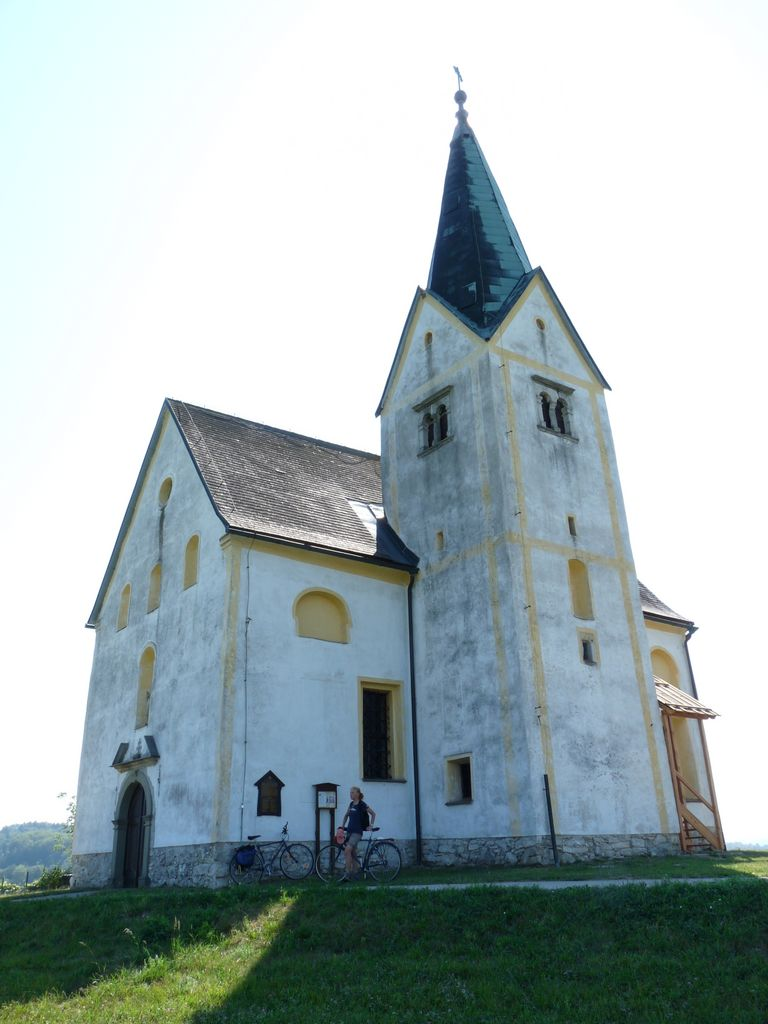
St. Oswald's Church

The local church is dedicated to Saint Oswald (Slovene: sveti Ožbolt) and belongs to the Parish of Ponikva. It was built between 1735 and 1736 on the site of a 16th-century building. It was remodelled in 1856.

== Slomšek House ==
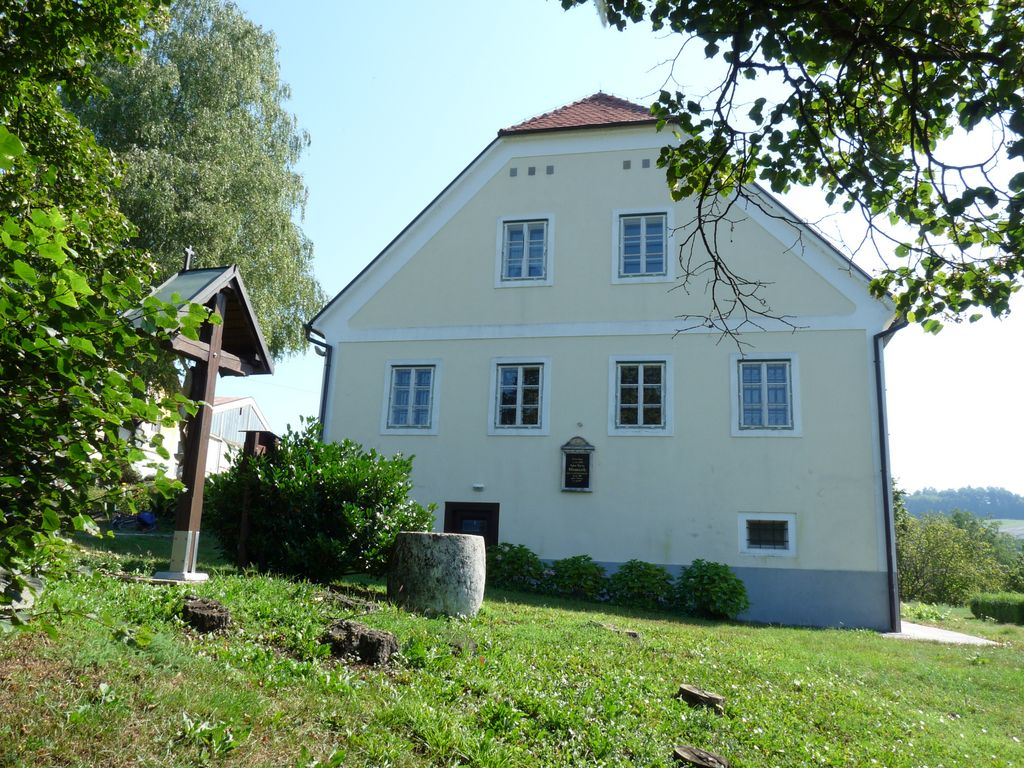
Slomšek House, birthplace of Anton Martin Slomšek

Bishop, author and poet, the blessed Anton Martin Slomšek, was born in the hamlet of Slom in the settlement in 1800. A memorial room is set up in the house where he was born. A memorial plaque was installed in 1877 on the wall at the initiative of the priest Davorin Trstenjak.
