= Prlekija =

Coordinates: 46°30′0″N 16°07′0″E

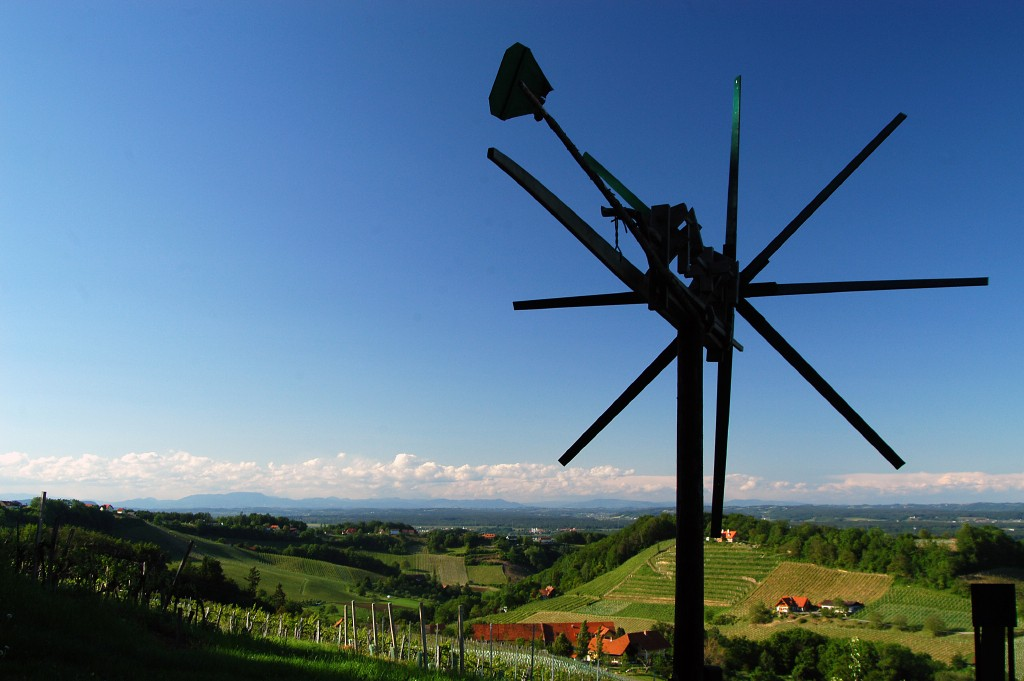
A typical klopotec

Prlekija is a region in northeastern Slovenia between the Drava and Mura rivers. It comprises the eastern part of the Slovene Hills (Slovene: Slovenske gorice), stretching from the border with Austria to the border with Croatia. It is part of the traditional province of Lower Styria. Together with the traditional province of Prekmurje, it forms part of the Mura Statistical Region. Its central and largest town is Ljutomer.

The region is known for its first-class wines, food, and the specific dialect of its inhabitants, which together with Prekmurje Slovene belongs to the Pannonian dialectal group of Slovene dialects, with which it is mutually intelligible. The symbol of the region is the klopotec, a wooden mechanical device on a high wooden pole, similar to a windmill, used to keep birds away from pecking at grapes in vineyards. Tünka is a protected food product from Prlekija. It is made of minced lard and pork. Prlekija is also known for other foods, such as prleška gibanica, dumplings and various sour cream soups and stews.

The region roughly comprises the municipalities of Križevci, Ljutomer, Radenci, Razkrižje, Sveti Jurij ob Ščavnici, Veržej, Gornja Radgona, Sveti Tomaž, Središče ob Dravi, and Ormož. However, the borders of the region are not fully defined.

== Notable people ==
Notable people that were born or lived in the Prlekija region include the following:

- Peter Dajnko, philologist
- Karol Grossmann, pioneering film maker
- Vekoslav Grmič, theologian
- Fran Ilešič, literary critic
- Božidar Kantušer, composer
- Anton Korošec, politician, prime minister of the Kingdom of Yugoslavia
- Edvard Kocbek, poet and politician
- Bratko Kreft, playwright
- Franc Ksaver Meško, author
- Vlado Miheljak, columnist
- Franz Miklosich, linguist
- Milan Osterc, football striker
- Slavko Osterc, composer
- Vika Potočnik, politician, former mayor of Ljubljana
- Anton Trstenjak, painter
- Anton Trstenjak, theologian and psychologist
- Davorin Trstenjak, philologist and political activist
- France Veber, philosopher
- Stanko Vraz, Romantic poet
