= Grabonoš =

- Location in Slovenia
- Coordinates: 46°35′18.29″N 16°0′10.41″E
- Country: Slovenia
- Traditional region: Styria
- Statistical region: Mura
- Municipality: Sveti Jurij ob Ščavnici

Area
  - Total: 5.08 km^{2} (1.96 sq mi)
- Elevation: 209.8 m (688 ft)

Population (2002)
  - Total: 222

Grabonoš (pronounced [ɡɾabɔˈnoːʃ] or [ˈɡɾaːbɔnɔʃ]) is a village in the Municipality of Sveti Jurij ob Ščavnici in northeastern Slovenia. The area is part of the traditional Styria region and is now included in the Mura Statistical Region.

A small chapel in the settlement dates to the second half of the 19th century and contains a statue of Saint Mary from around 1900.
