= Čakova =

- Location in Slovenia
- Coordinates: 46°34′51.58″N 16°1′4.41″E
- Country: Slovenia
- Traditional region: Styria
- Statistical region: Mura
- Municipality: Sveti Jurij ob Ščavnici

Area
  - Total: 1.9 km^{2} (0.73 sq mi)
- Elevation: 200.1 m (656 ft)

Population (2002)
  - Total: 82

Čakova (pronounced [ˈtʃaːkɔʋa]) is a settlement in the Municipality of Sveti Jurij ob Ščavnici in northeastern Slovenia.

== Location ==
It lies on the regional road leading north out of Sveti Jurij towards Spodnji Ivanjci.

== History ==
The area is part of the traditional Styria region. It is now included with the rest of the municipality in the Mura Statistical Region.
