= Selišči =

- Location in Slovenia
- Coordinates: 46°34′18.55″N 16°4′0.85″E
- Country: Slovenia
- Traditional region: Styria
- Statistical region: Mura
- Municipality: Sveti Jurij ob Ščavnici

Area
  - Total: 2.71 km^{2} (1.05 sq mi)
- Elevation: 211.1 m (693 ft)

Population (2002)
  - Total: 108

Selišči (pronounced [ˈseːliʃtʃi]) is a village in the Municipality of Sveti Jurij ob Ščavnici in northeastern Slovenia. The area is part of the traditional region of Styria and is now included in the Mura Statistical Region.

The village chapel was built in the Neo-Gothic style in 1927.
