= Rožički Vrh =

- Location in Slovenia
- Coordinates: 46°35′31″N 16°02′41″E
- Country: Slovenia
- Traditional region: Styria
- Statistical region: Mura
- Municipality: Sveti Jurij ob Ščavnici

Area
  - Total: 1.33 km^{2} (0.51 sq mi)
- Elevation: 276.8 m (908 ft)

Population (2002)
  - Total: 215

Rožički Vrh (pronounced [ɾɔˈʒiːtʃki ˈʋəɾx]) is a settlement in the Municipality of Sveti Jurij ob Ščavnici in northeastern Slovenia. It lies on a hill with the same name in the Slovene Hills above the Ščavnica Valley. The area is part of the traditional region of Styria and is now included in the Mura Statistical Region.
