= Kokolajnščak =

- Location in Slovenia
- Coordinates: 46°31′55.69″N 15°59′53.07″E
- Country: Slovenia
- Traditional region: Styria
- Statistical region: Mura
- Municipality: Sveti Jurij ob Ščavnici

Area
  - Total: 1.04 km^{2} (0.40 sq mi)
- Elevation: 290.2 m (952 ft)

Population (2002)
  - Total: 74

Kokolajnščak (pronounced [kɔkɔˈlaːi̯nʃtʃak]) is a settlement in the Municipality of Sveti Jurij ob Ščavnici in northeastern Slovenia. It lies in the Slovene Hills in an area that is part of the traditional region of Styria, and it is now included in the Mura Statistical Region.
