= Terbegovci =

- Location in Slovenia
- Coordinates: 46°32′44.71″N 16°1′30.2″E
- Country: Slovenia
- Traditional region: Styria
- Statistical region: Mura
- Municipality: Sveti Jurij ob Ščavnici

Area
  - Total: 3.3 km^{2} (1.3 sq mi)
- Elevation: 223.2 m (732 ft)

Population (2002)
  - Total: 122

Terbegovci (pronounced [tɛɾˈbeːɡɔu̯tsi]) is a settlement in the Municipality of Sveti Jurij ob Ščavnici in northeastern Slovenia. The area is part of the traditional Styria region and is now included in the Mura Statistical Region.
