= Galušak =

- Location in Slovenia
- Coordinates: 46°32′48.55″N 15°59′8.03″E
- Country: Slovenia
- Traditional region: Styria
- Statistical region: Mura
- Municipality: Sveti Jurij ob Ščavnici

Area
  - Total: 1.21 km^{2} (0.47 sq mi)
- Elevation: 307.6 m (1,009 ft)

Population (2002)
  - Total: 68

Galušak (pronounced [ˈɡaːluʃak]) is a settlement in the Slovene Hills in northeastern Slovenia. It lies in the Municipality of Sveti Jurij ob Ščavnici. The area is part of the traditional Styria region and is now included in the Mura Statistical Region.
