= Kutinci =

- Location in Slovenia
- Coordinates: 46°32′54.75″N 15°59′40.07″E
- Country: Slovenia
- Traditional region: Styria
- Statistical region: Mura
- Municipality: Sveti Jurij ob Ščavnici

Area
  - Total: 1.79 km^{2} (0.69 sq mi)
- Elevation: 252.1 m (827 ft)

Population (2002)
  - Total: 55

Kutinci (pronounced [ˈkuːtintsi]) is a settlement in the Slovene Hills in northeastern Slovenia. It lies in the Municipality of Sveti Jurij ob Ščavnici. The area is part of the traditional region of Styria and is now included in the Mura Statistical Region.

A small chapel in the village is dedicated to Our Lady of Lourdes and dates to the first quarter of the 20th century.
