= Mali Moravščak =

- Location in Slovenia
- Coordinates: 46°31′20.81″N 16°0′55.3″E
- Country: Slovenia
- Traditional region: Styria
- Statistical region: Mura
- Municipality: Sveti Jurij ob Ščavnici

Area
  - Total: 0.40 km^{2} (0.15 sq mi)
- Elevation: 295.4 m (969 ft)

Population (2002)
  - Total: 11

Mali Moravščak (pronounced [ˈmaːli mɔˈɾaːu̯ʃtʃak]) is a small settlement in the Municipality of Sveti Jurij ob Ščavnici of northeastern Slovenia. It lies in the Slovene Hills, just west of Moravci. The area is part of the traditional region of Styria and is now included in the Mura Statistical Region.
