= Stara Gora, Sveti Jurij ob Ščavnici =

Stara Gora
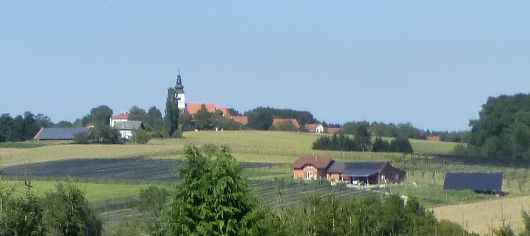

- Location in Slovenia
- Coordinates: 46°32′57.14″N 16°1′52.5″E
- Country: Slovenia
- Traditional region: Styria
- Statistical region: Mura
- Municipality: Sveti Jurij ob Ščavnici

Area
  - Total: 0.55 km^{2} (0.21 sq mi)
- Elevation: 259.7 m (852 ft)

Population (2002)
  - Total: 71

Stara Gora (pronounced [ˈstaːɾa ˈɡɔːɾa]) is a small settlement in the Municipality of Sveti Jurij ob Ščavnici in northeastern Slovenia. It lies on a small hill just south of the Ščavnica Valley. The area is part of the traditional region of Styria and is now included in the Mura Statistical Region.

The village church is dedicated to the Holy Spirit and belongs to the Parish of Sveti Jurij ob Ščavnici. It was built between 1674 and 1697.
