= Dragotinci =

Dragotinci may refer to:

- Dragotinci, Sveti Jurij ob Ščavnici, a village in Slovenia
- Dragotinci, Croatia, a village near Petrinja, Croatia

== See also ==
- Dragotintsi, a village in Bulgaria
