= Kupetinci =

- Location in Slovenia
- Coordinates: 46°34′59.56″N 16°4′14.34″E
- Country: Slovenia
- Traditional region: Styria
- Statistical region: Mura
- Municipality: Sveti Jurij ob Ščavnici

Area
  - Total: 1.57 km^{2} (0.61 sq mi)
- Elevation: 215.6 m (707 ft)

Population (2002)
  - Total: 95

Kupetinci (pronounced [ˈkuːpɛtintsi]) is a settlement in the Slovene Hills in northeastern Slovenia. It belongs to the Municipality of Sveti Jurij ob Ščavnici. The area is part of the traditional region of Styria. The entire municipality is now included in the Mura Statistical Region.

A small roadside chapel in the village dates to the 18th century.

The settlement was first mentioned between 1265 and 1267.
