= Gaberje, Ajdovščina =

Gaberje Gabrje (until 1987)
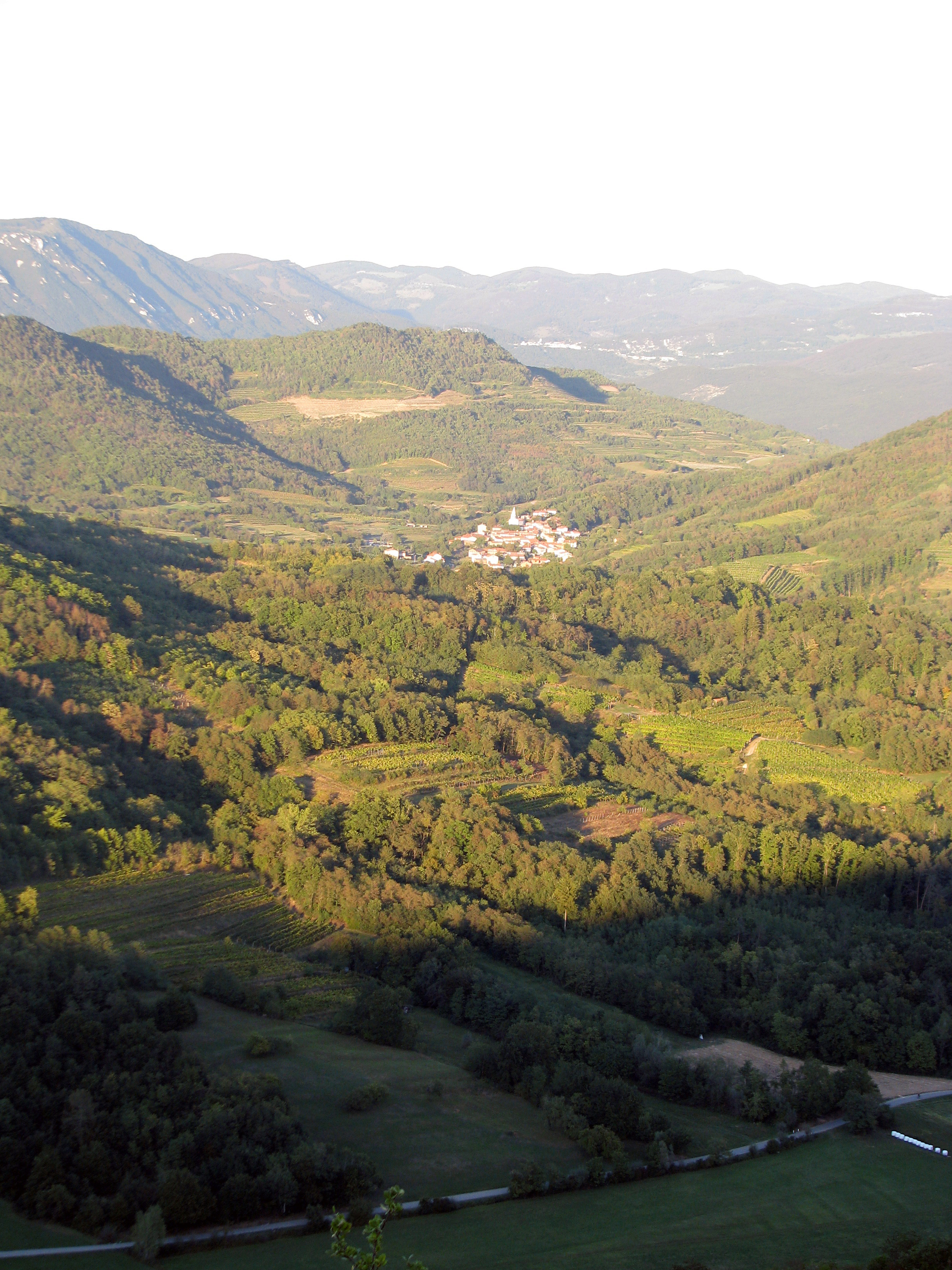

- Location in Slovenia
- Coordinates: 45°50′20.44″N 13°53′9.76″E
- Country: Slovenia
- Traditional region: Littoral
- Statistical region: Gorizia
- Municipality: Ajdovščina

Area
  - Total: 4.59 km^{2} (1.77 sq mi)
- Elevation: 191.3 m (628 ft)

Population (2023)
  - Total: 190

Gaberje (pronounced [ˈɡaːbɛɾjɛ]) is a village in the hills south of the Vipava Valley in the Municipality of Ajdovščina in the Littoral region of Slovenia. It was first mentioned in written documents dating to 1367.

== Name ==
The name of the settlement was changed from Gabrje to Gaberje in 1987. The toponym Gaberje and related names (such as Gabrc, Gabrce, Gaber, Gabrk, Gabrovlje, etc.) are relatively common in Slovenia and are derived from the common noun gaber 'hornbeam', thus referring to the local vegetation.

== Church ==
The parish church in the settlement is dedicated to Saint Martin and belongs to the Koper Diocese. Its door casing bears the date 1670, which is the date of extension and renovation of a much older church on the site.

== Cultural heritage ==
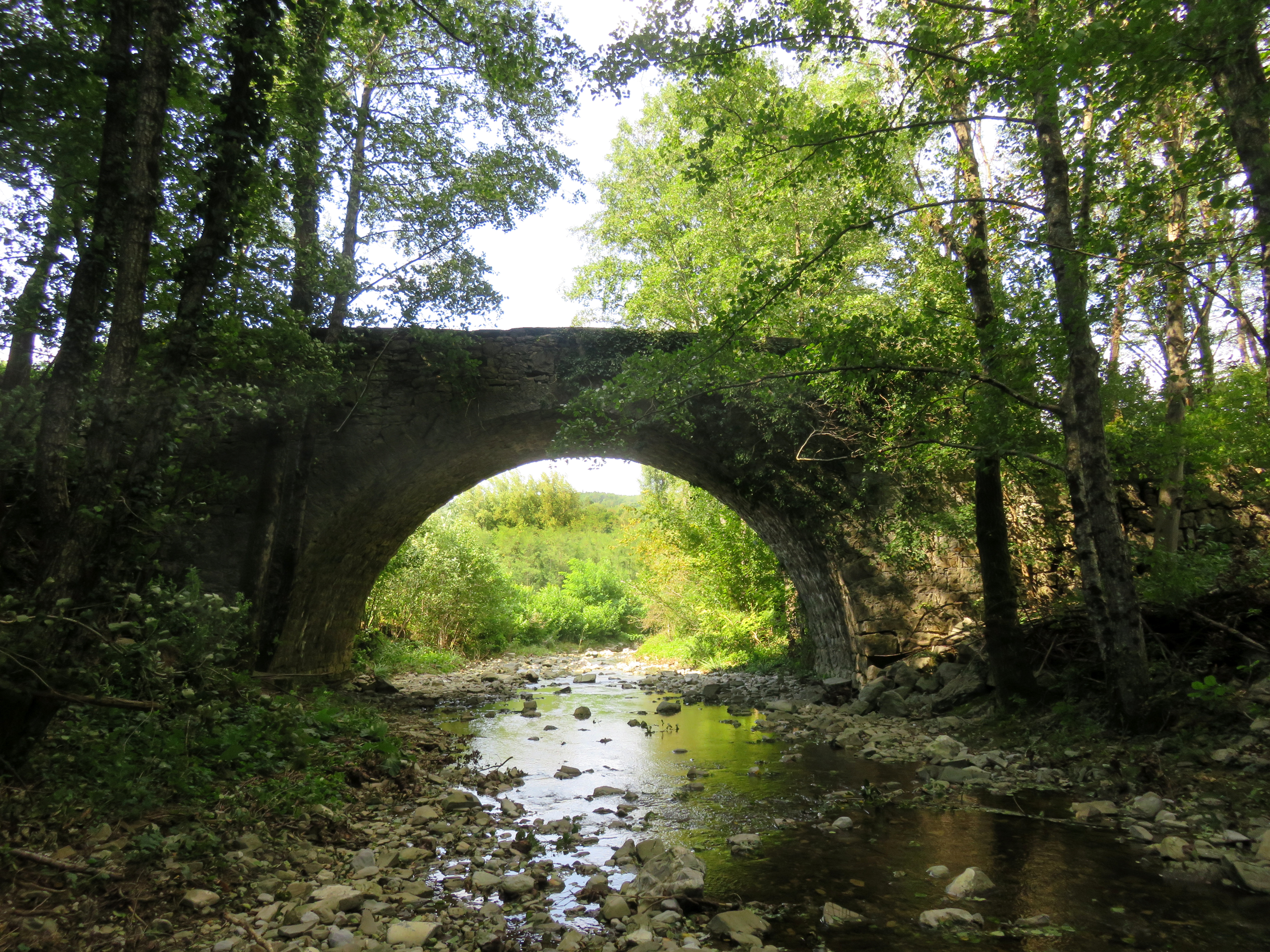
Bridge over the Branica River

Below the village, there is a stone bridge across the Branica River dating from around 1800. The bridge is built of unworked stone and has a semicircular arch. It is part of a road connection from the Branica Valley to Štanjel.
