= Jamna, Sveti Jurij ob Ščavnici =

Jamna
- Location in Slovenia
- Coordinates: 46°33′46.21″N 16°1′33.71″E
- Country: Slovenia
- Traditional region: Styria
- Statistical region: Mura
- Municipality: Sveti Jurij ob Ščavnici

Area
  - Total: 1.86 km^{2} (0.72 sq mi)
- Elevation: 206.8 m (678 ft)

Population (2002)
  - Total: 102

Jamna (pronounced [ˈjaːmna]) is a settlement in the Slovene Hills in the Municipality of Sveti Jurij ob Ščavnici in northeastern Slovenia. The area is part of the traditional region of Styria and is now included in the Mura Statistical Region.

Two small chapels in the settlement date to the second half of the 19th century.
