= Gabrc =

- Location in Slovenia
- Coordinates: 46°32′35.9″N 16°0′23.85″E
- Country: Slovenia
- Traditional region: Styria
- Statistical region: Mura
- Municipality: Sveti Jurij ob Ščavnici

Area
  - Total: 0.27 km^{2} (0.10 sq mi)
- Elevation: 281.6 m (924 ft)

Population (2002)
  - Total: 20

Gabrc (pronounced [ˈɡaːbəɾts]) is a small settlement in the Municipality of Sveti Jurij ob Ščavnici in northeastern Slovenia. It lies in the Slovene Hills. The area is part of the traditional Styria region and is now included in the Mura Statistical Region.
