= Brezje, Sveti Jurij ob Ščavnici =

Brezje
- Location in Slovenia
- Coordinates: 46°33′47.33″N 16°0′4.04″E
- Country: Slovenia
- Traditional region: Styria
- Statistical region: Mura
- Municipality: Sveti Jurij ob Ščavnici

Area
  - Total: 0.47 km^{2} (0.18 sq mi)
- Elevation: 257.3 m (844 ft)

Population (2002)
  - Total: 41

Brezje (pronounced [ˈbɾeːzjɛ]) is a small settlement in the Municipality of Sveti Jurij ob Ščavnici in northeastern Slovenia. The area is part of the traditional Styria region and is now included in the Mura Statistical Region.

== Notable people ==
Notable people that were born or lived in Brezje include:

- Fran Ilešič (1871–1941), literary historian
