= Kraljevci, Sveti Jurij ob Ščavnici =

Kraljevci
- Location in Slovenia
- Coordinates: 46°33′46.39″N 15°58′56.54″E
- Country: Slovenia
- Traditional region: Lower StyriawStyria
- Statistical region: Mura
- Municipality: Sveti Jurij ob Ščavnici

Area
  - Total: 4.02 km^{2} (1.55 sq mi)
- Elevation: 233.2 m (765 ft)

Population (2002)
  - Total: 157

Kraljevci (pronounced [ˈkɾaːljɛu̯tsi]) is a settlement in the Municipality of Sveti Jurij ob Ščavnici in northeastern Slovenia. It lies in the Slovene Hills on the road leading west out of Sveti Jurij towards Cerkvenjak. The area is part of the traditional region of Styria. It is now included in the Mura Statistical Region.

Davorin Trstenjak, a Slovene writer and historian, was born in the village in 1817. A commemorative plaque on a building in the village was unveiled in the early 20th century.
