= Municipality of Sveti Jurij ob Ščavnici =

Municipality of Slovenia

Municipality of Sveti Jurij ob Ščavnici Občina Sveti Jurij ob Ščavnici
- Municipality
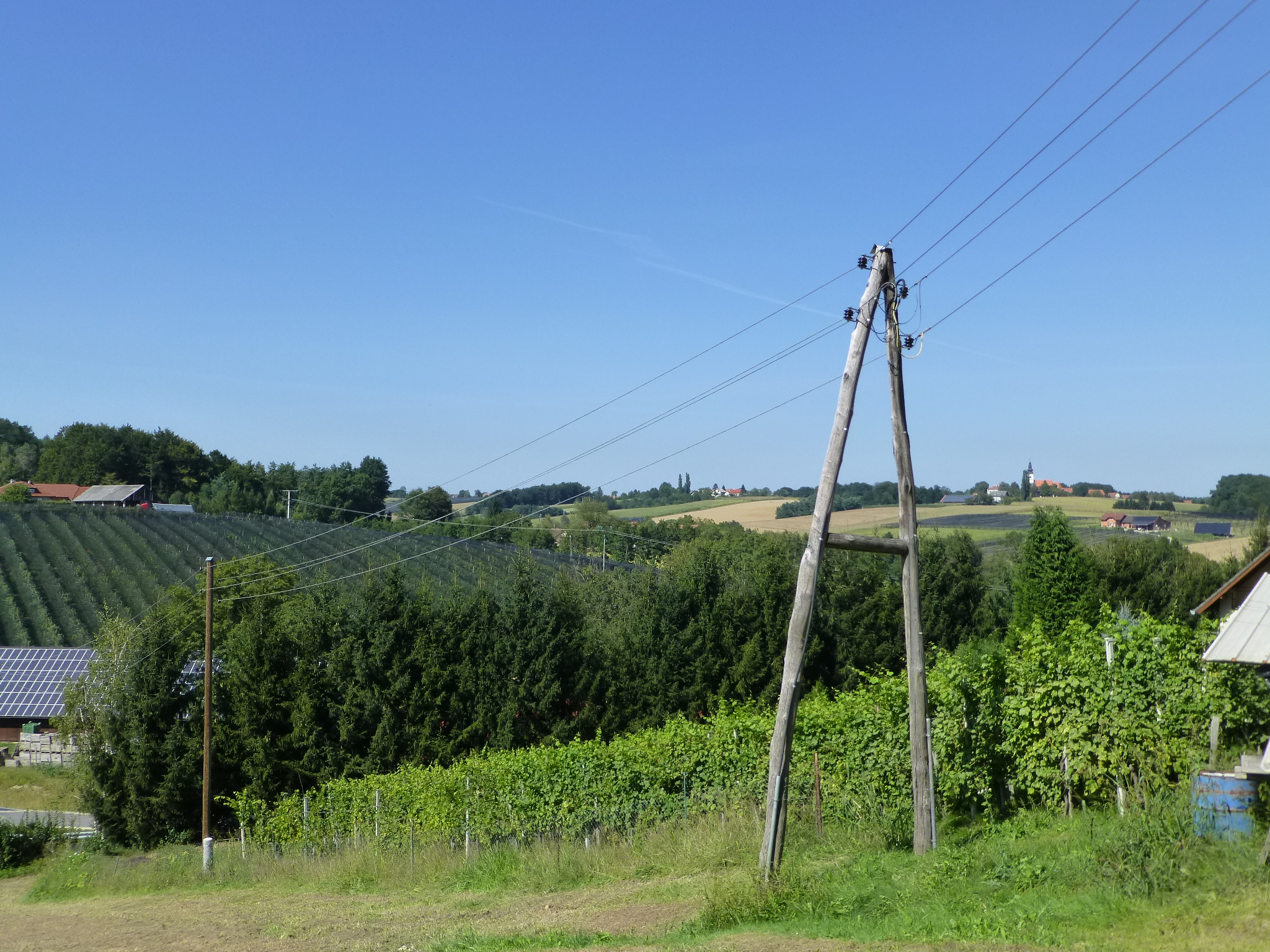

- Location of the Municipality of Sveti Jurij ob Ščavnici in Slovenia
- Coordinates: 46°19′N 15°40′E
- Country: Slovenia

Government
  - Mayor: Anton Slana

Area
  - Total: 51.3 km^{2} (19.8 sq mi)

Population (July 1, 2018)
  - Total: 2,821
  - Density: 55.0/km^{2} (142/sq mi)
- Time zone: UTC+01 (CET)
  - Summer (DST): UTC+02 (CEST)
- Website: www.sveti-jurij.si

The Municipality of Sveti Jurij ob Ščavnici (pronounced [ˈsʋeːti ˈjuːɾii̯ ɔp ˈʃtʃaːu̯nitsi]; Slovene: Občina Sveti Jurij ob Ščavnici) is a municipality in the traditional region of Styria in northeastern Slovenia. The seat of the municipality is the town of Sveti Jurij ob Ščavnici. Sveti Jurij ob Ščavnici became a municipality in 1994.

== Settlements ==
In addition to the municipal seat of Sveti Jurij ob Ščavnici, the municipality also includes the following settlements:

- Biserjane
- Blaguš
- Bolehnečici
- Brezje
- Čakova
- Dragotinci
- Gabrc
- Galušak
- Grabonoš
- Grabšinci
- Jamna
- Kočki Vrh
- Kokolajnščak
- Kraljevci
- Kupetinci
- Kutinci
- Mali Moravščak
- Rožički Vrh
- Selišči
- Slaptinci
- Sovjak
- Stanetinci
- Stara Gora
- Terbegovci
- Ženik
- Žihlava
