= Dragotinci, Sveti Jurij ob Ščavnici =

Dragotinci
- Location in Slovenia
- Coordinates: 46°34′57.91″N 16°1′56.2″E
- Country: Slovenia
- Traditional region: Styria
- Statistical region: Mura
- Municipality: Sveti Jurij ob Ščavnici

Area
  - Total: 3.27 km^{2} (1.26 sq mi)
- Elevation: 198.7 m (652 ft)

Population (2002)
  - Total: 139

Dragotinci (pronounced [dɾaɡɔˈtiːntsi]) is a settlement in the Municipality of Sveti Jurij ob Ščavnici in northeastern Slovenia. The area is part of the traditional Styria region. It is now included in the Mura Statistical Region.

The small village chapel was built in 1900 and redecorated in 1989 with an unusual iconography which apart from the conventional sacral images depicts the sun, the moon and even a piglet.
