= Sovjak, Sveti Jurij ob Ščavnici =

Sovjak
- Location in Slovenia
- Coordinates: 46°33′17.3″N 15°59′54.1″E
- Country: Slovenia
- Traditional region: Styria
- Statistical region: Mura
- Municipality: Sveti Jurij ob Ščavnici

Area
  - Total: 1.31 km^{2} (0.51 sq mi)
- Elevation: 306.3 m (1,005 ft)

Population (2002)
  - Total: 292

Sovjak (pronounced [ˈsoːʋjak]) is a settlement in the Municipality of Sveti Jurij ob Ščavnici in northeastern Slovenia. It lies in the Slovene Hills in the traditional region of Styria. The entire municipality is now included in the Mura Statistical Region.
