= Sveti Jurij ob Ščavnici =

Locality of Slovenia

Sveti Jurij ob Ščavnici Videm ob Ščavnici (until 1997)
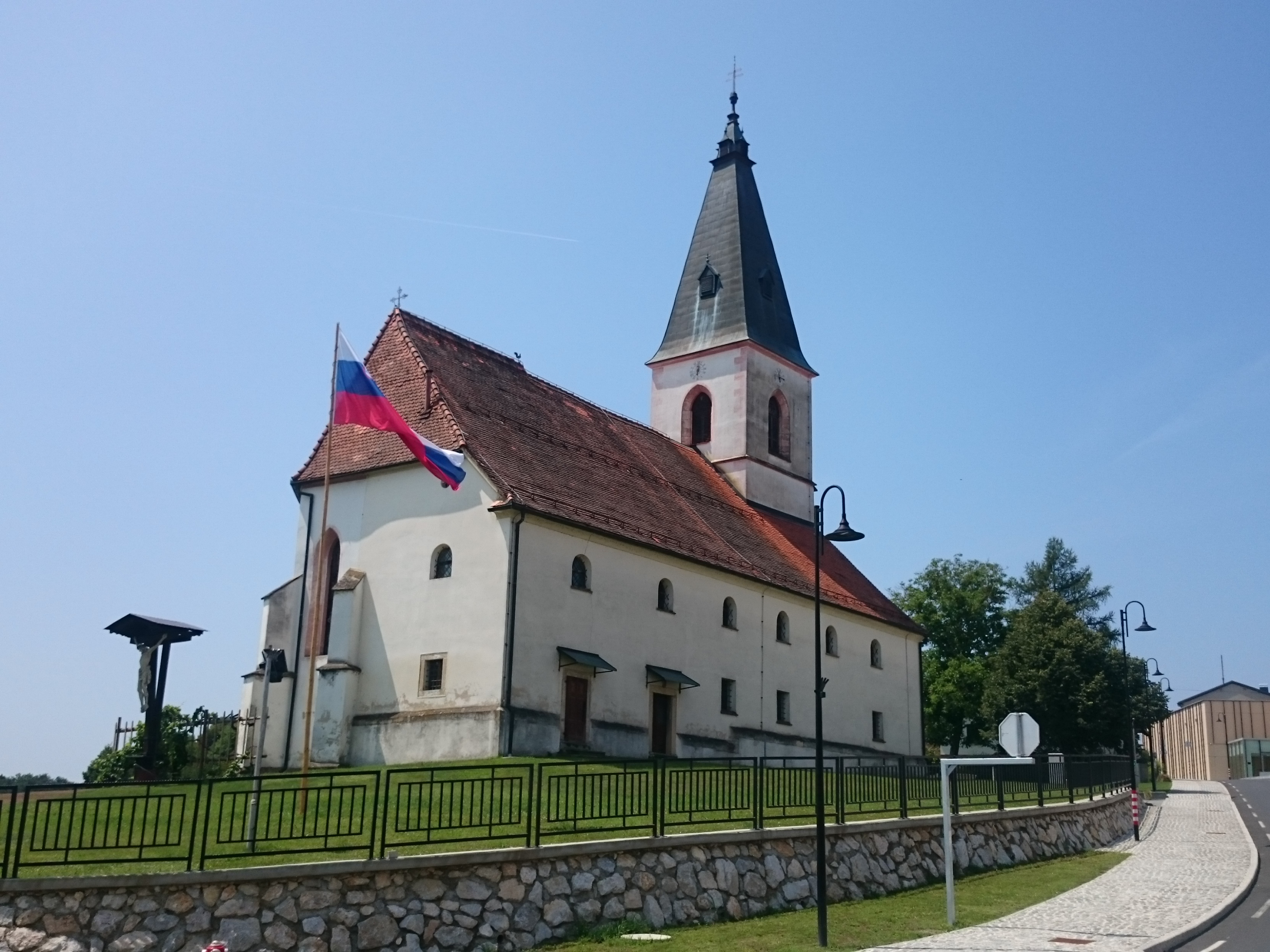

- Location in Slovenia
- Coordinates: 46°34′6″N 16°1′13″E
- Country: Slovenia
- Traditional region: Styria
- Statistical region: Mura
- Municipality: Sveti Jurij ob Ščavnici

Area
  - Total: 0.61 km^{2} (0.24 sq mi)
- Elevation: 234.1 m (768 ft)

Population (2019)
  - Total: 209

Sveti Jurij ob Ščavnici (pronounced [ˈsʋeːti ˈjuːɾii̯ ɔp ˈʃtʃaːu̯nitsi]; German: St. Georgen an der Stainz) is a settlement in northeastern Slovenia. It is the seat of the Municipality of Sveti Jurij ob Ščavnici. It lies on the Ščavnica River in the region known as Prlekija. The area is part of the traditional region of Styria. The municipality is now included in the Mura Statistical Region.

== Name ==
The settlement was first mentioned in written sources in 1680 under name Videm (borrowed from Middle High German videme 'church property'—originally, 'property left by the deceased to the church'). The settlement was known as Videm ob Ščavnici (literally, 'church property on the Ščavnica River') until 1997. Mistakenly assuming that the name had been changed from a religious name under communist Yugoslavia, the municipal authorities changed it to match the parish name Sveti Jurij ob Ščavnici (literally, 'Saint George on the Ščavnica River') on January 22, 1997.

== Church ==
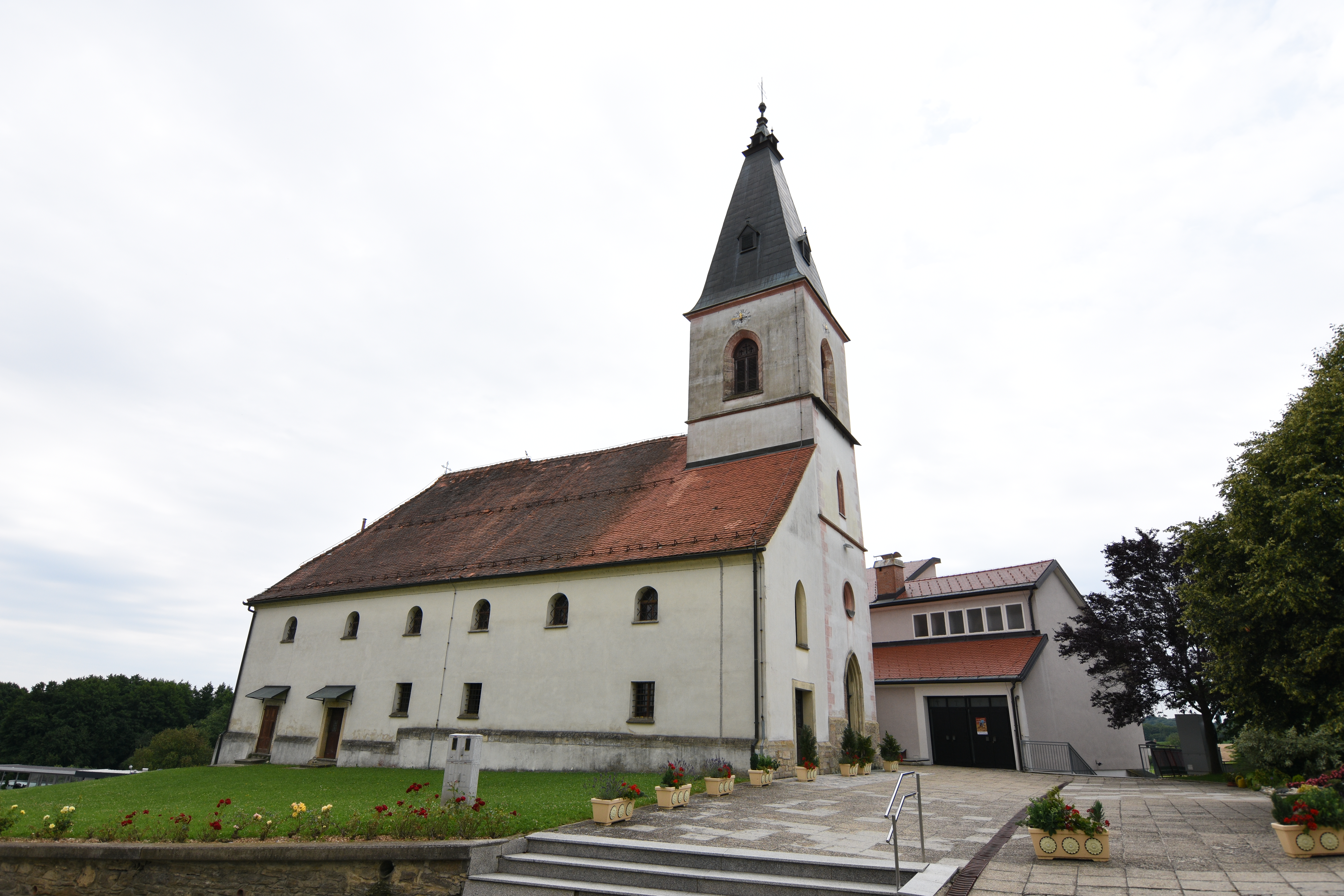
Saint George's Church

The local parish church is dedicated to Saint George (Slovene: Sveti Jurij) and belongs to the Roman Catholic Diocese of Murska Sobota. It dates to the 13th century with numerous rebuildings, adaptations, and renovations over the following centuries.

== Notable people ==
Notable people that were born or lived in Sveti Jurij ob Ščavnici include:

- Bertalan Koczuván (1828–1889), writer and teacher
- Vekoslav Grmič (1923–2005), theologian
- Edvard Kocbek (1904–1981), poet
- Bratko Kreft (1905–1996), playwright
- Ivan Kreft (1906–1985), diplomat
