= Vekoslav Grmič =

Slovenian Catholic theologian (1923–2005)

- Bishop of Maribor
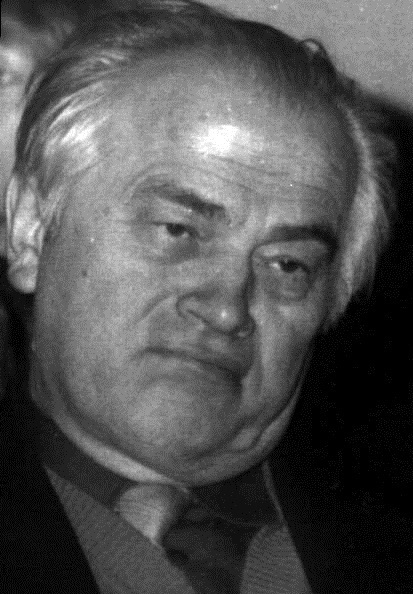
- Church: Catholic Church
- Diocese: Maribor

Orders
- Rank: Bishop

Personal details
- Died: Maribor, Slovenia
- Buried: Pobrežje Cemetery, Maribor
- Coat of arms

Vekoslav Grmič (4 June 1923 – 21 March 2005) was a Slovenian Catholic bishop and theologian, known for his sympathy towards socialist ideas.

== Biography ==
He was born in the Lower Styrian village of Sveti Jurij ob Ščavnici in what was then the Kingdom of Serbs, Croats and Slovenes. He studied at a Catholic seminary in Maribor. Already as a young man, he became influenced by the social thought of Janez Evangelist Krek, Edvard Kocbek and the German philosopher Romano Guardini. After the invasion of Yugoslavia and the Nazi occupation of northern Slovenia in April 1941, Grmič started collaborating with the Communist-led Liberation Front of the Slovenian People.

In 1950, he was ordained priest and between 1952 and 1958 he worked as a parish priest of Vransko. In 1961, he graduated from the Theological Faculty in Ljubljana with a thesis on the theological elements in the existentialist concept of angst. From 1962 until his retirement in 1991, he taught dogmatic theology at the same faculty.

In 1968, he was appointed auxiliary bishop of Maribor by Pope Paul VI. In 1980, he was removed from office by Pope John Paul II, although he nominally maintained the title of bishop and continued to teach at the Theological Faculty in Ljubljana.

Grmič was a strong supporter of liberation theology and of the political-religious thought of the Swiss reformist theologian Hans Küng. Together with the fellow Slovene Catholic theologian Janez Janžekovič, he became one of the supporters of a closer collaboration between Catholics and Marxists in Yugoslavia. During his lifetime, Grmič published more than forty books and several translation from German.

In the last decade of his life, he often voiced his opinion in public, thus becoming a somewhat controversial figure. He often held very different views from other members of the local Catholic hierarchy on several issues of social and political matters. He died in Maribor at the age of 82.

== Selected works ==
- O Bogu (On God, Ljubljana, 1966)
- Vprašanja našega časa v luči teologije: sodobna evangelizacija (The Issues of Our Time in the Light of Theology: Modern Evangelization. Tinje/Tainach, Carinthia], 1978)
- Med vero in nevero (Between Faith and Infidelity, Celje, 1969)
- Resnica iz ljubezni (Truth from Love, Ljubljana, 1979)
- Teologija v službi človeka (Theology in the Service of Man, Tinje/Tainach, 1975)
- Življenje iz upanja (Life from Hope, Ljubljana, 1981)
- Humanizem problem našega časa (Humanism and the Problem of Our Time, Trieste, 1983)
- V duhu dialoga: za človeka gre (In the Spirit of Dialogue: It's about Man, Ljubljana, 1986)
- Kocbekova odločitev za OF in (njegov) krščanski etos (Kocbek's Decision for the Liberation Front and (His) Christian Ethos, Ljubljana, 1994)
- Ušeničnikovo razumevanje umetnosti in literature (Ušeničnik's Conception of Art and Literature, Ljubljana, 1994)
- Izzivi in odgovori (Challenges and Answers, Ljubljana, 2000)
- Poslednji spisi: misli o sodobnosti (Last Writings: Thoughts on Modernity, Ljubljana, 2005)

== See also ==
- Christian left
- Christian socialism
