= Bratko Kreft =

Slovenian writer and historian (1905–1996)

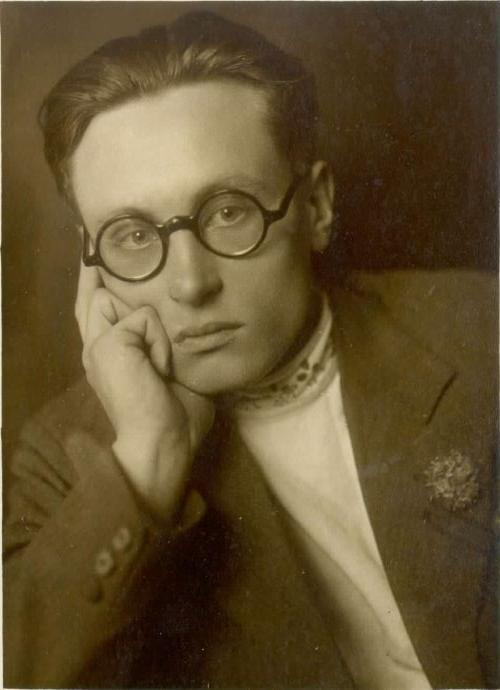
Bratko Kreft

Bratko Kreft (Maribor, 11 February 1905 – 17 July 1996, Ljubljana) was a Slovenian playwright, writer, literary and theater historian, and director.

== Biography ==
Kreft grew up in Prlekija. He studied Slavic studies in Vienna and Ljubljana. In Ljubljana he also studied comparative literature and literary theory. Among other things, he was the editor and secretary of Kosovel's Mladina, the artistic director and director of the Workers' Theater (Slovene: Delavski oder) in Ljubljana, and the director of the National Theater in Ljubljana. He was a professor of contemporary Russian literature at the University of Ljubljana's Faculty of Arts and a corresponding member of Yugoslav Academy of Sciences and Arts (JAZU). He received the Prešeren Award three times.

== Politics ==
Kreft was a member of the Communist Party of Yugoslavia (KPJ) until his expulsion in 1940.

== Works ==
As a playwright, Kreft preferred topics from Slovenian history. Rather than individual fates, he was interested in the relationships between social classes.

Among his major plays are:

- Celjski grofje
- Kreature (Creatures)
- Velika puntarija
- Kranjski komedijanti
- Tugomer
- Balada o poročniku in Marjutki
- V ječi življenja
