= Edvard Kocbek =

Slovenian writer

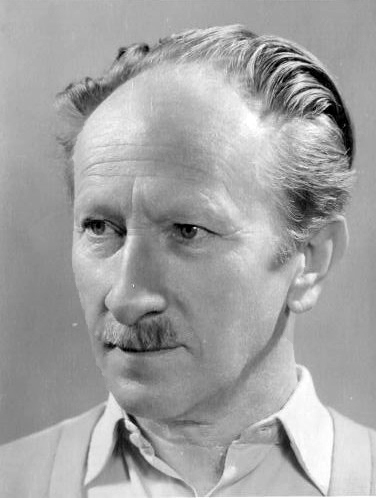
- Born: Eduard Kocbek; 27 September 1904; Sveti Jurij ob Ščavnici, Duchy of Styria, Austria-Hungary (now in Slovenia)
- Died: 3 November 1981 (aged 77); Ljubljana, Slovenia, Yugoslavia
- Occupations: poet, writer, politician, essayist, translator
- Spouse: Zdravka Koprivnjak
- Children: Lučka Kocbek, Matjaž Kocbek, Jurij Kocbek

Edvard Kocbek (pronounced [ˈéːdʋaɾt ˈkóːdzbɛk],) (27 September 1904 – 3 November 1981) was a Slovenian Yugoslav poet, writer, essayist, translator, member of Christian Socialists in the Liberation Front of the Slovene Nation and Slovene Partisans. He is considered one of the best authors who have written in Slovene, and one of the best Slovene poets after Prešeren. His political role during and after World War II made him one of the most controversial figures in Slovenia in the 20th century.

== Biography ==
=== Early life and school ===
Kocbek was born in the village of Sveti Jurij ob Ščavnici in the Duchy of Styria, then part of the Austro-Hungarian Empire, now in Slovenia, and baptized Eduard Kocbek. His father Valentin Kocbek was originally from the nearby Slovene Hills (Slovene: Slovenske gorice) area, and his mother Matilda, née Plohl, was from the neighboring village of Sveti Tomaž in the Prlekija Hills. The couple moved to Sveti Jurij, where Valentin Kocbek worked as an organist in the local Roman Catholic church. Edvard was the second of four children.

He attended the German-language high school in Maribor, where he witnessed with enthusiasm the takeover of the town by the Slovene volunteers led by general Rudolf Maister. He later switched to the Slovene-language high school in Ptuj. During his stay in Ptuj, he befriended the later editor and priest Stanko Cajnkar and dramatist Ivan Mrak. His Slovene language teacher was Anton Sovre, the most prominent classical philologist and translator from Greek in Slovenia between the two world wars. Sovre was the first to discover Kocbek's literary talent and encourage him to write and to participate in the dramatic circle. He also developed an early passion for French language and culture. During the same period, he became active in the Catholic athletic club Orel.

=== Youthful activism ===
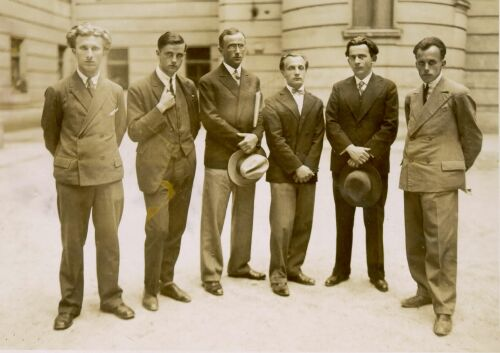
Kocbek (left) with a group of young Slovenian writers in Ljubljana, 1925. Left to right: Edvard Kocbek, Bogomil Hrovat, Slavko Grum, Anton Ocvirk, Josip Vidmar, Vladimir Bartol

After graduating from the lower high school in Ptuj, he enrolled in the classical gymnasium in Maribor; he was the first generation of students who took their courses entirely in Slovene (before that, courses were still partially taught in German). During his high school years in Maribor, he joined a group of young Christian socialists who wanted to continue the legacy of both the Slovene Christian socialist political activist and thinker Janez Evangelist Krek, and the Social democratic author Ivan Cankar. This young Catholic movement was inspired by the German Catholic theologian and philosopher Romano Guardini. They strove for a more authentic liturgy and religiosity, which would base on the believer's personal relationship with God; they rejected clericalism, social conservativism and capitalism, and demanded the development of a new social order, based on an ethically renewed individual. The group became eventually known as the "Crusaders" (Slovene: križarji), after the journal Križ na gori ("Cross on the Mountain"), edited by the poet Anton Vodnik, who became one of the spiritual leaders of the group.

In 1925, Kocbek graduated from the Maribor gymnasium and went to a long excursion through Italy together with his close friend Pino Mlakar. Upon returning, he decided to enroll to the Maribor priest seminar; he however quit after two years and enrolled at the University of Ljubljana, where he studied French language and literature.

In 1928, he became the chief editor of the journal Križ na Gori, which changed its name to Križ (Cross). He remained active in the Catholic youth movement. During this time, he also published his first poems in the prominent Catholic cultural magazine Dom in svet.

Between 1928 and 1929, he stayed a year in Berlin, where he attended courses by Romano Guardini at the Humboldt University. There, he also established contacts with the local leftist, especially Marxist subculture.

Upon returning to Yugoslavia and finishing his studies, he taught at elementary schools in Bjelovar in Croatia.

In 1931, he received a scholarship to study in Lyon. He also visited Paris, where he met with the French thinker Emmanuel Mounier who introduced him to the personalist philosophy. For the rest of his life, Kocbek would maintain contacts with the circle around the French magazine Esprit, with which he felt the strongest intellectual affinity. Throughout his life, Kocbek maintained contacts with several French Christian left thinkers, most notably with the writer Jean-Marie Domenach.

After his return to Yugoslavia in 1932, he was transferred from Bjelovar to Varaždin, also in Croatia. He however maintained close contacts with Slovene intellectual circles. In 1935, he published his first collection of poems, Zemlja (Soil), a hymnic and modernist hommage to the stillness of the rural life. The same year, he married a Croat woman from Varaždin, Zdravka Koprivnjak.

In 1936, he returned to Slovenia, where he was employed as professor of French language at the Bežigrad Grammar School.

=== Anti-Fascist resistance ===
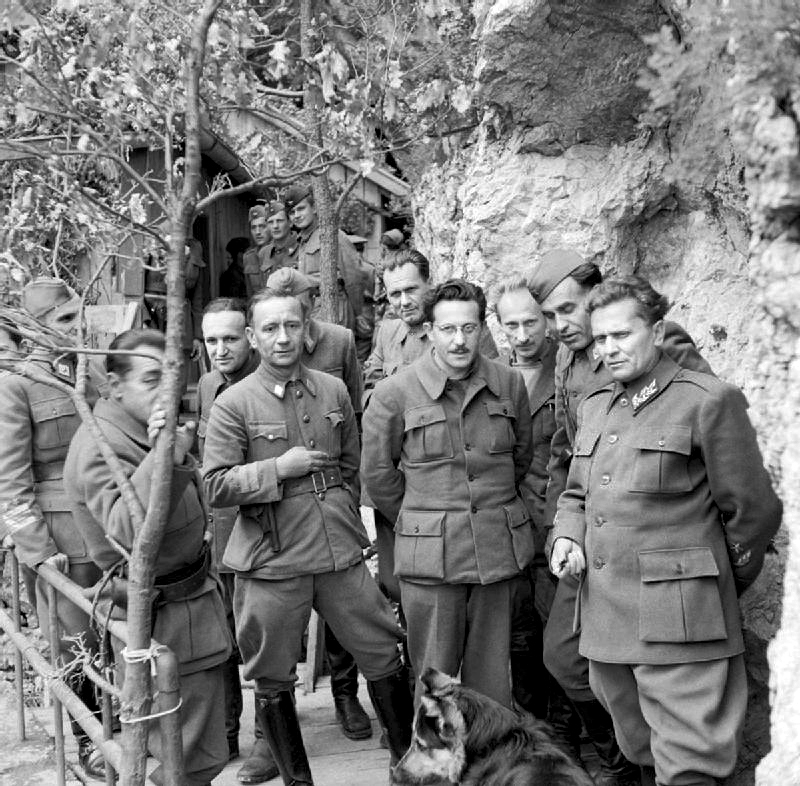
Kocbek (third from the right, in the back) with Marshall Tito (first from the right) and a group of Yugoslav Communist resistance leaders in Drvar cave Bosnia in 1944.

In 1937, Kocbek wrote an article called "Reflections on Spain" (Premišljevanje o Španiji), in which he attacked the Spanish clergy who supported the pro-Fascist forces of general Francisco Franco in the Spanish Civil War. The article, published in the liberal Catholic magazine Dom in svet, caused a scandal among Slovene Catholics, which reached its height by the condemnation of Kocbek's positions by the bishop of Ljubljana, Gregorij Rožman. As a consequence, Kocbek became the referential figure on the Christian left in Slovenia.

In 1938, Kocbek founded a new journal, Dejanje (The Action), which soon emerged as one of the most influential journals in Slovenia. Young poets such as Ivan Hribovšek gathered around Kocbek and published their work in Dejanje.

Between 1937 and 1941, Kocbek maintained an ambiguous position towards Communism: on the one hand, he rejected both "left and right totalitarianism", on the other he maintained contacts with both Slovene Communists and the left liberal intellectuals around the journals Sodobnost and Ljubljanski zvon, in an attempt to establish a popular front against the Fascist threat.

Shortly after the Axis invasion of Yugoslavia in April 1941, Kocbek was among the founders of the Liberation Front of the Slovene Nation as member of its Christian Socialist group.

After several months in underground during the Italian occupation, Kocbek joined the Slovene Partisans where in 1943 he was forced to agree to dissolve the Christian Socialist group within the Liberation Front and recognized the absolute primacy of the Communist Party of Slovenia within the Partisans.

Just before the end of World War II, he was nominated as Minister for Slovenia in the interim Yugoslav government led by Josip Broz Tito. After the end of the war, he was given several other functions within the new Communist regime, all of them without any real power.

=== Removal from public life ===
In 1951, Kocbek published a volume of short stories, entitled "Fear and Courage" (Strah in pogum), in which he touched the issue of moral dilemmas in the Partisan fight during World War II. The Communist regime used the book as an excuse to launch a massive propaganda attack on his person, forcing him to completely withdraw to private life in 1952, placing him under surveillance until the end of his life. In the next decade, he was not allowed to appear in public, let alone publish his books or essays. During this time, he earned his living by translating. Among others, he translated works by Balzac, Guy de Maupassant, Antoine de Saint-Exupéry, and Max Frisch.

In the years of his isolation, Kocbek turned almost exclusively to poetry, where he explored philosophical and ethical issues in a modernist style. After 1964, Kocbek was allowed some more public appearance, and many of his poems were allowed to be published for the first time after 1952. His later modernist poetry became an important source of inspiration for the young generations of Slovene authors, including such leading figures like Dominik Smole, Jože Snoj, Tomaž Šalamun, Marjan Rožanc, and many others.

=== The Zaliv Scandal ===
Following the 1975 Zaliv Scandal, the Communist regime launched another massive denigration campaign against him. The international pressure on Yugoslavia, especially the intervention of the German writer Heinrich Böll, was likely the main element that protected Kocbek from judicial prosecution. He died in Ljubljana in 1981 and was buried in the Žale cemetery.

=== Persecuted figure ===
After his removal from public life in 1952, Kocbek was under constant surveillance of the Yugoslav Secret Police, the UDBA. His personal file (under the number 584), written from 1944 to 1981, has 4,268 pages of reports. Sixty-nine secret police officials followed Kocbek between 1952 and 1981. Many of Kocbek's close friends were hired by the police to spy on him: the most reports were written by the essayist Jože Javoršek.

In 1976, two of his closest friends, Viktor Blažič and Franc Miklavčič, were arrested and placed on trial for belonging to "Kocbek's secret circle." Kocbek himself, however, was never arrested, although he was interrogated by the secret police several times. Several of his personal files were stolen and were never recovered, and his apartment was wired. In the mid-1970s, during a renovation of their apartment, Kocbek's son Jurij Kocbek discovered a microphone hidden in the wall. Kocbek wrote a famous poem for the occasion, entitled A Microphone in the Wall (Mikrofon v zidu), in which he poetically juxtaposed technology to human activity.

=== Personal life ===
Kocbek was married and had three children. His daughter Lučka died in 1973 at the age of 34 because of a cerebral hemorrhage. His older son Matjaž Kocbek (1946–2013), became a renowned poet and art theorist, and his younger son Jurij Kocbek (1949–2009) was a photographer and graphic designer.

In addition to Slovene, Kocbek was fluent in German, French, and Serbo-Croatian, and knew Latin and ancient Greek.

== Legacy and commemoration ==
In the 1980s, and especially in the 1990s, Kocbek's literary oeuvre became highly praised, and his role as a writer was positively re-assessed. In 1998, a street in Ljubljana's Bežigrad district was named after him, A street in Celje is also named after him.

In 2004, the centenary of Kocbek's birth was celebrated with many events, culminating in an official state celebration with the Slovenian Prime Minister Anton Rop as the main speaker. A sitting statue of the poet was ceremonially unveiled in the immediate vicinity of the Tivoli Pond in Tivoli Park in Ljubljana. It is a bronze statue by the sculptor Boštjan Drinovec. The poet sits on a bank and looks at his 30 cm (12 in) double on a handhold of the bank.

== Works ==
=== Poetry ===
- Zemlja ("Earth". Ljubljana: Nova založba, 1934).
- Groza ("Dread". Ljubljana: Slovenska matica, 1963).
- Poročilo: pesmi ("Report: Poems"; Maribor: Založba Obzorja, 1969).
- Žerjavica ("Embers". Trieste: Založništvo tržaškega tiska, 1974).
- Zbrane pesmi ("Collected Poems". Ljubljana: Cankarjeva zalozba, 1977).

=== Prose ===
- Strah in pogum: štiri novele ("Fear and Courage: Four Short Stories". Ljubljana: Državna založba Slovenije, 1951).

=== Essays and diaries ===
- Tovarišija: dnevniški zapiski od 17. maja 1942 do 1. maja 1943 ("The Comradeship: Diary Entries from 17th May 1942 to 1st May 1943". Ljubljana: Državna založba Slovenije, 1949).
- Slovensko poslanstvo : dnevnik s poti v Jajce 1943 ("The Slovene Mission: Diary from the Journey to Jajce, 1943". Celje: Mohorjeva družba, 1964).
- Listina : dnevniški zapiski od 3. maja do 2. decembra 1943 ("The Document: Diary Entries from 3rd May to 2nd December 1943." Ljubljana: Slovenska matica, 1967).
- Eros in seksus ("Eros and Sexuality". Ljubljana: Naše tromostovje, 1970), with a preface by Franc Rode.
- Svoboda in nujnost: pričevanja ("Freedom and Necessity: Testimonies". Celje: Mohorjeva družba, 1974), with a preface by France Vodnik.
- Krogi navznoter ("Inside Circles". Ljubljana: Slovenska matica, 1977).
- Pred viharjem ("Before the Storm". Ljubljana: Slovenska matica, 1980), with a preface by Janez Gradišnik.
- Sodobni misleci ("Contemporary Thinkers". Ljubljana: Slovenska matica, 1981), with a preface by Janez Gradišnik.

=== Translations to English ===
- The Lipizzaners (poetry) (Ljubljana: Association of Slovene Writers, 1989).
- Na vratih zvečer = At the Door at Evening (poetry) (Dorion, Quebec & Ljubljana: The Muses' Co., Aleph, 1990).
- Embers in the house of night : selected poems of Edvard Kocbek (Santa Fe, New Mexico: Lumen, 1999).
- Nothing Is Lost: Selected Poems (Princeton, Oxford: Princeton University Press, 2004).

== See also ==
- Slovenian literature
- History of Slovenia

Political offices
Preceded by Prime Minister of Yugoslavia; Drago Marušič	Minister for Slovenia; 7 March 1945–5 May 1945	Succeeded by Prime Minister of Slovenia; Boris Kidrič
