= Ščavnica =

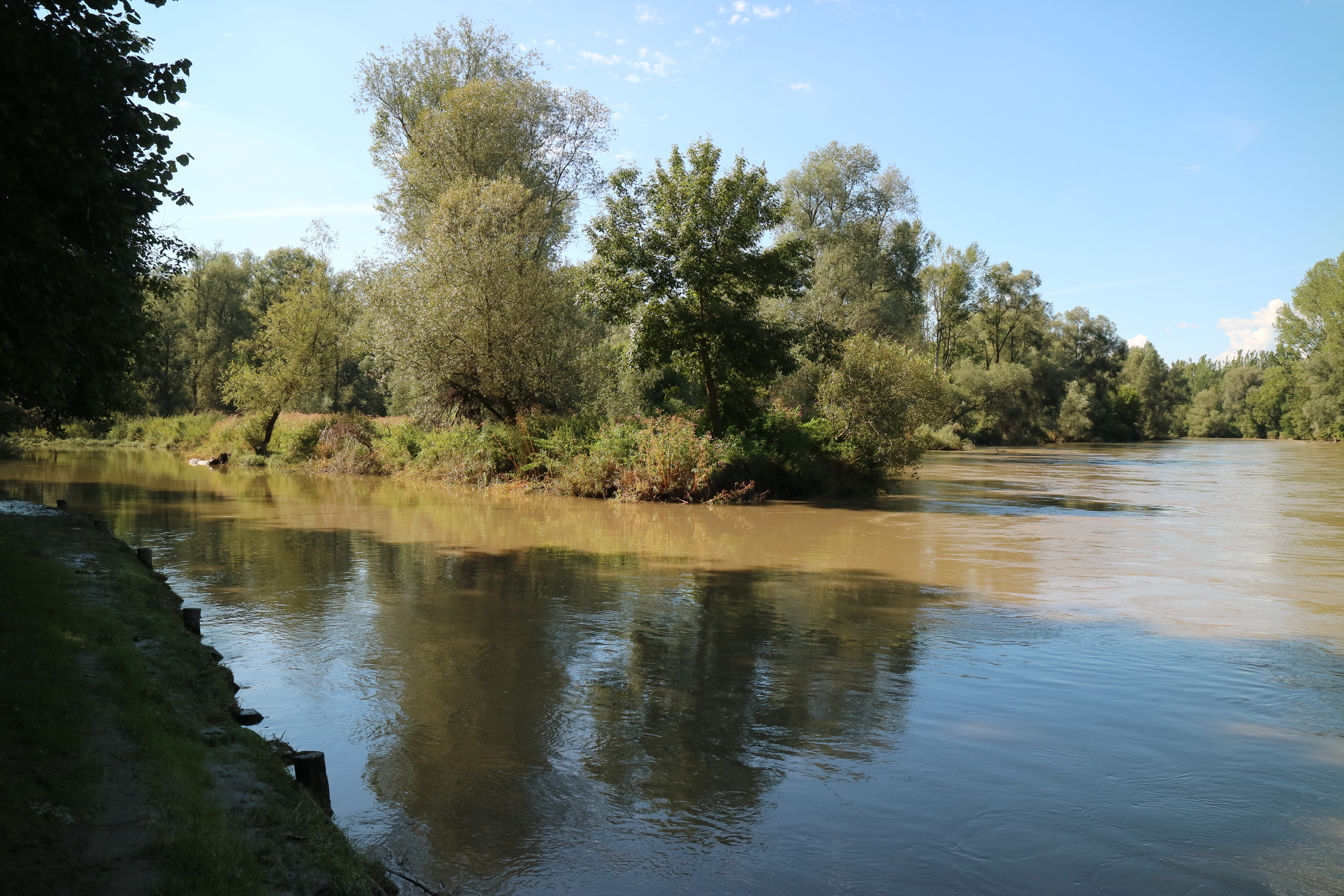
- Ščavnica mouth at the Mur

Location
- Country: Slovenia

Physical characteristics
- Mouth: Mur
  - location: Razkrižje
  - coordinates: 46.5237°N 16.3035°E
- Length: 56 km (35 mi)
- Basin size: 288 km^{2} (111 sq mi)

Basin features
- Progression: Mur→ Drava→ Danube→ Black Sea

The Ščavnica (pronounced [ˈʃtʃáːwnitsa]; German: Stainz) is a 56-kilometer (35 mi) river in Styria, Slovenia. It sources near Zgornja Velka and flows along the Slovene Hills towards the southeast. It passes Negova Castle and Sveti Jurij ob Ščavnici, traverses Lake Gajševci (Slovene: Gajševsko jezero) and the town of Ljutomer, and finally joins the Mur from the right in Razkrižje.

The Ščavnica is one of the most heavily polluted rivers in Slovenia.

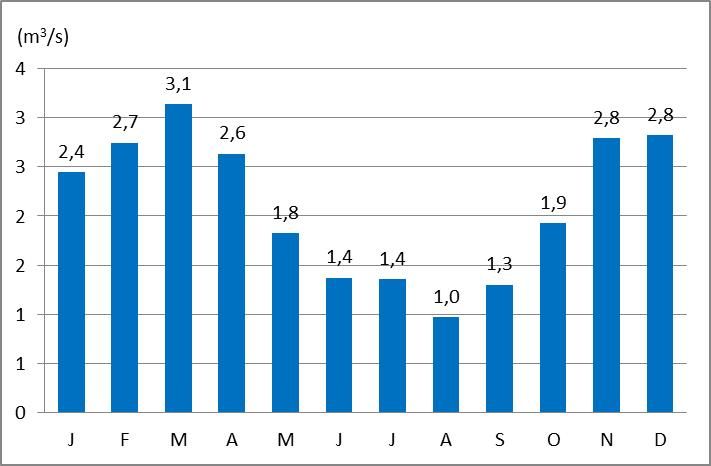
The average monthly discharge of the Ščavnica at Pristava (1971–2000)
