= Styria (Slovenia) =

Traditional region of Slovenia

Coordinates: 46°22′0″N 15°29′0″E

Styria Štajerska (Slovene) Slovenian Styria Lower Styria
- Traditional region
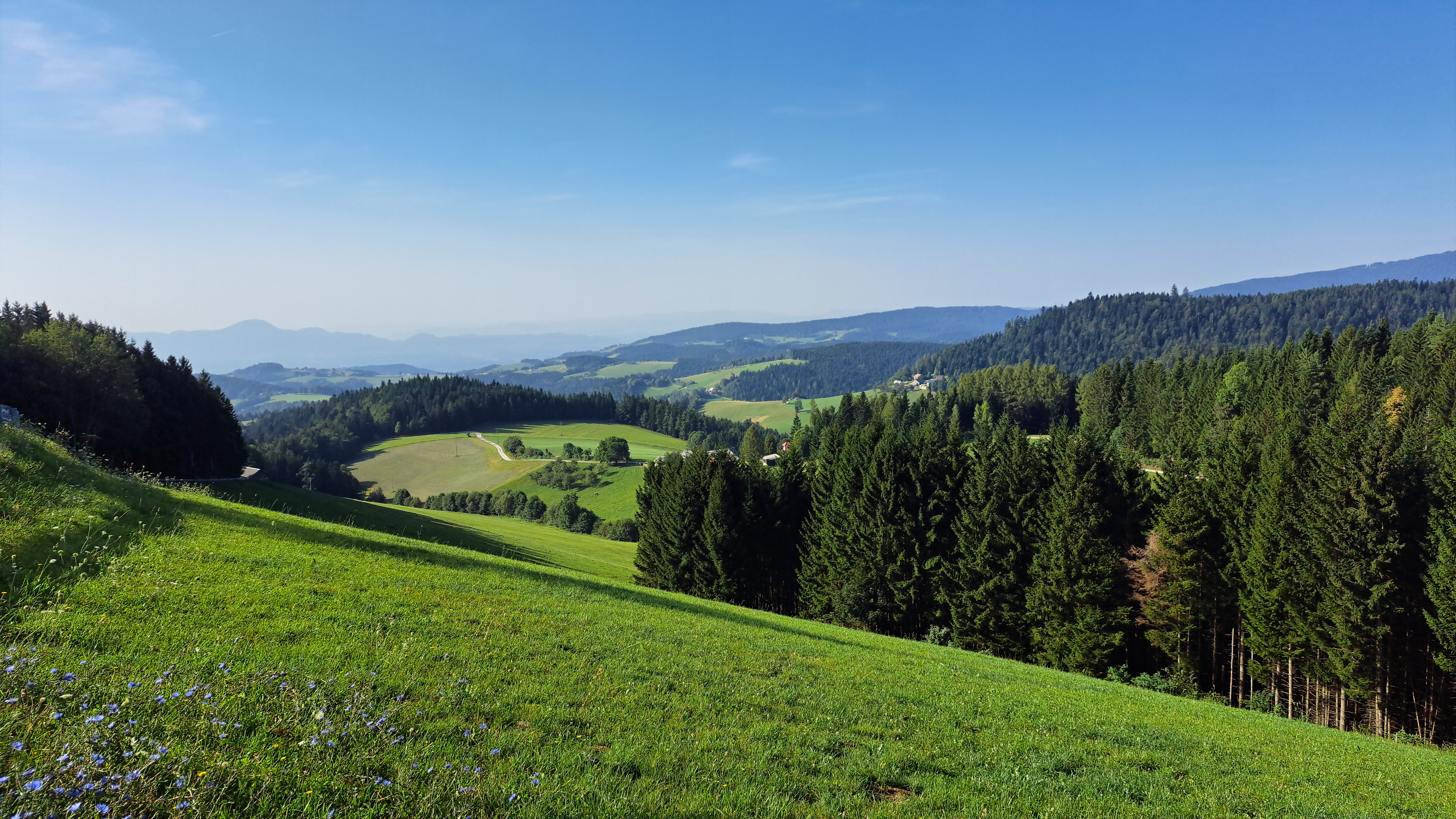
- Typical Lower Styrian rural landscape in Pohorje

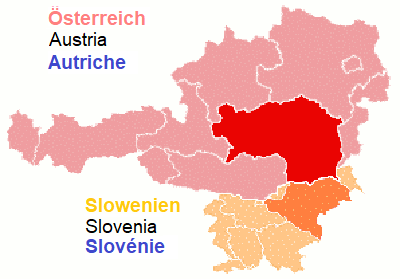
- Territory of the former Styrian duchy, superimposed on the modern borders of Austria and Slovenia
- Country: Slovenia
- Elevation: 300 m (980 ft)
- Demonym: Styrian

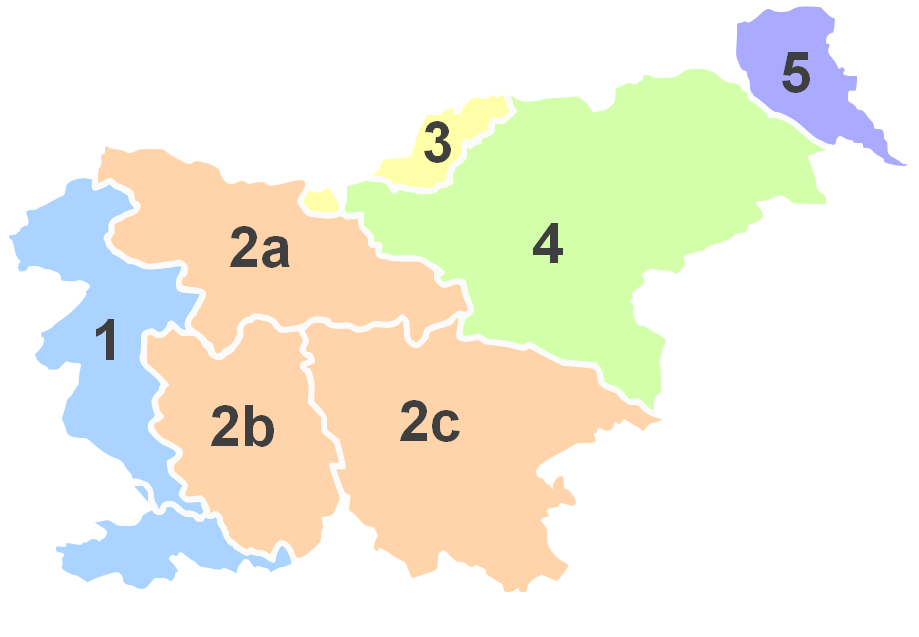
Traditional regions of Slovenia.: 1. Littoral; 2. Carniola: 2a Upper, 2b Inner, 2c Lower; 3. Carinthia; 4. Styria; 5. Prekmurje

Styria (/ˈstɪəriə/; Slovene: Štajerska [ˈʃtáːjɛɾska]), also known as Slovenian Styria (Slovenska Štajerska; Austrian German: Slowenische Steiermark) or Lower Styria (Spodnja Štajerska; Untersteiermark) to differentiate it from Austrian Styria, is a traditional region in northeastern Slovenia, comprising the southern third of the former Duchy of Styria. The population of Styria in its historical boundaries amounts to around 705,000 inhabitants, or 34.5% of the population of Slovenia. Its largest city and urban center is Maribor, with other urban centers including Celje, Velenje, Ptuj and Trbovlje.

== Use of the term ==
In the 19th century, the Styrian duchy, which existed as a distinct political-administrative entity from 1056 to 1918, used to be divided into three traditional regions: Upper Styria (Obersteiermark; Zgornja Štajerska), Central Styria (Mittelsteiermark; Srednja Štajerska), and Lower Styria, stretching from the Mur River and the Slovene Hills in the north down to the Sava. Upper Styria and Central Styria, predominantly German-speaking, today form the Austrian state of Styria (Steiermark). The southern third, predominantly Slovene-speaking Lower Styria, became part of the Kingdom of Serbs, Croats and Slovenes (Yugoslavia) after World War I. After World War II, it became part of the predecessor of modern Slovenia, the Socialist Republic of Slovenia.

Although used interchangeably at times, the term "Southern Styria" (Südsteiermark) refers to the southern districts of the Austrian state of Styria, whereas the term "Lower Styria" (Spodnja Štajerska) refers to the region of Styria in northeastern Slovenia.

The Slovene name Štajerska is borrowed and adapted from the German name for the region, Steiermark. Both ultimately derive from Celtic, via the river Steyr.

== History ==
In the Middle Ages, the Lower Styrian lands were ruled by several immediate (reichsfrei) dynasties like the Counts of Celje, whose large possessions were not incorporated by the Habsburg dukes until the 15th century.

According to the last Austro-Hungarian census of 1910, Lower Styria had around 498,000 inhabitants, of which around 82% were Slovene and around 18% German speakers.

In 1918, after the disintegration of the Austro-Hungarian monarchy following World War I, the Duchy of Styria was divided between the newly established states of German Austria and the Yugoslav State of Slovenes, Croats and Serbs. In early November 1918, Rudolf Maister, a Slovene major of the former Austro-Hungarian Army, with about 4,000 local volunteers occupied Lower Styria and the town of Maribor and claimed it for Yugoslavia. After a short fight with German-Austrian paramilitary units, the current border was established, acknowledged by the provisional Styrian assembly at Graz. By December 1918, all of Lower Styria was de facto included in the Kingdom of Serbs, Croats, and Slovenes. A protest by German-speaking Marburg citizens resulted in the Marburg Bloody Sunday, when 13 people were killed and about 60 wounded.

Confirmed by the 1919 Treaty of Saint-Germain-en-Laye, the border between Yugoslav and Austrian Styria mostly followed the ethnic-linguistic dividing line between Slovenes and ethnic Germans. Nevertheless, several predominantly German-speaking towns were annexed into Yugoslavia, such as Maribor (Marburg an der Drau) (80% German speakers), Ptuj (Pettau) (86%), and Celje (Cilli) (67%); in addition, the German-speaking area around the village of Apače (Abstall) was annexed to Yugoslavia. According to the 1921 Yugoslav census, some 22,500 ethnic Germans lived in Yugoslav Lower Styria. They represented around 4.5% of the overall population of the region, and around 57% of all ethnic Germans in Slovenia. In 1931, this number dropped to around 12,500 or 2.3% of the regional population, and around 45% of all ethnic Germans in Slovenia.

In 1922, the County of Maribor was formed, comprising most of the territory of Slovene Styria, plus the Prekmurje and the Međimurje regions. After the coup d'etat of King Alexander I of Yugoslavia in January 1929, the counties were abolished and replaced with nine Banates (Slovene: Banovina). Following the reorganization implemented by the Yugoslav constitution of 1931, Slovene Styria was incorporated in the newly established Drava Banovina, which was more or less identical with Slovenia, with Ljubljana as its capital city.

In April 1941, Nazi Germany invaded Yugoslavia and Slovene Styria was annexed, becoming CdZ-Gebiet Untersteiermark under Reichsgau Steiermark. A policy of violent Germanization was introduced. Public use of Slovene was prohibited, and all Slovene associations were dissolved. Members of all professional and intellectual groups, including many clergymen, were expelled. Between April 1941 and May 1942, around 80,000 Slovenes (almost 15% of the overall population) were expelled from Lower Styria, or resettled to other parts of the Reich. As a reaction, a resistance movement developed. Many areas of Lower Styria witnessed fierce fighting between German troops and Slovene partisan units.

After World War II, Yugoslav authority over the region was established and Slovene Styria became an integral part of the Socialist Republic of Slovenia. According to prior decisions made by the Anti-Fascist Council of the People's Liberation of Yugoslavia, an expulsion of the remaining ethnic German population was carried out, regardless of their links to the Nazi regime.

Between the 1950s and 1970s, many areas of the region underwent rapid industrialization. Towns like Maribor, Celje, and Velenje became among the most important industrial centers of Slovenia and Yugoslavia.

== Statistical division ==
Statistical regions of Slovenia

Lower Styria has no official status as an administrative or statistical unit within Slovenia. In 2005, the country was divided into 12 statistical regions. The bulk of Lower Styria is subdivided between the Drava Statistical Region (Slovene: podravska statistična regija) with its seat in Maribor, and the Savinja Statistical Region (savinjska statistična regija) with its seat in Celje. Smaller areas of Lower Styria are included in:

- The Mura Statistical Region (pomurska statistična regija): the subregion called Prlekija, with the municipalities of Apače, Gornja Radgona, Križevci, Ljutomer, Radenci, Razkrižje, Sveti Jurij ob Ščavnici, and Veržej;
- The Carinthia Statistical Region (koroška statistična regija): the municipalities of Mislinja, Muta, Podvelka, Radlje ob Dravi, Ribnica na Pohorju, Slovenj Gradec, and Vuzenica;
- The Lower Sava Statistical Region (spodnjeposavska statistična regija): the Municipality of Bistrica ob Sotli, and the territory on the left bank of the Sava River in the municipalities of Brežice, Krško, Sevnica, and Radeče;
- The Central Sava Statistical Region (zasavska statistična regija): the territory on the left bank of the Sava River in the municipalities of Hrastnik and Trbovlje.

Nowadays, many of these peripheral areas are no longer considered part of Styria. An exception is the Prlekija subregion, which is still widely considered part of the region. The name Štajerska disappeared from official use in 1922, when the Kingdom of Serbs, Croats, and Slovenes was administratively divided into oblasts. Nevertheless, the name is still very much alive in both colloquial and media language, and it is part of established cultural and geographical terminology. It also continues to be employed in the promotion of tourism.

== Cities and towns ==
The cultural and economic centre of Lower Styria has always been the city of Maribor. Other major towns are Brežice, Celje, Ptuj, Slovenj Gradec, Slovenska Bistrica, and Velenje.

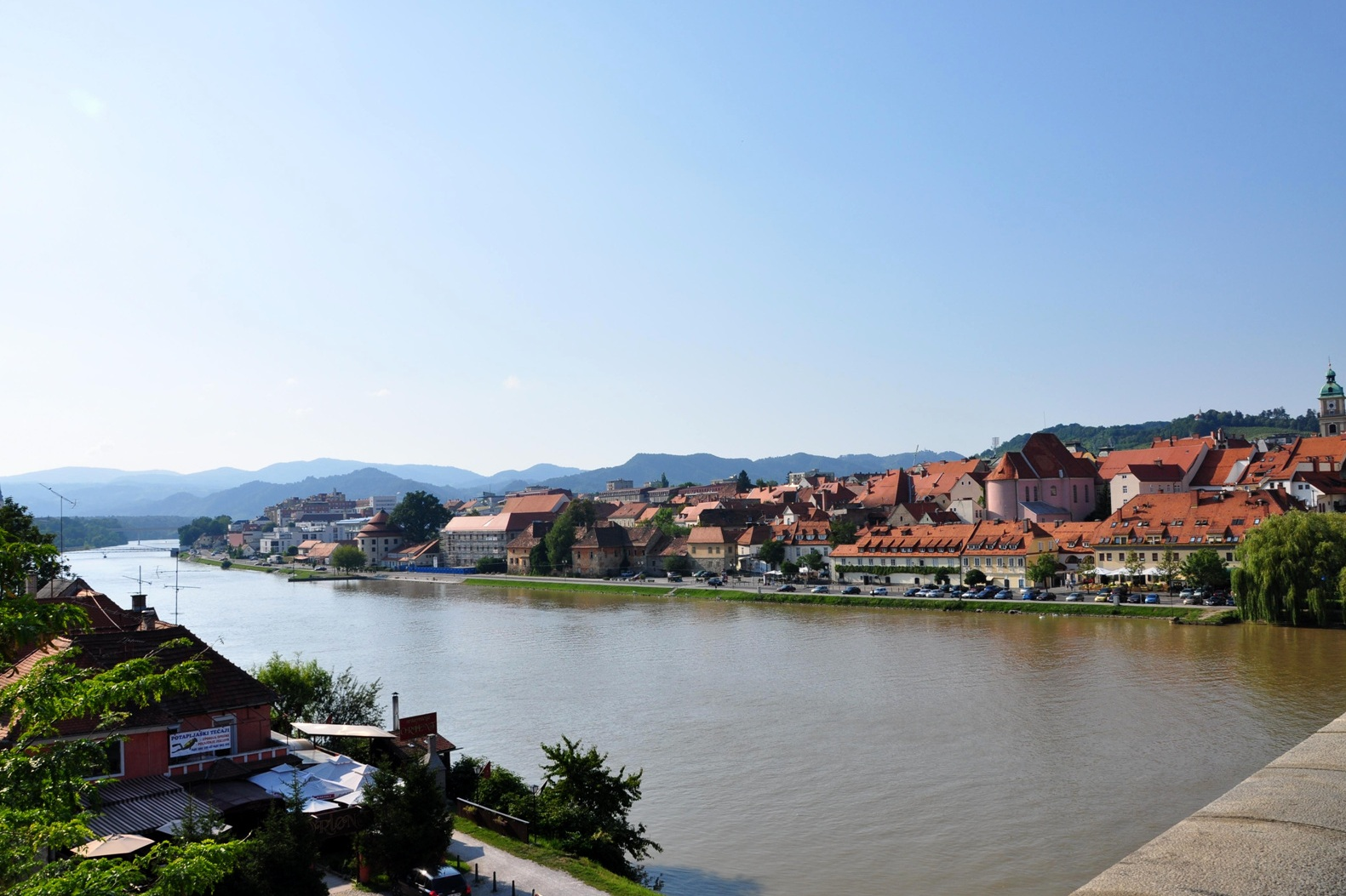
Maribor

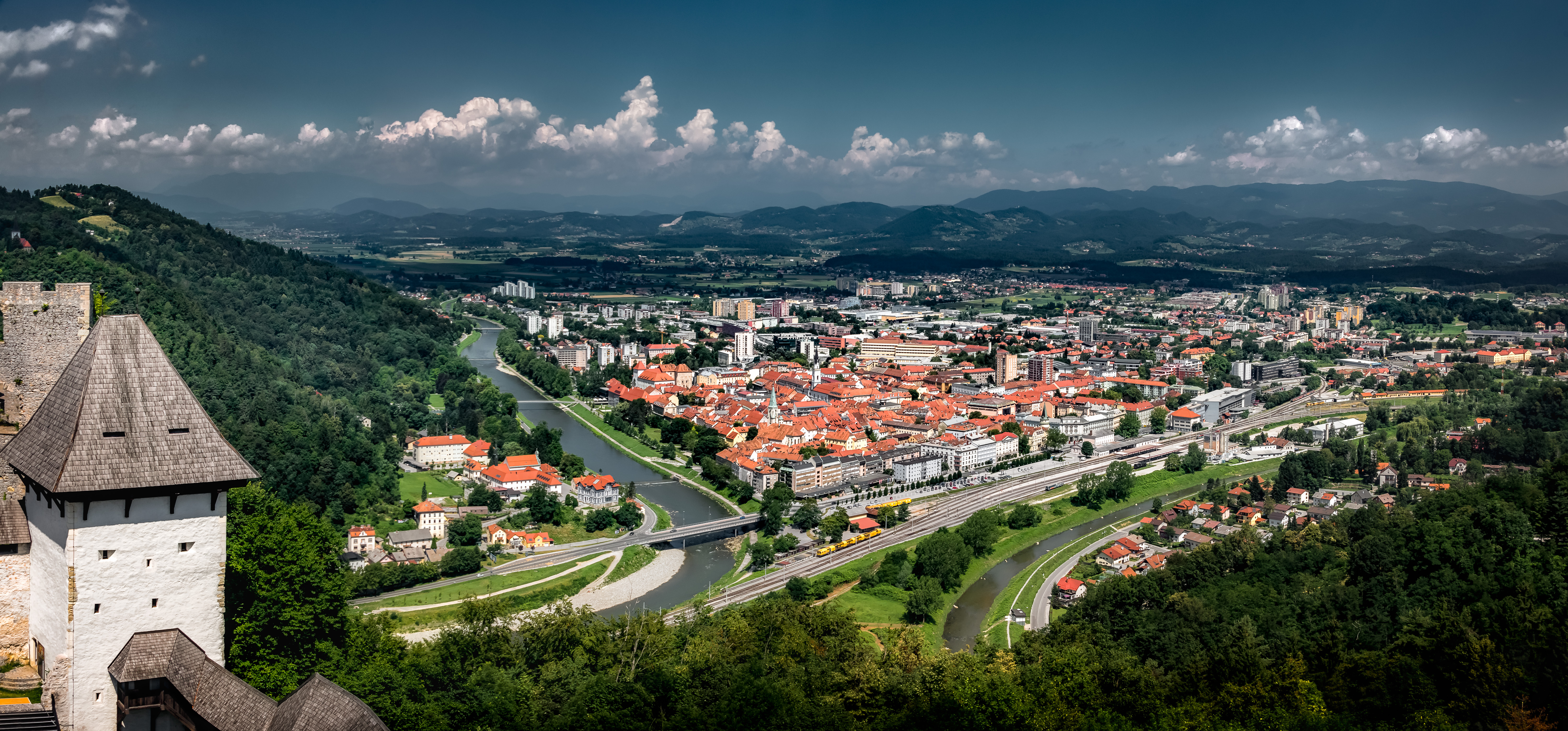
Celje

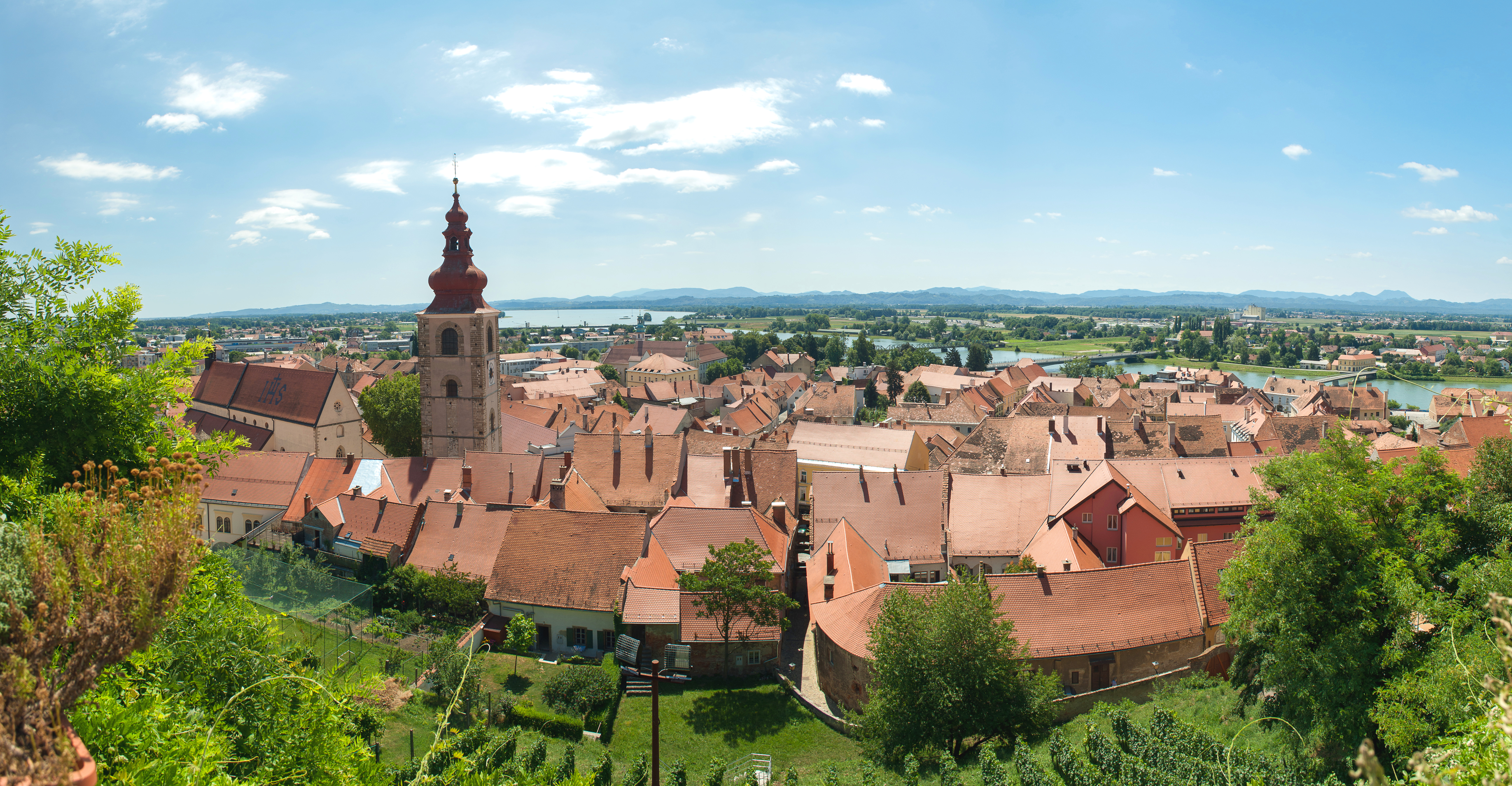
Ptuj

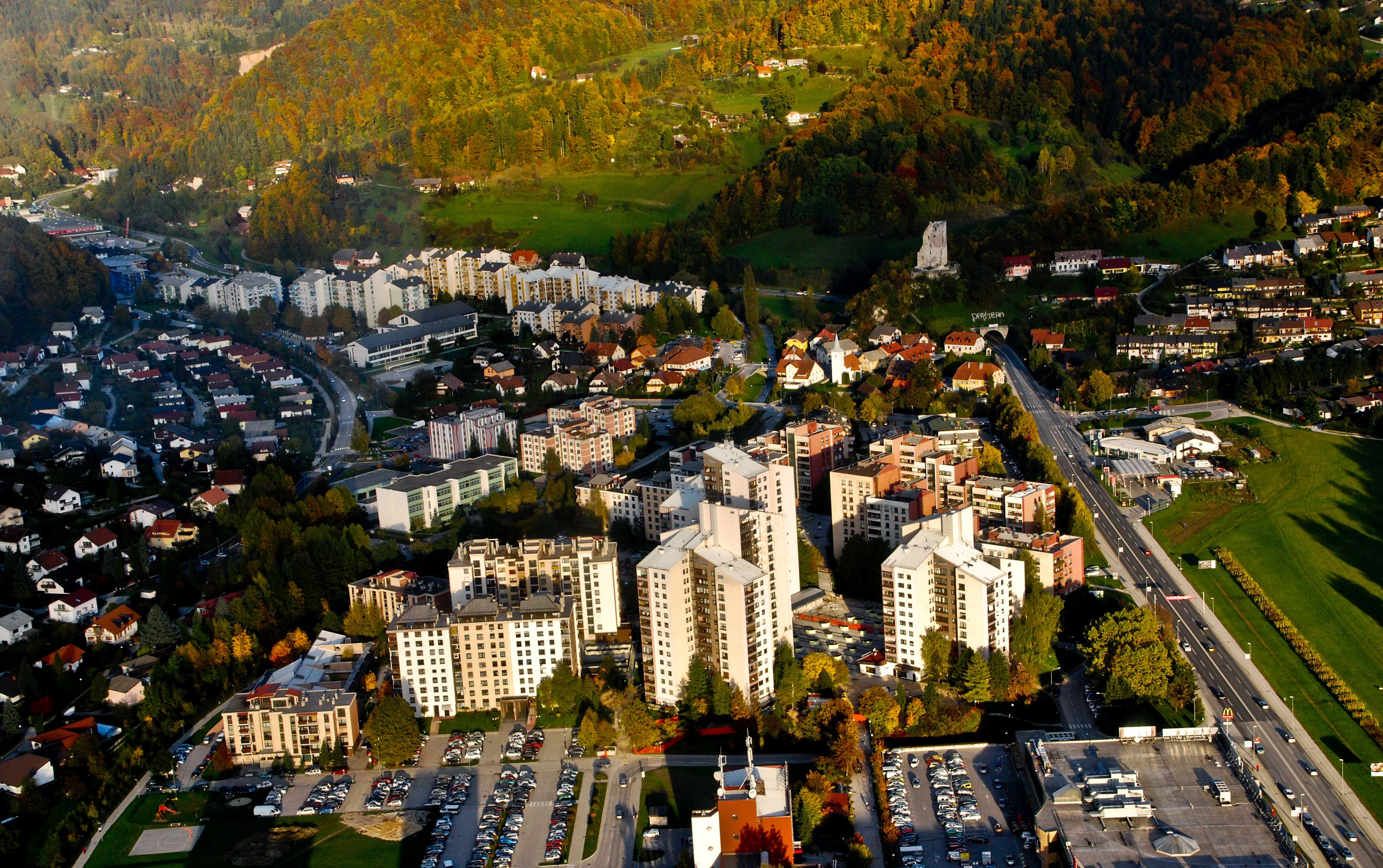
Velenje

== Tourism ==
Styria is known for its white wine, especially Ljutomer Riesling, for the Pohorje ski resort, for cultural festivals and for pumpkin seed oil. It is also known as a hop-growing area producing Styrian Goldings, a variety of the English aroma hop Fuggles.

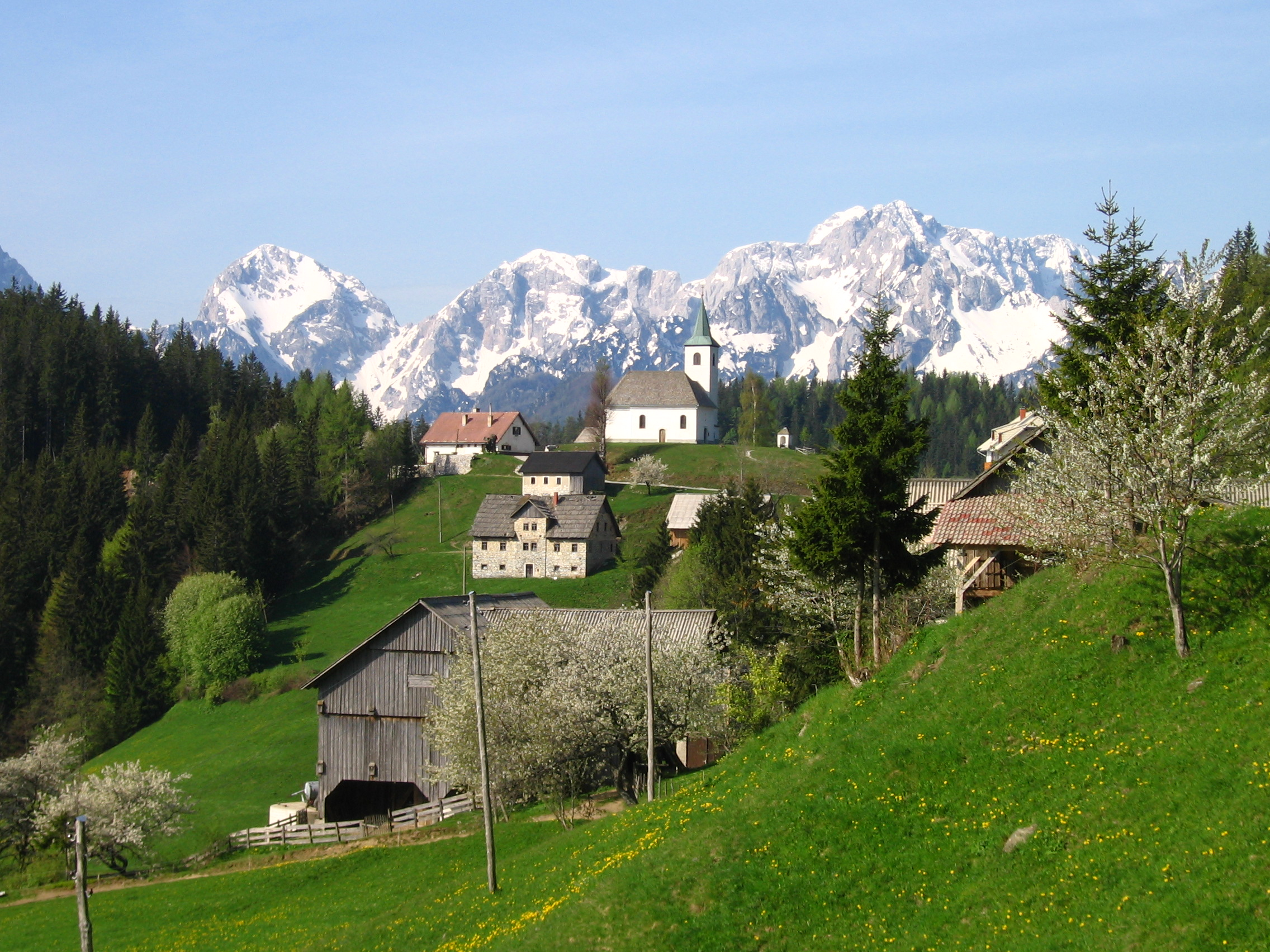
Savinja Alps from Podolševa

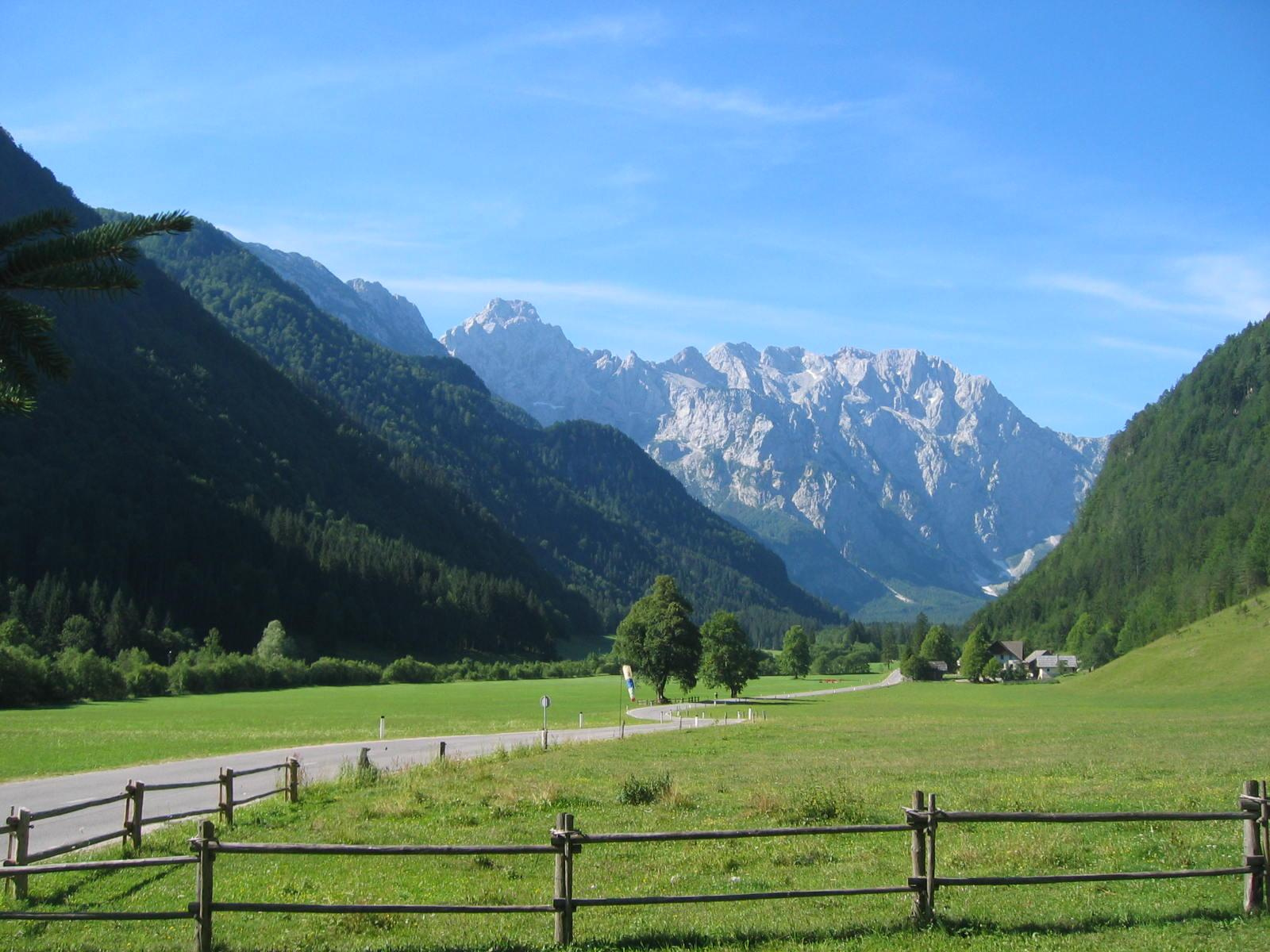
Logar Valley

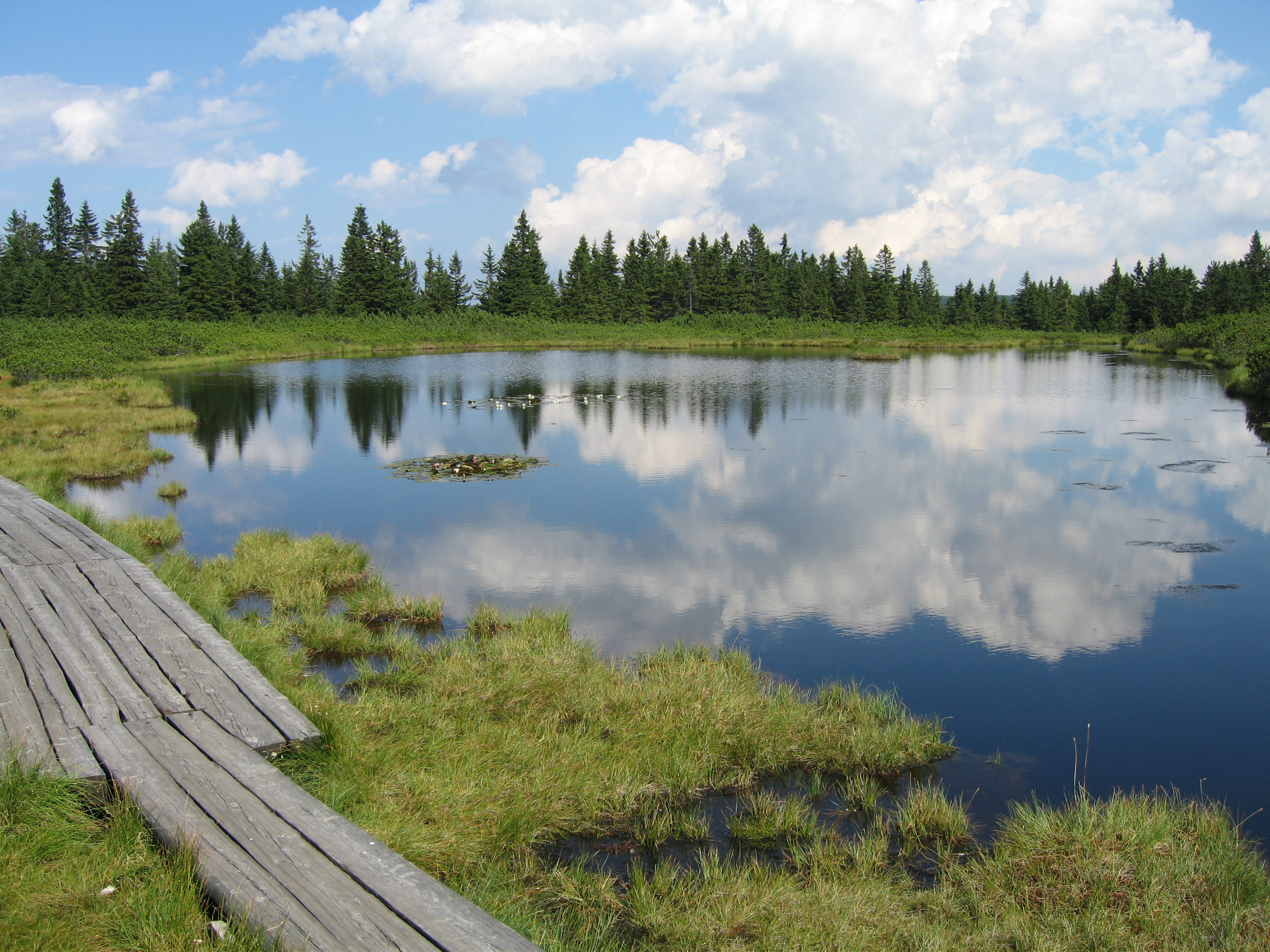
Lake Ribnica on the Pohorje hills

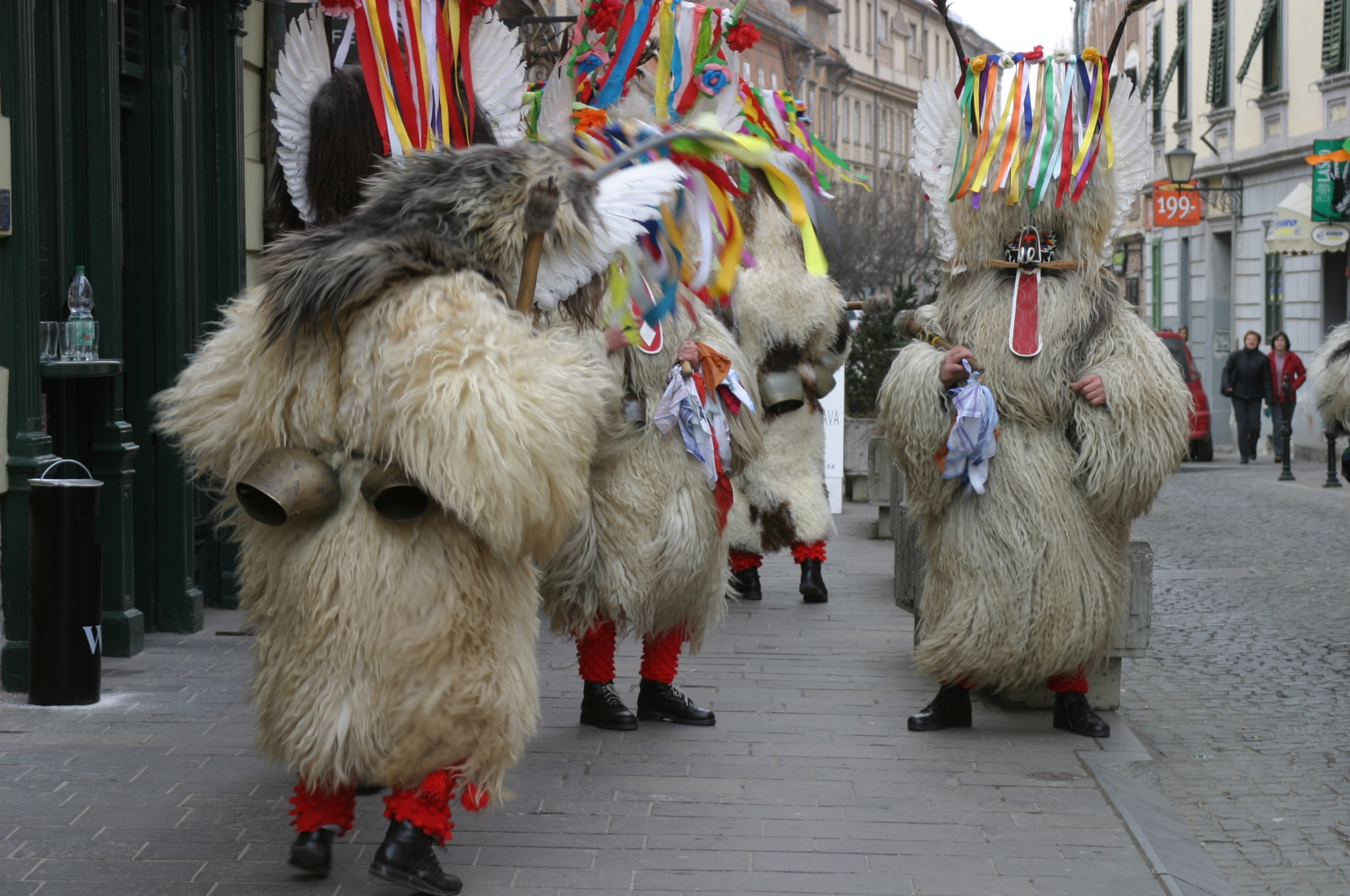
Kurentovanje festival in Ptuj

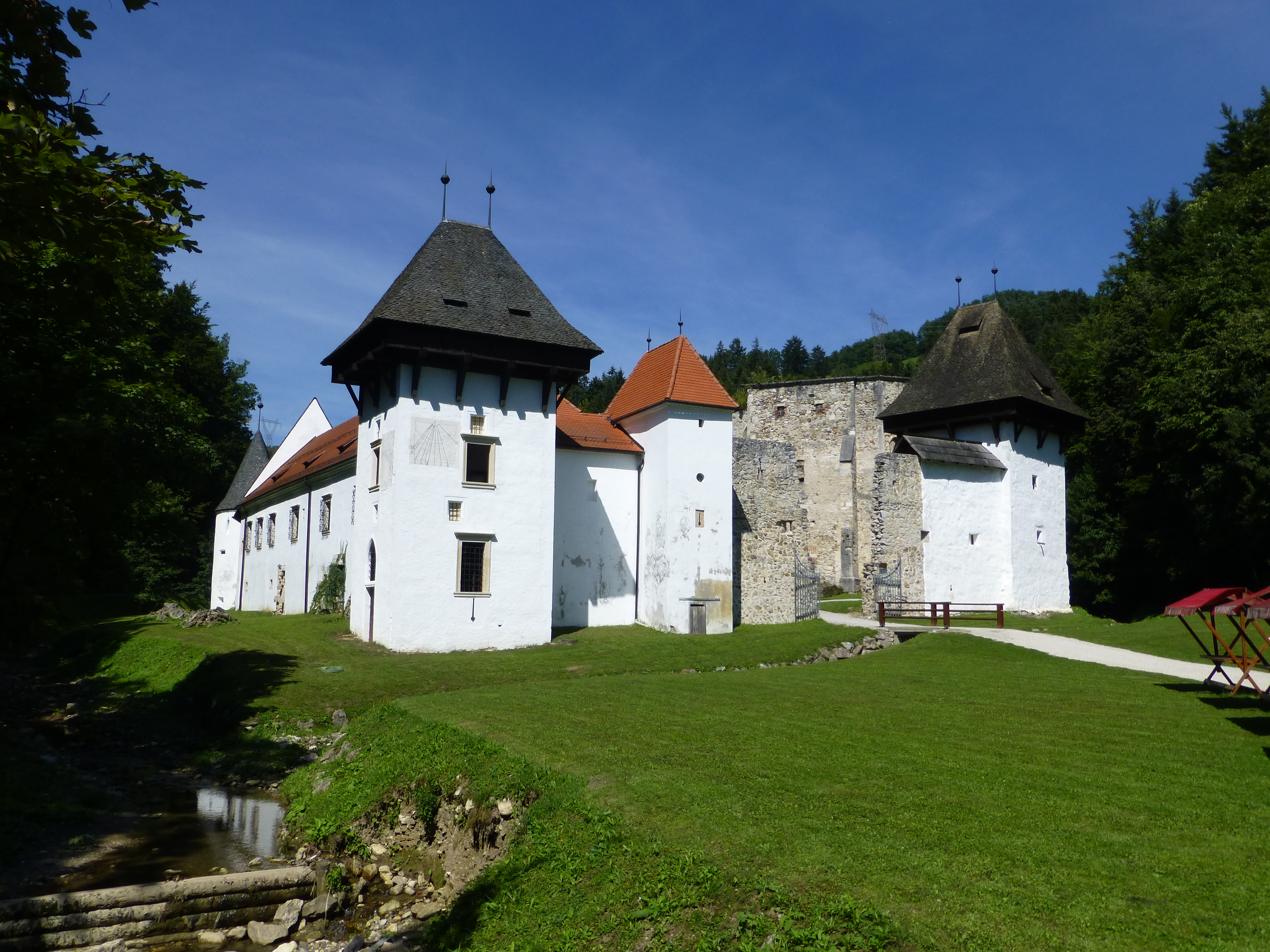
Žiče Charterhouse

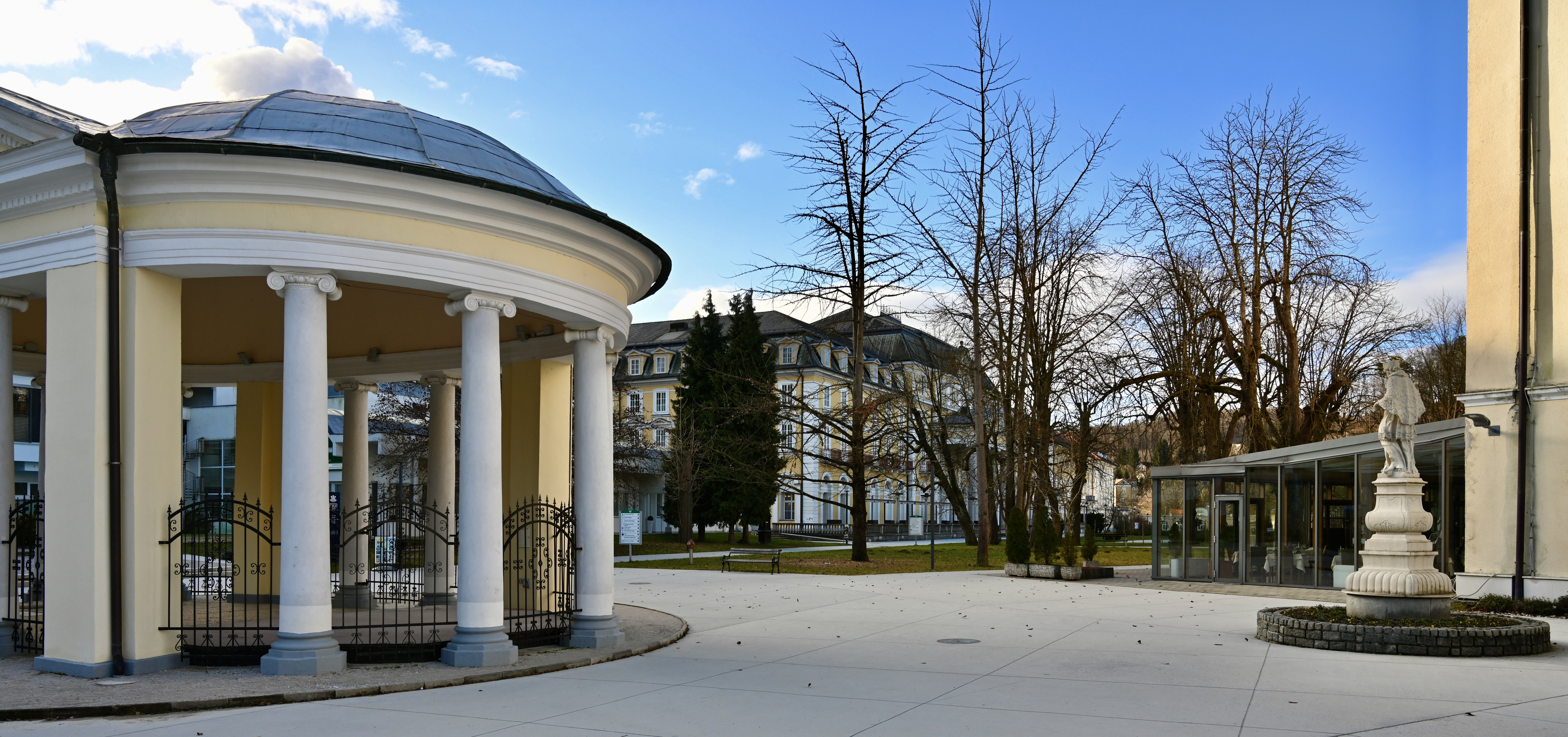
Rogaška Slatina Spa

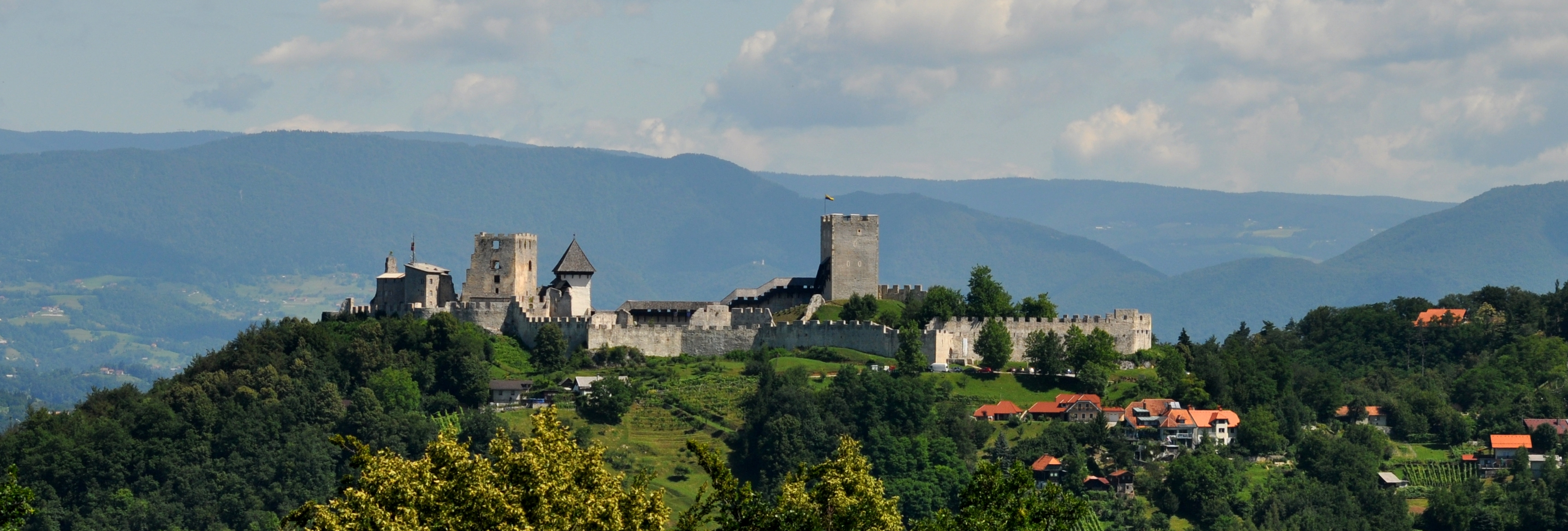
Celje Castle

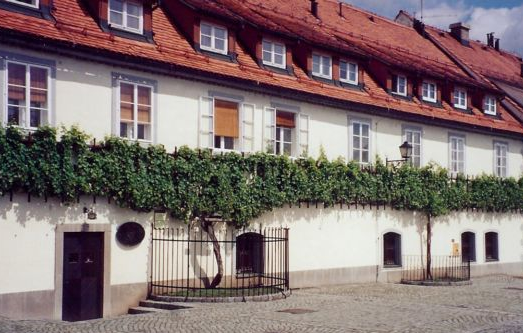
The oldest grape vine in the world in Maribor

== Prominent people ==
- Anton Aškerc, poet
- Jože Brilej, politician, diplomat and ambassador of Yugoslavia, politician, President of the United Nations Security Council, chief justice of the supreme court of Slovenia, World War II partisan war hero, editor of Ljudska pravica
- Marta Brilej, diplomat, partisan war hero, head of PR for tourism Yugoslavia, patron of the arts
- Aleš Čeh, football (soccer) player
- Jolanda Čeplak, athlete
- Peter Dajnko, philologist and poet
- Karel Destovnik Kajuh, poet
- Mladen Dolar, philosopher
- Janja Garnbret, rock climber
- Vekoslav Grmič, theologian
- Drago Jančar, writer
- Edvard Kocbek, writer, poet, and politician
- Anton Korošec, politician, Prime Minister of the Kingdom of Yugoslavia
- Janez Menart, poet
- Franz Miklosich, linguist
- Matija Murko, linguist and ethnographer
- Johann Puch, inventor, bicycle industry
- Žarko Petan, film and theatre director
- Herman Potočnik, electrical engineer and astronautics theorist
- Zoran Predin, singer-songwriter
- Jože Pučnik, dissident, politician and sociologist
- Benka Pulko, author and Guinness World Record setting motorcycle traveler
- Miha Remec, author
- Anton Martin Slomšek, Roman Catholic bishop
- Jože Snoj, poet
- Wilhelm von Tegetthoff, Austrian admiral
- Danilo Türk, President of Slovenia
- Beno Udrih, basketball player
- Josip Vošnjak, political activist
- Stanko Vraz, poet
- Windisch-Graetz, princely family
- Hugo Wolf, composer
- Zlatko Zahovič, football player
- Milan Zver, politician and political scientist

== See also ==
- History of Slovenia
- History of Styria
- Roman Catholic Diocese of Lavant
- Roman Catholic Archdiocese of Maribor
- Roman Catholic Diocese of Celje
- University of Maribor
- I. High School in Celje
- Savinja
- Rinka Falls
- Counts of Celje
