= Spodnji Kamenščak =

- Location in Slovenia
- Coordinates: 46°30′47.94″N 16°10′43.94″E
- Country: Slovenia
- Traditional region: Styria
- Statistical region: Mura
- Municipality: Ljutomer

Area
  - Total: 2.37 km^{2} (0.92 sq mi)
- Elevation: 222.2 m (729 ft)

Population (2002)
  - Total: 418

Spodnji Kamenščak (pronounced [ˈspoːdnji ˈkaːmɛnʃtʃak], German: Untersteinberg) is a settlement in the hills southwest of Ljutomer in northeastern Slovenia. The area belongs to the traditional region of Styria and is now included in the Mura Statistical Region.
