= Dobrava, Križevci =

Dobrava
- Location in Slovenia
- Coordinates: 46°34′31.44″N 16°5′50.07″E
- Country: Slovenia
- Traditional region: Styria
- Statistical region: Mura
- Municipality: Križevci

Area
  - Total: 3.26 km^{2} (1.26 sq mi)
- Elevation: 200.4 m (657 ft)

Population (2002)
  - Total: 53

Dobrava (pronounced [ˈdoːbɾaʋa]) is a small village southwest of Stara Nova Vas in the Municipality of Križevci in northeastern Slovenia. The area is part of the traditional region of Styria and is now included with the rest of the municipality in the Mura Statistical Region.

A small chapel in the settlement dates to 1899.

== See also ==
- Dobrava (toponym)
