= Jeruzalem, Ljutomer =

Jeruzalem
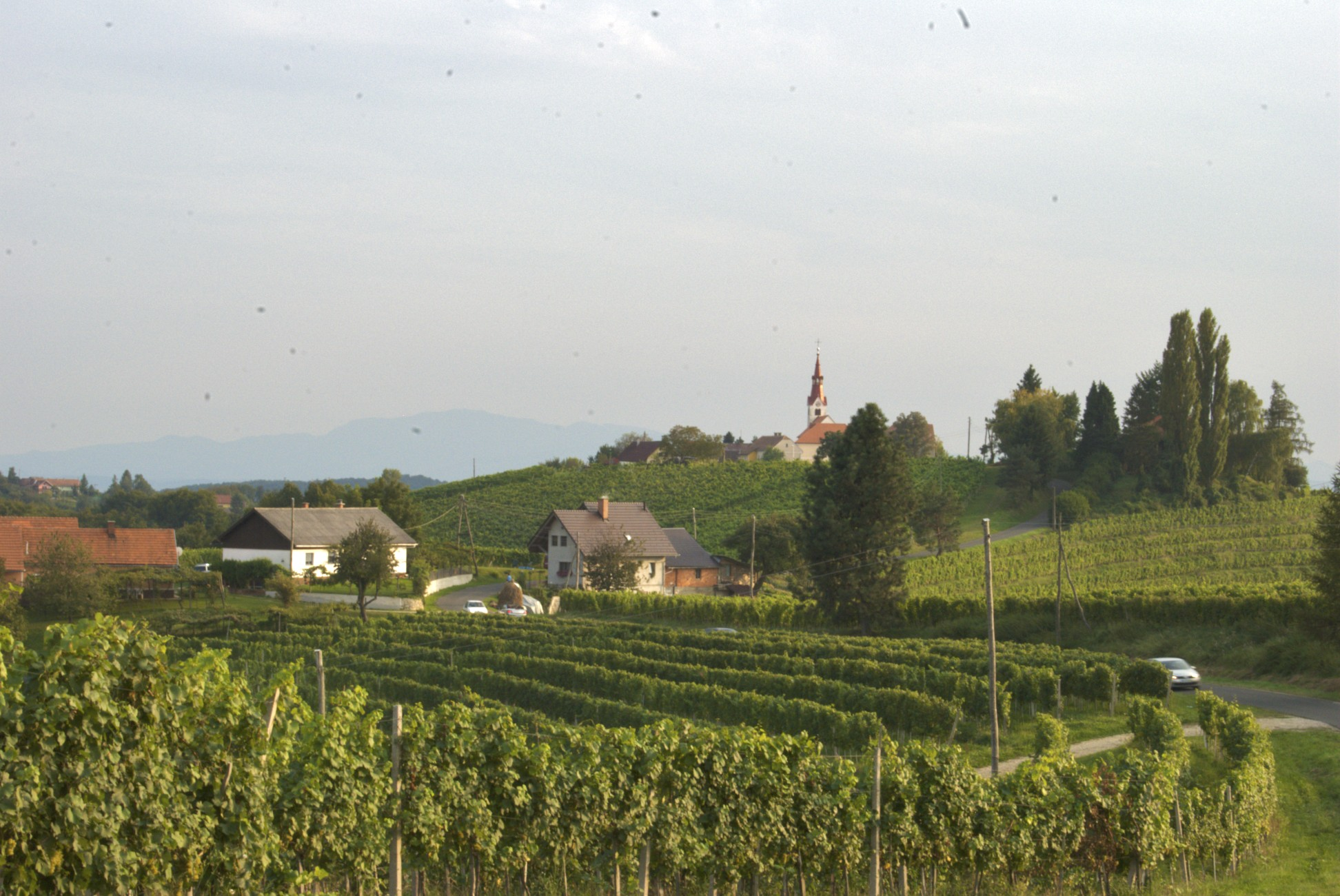

- Location in Slovenia
- Coordinates: 46°28′28.63″N 16°11′18.9″E
- Country: Slovenia
- Traditional region: Styria
- Statistical region: Mura
- Municipality: Ljutomer

Area
  - Total: 0.6 km^{2} (0.23 sq mi)
- Elevation: 328.5 m (1,078 ft)

Population (2002)
  - Total: 43

Jeruzalem (pronounced [jɛˈɾuːzalɛm]; German: Jerusalem) is a small settlement in the eastern part of the Slovene Hills (Slovene: Slovenske gorice) in the Municipality of Ljutomer in northeastern Slovenia. The area is part of the traditional region of Styria and is now included in the Mura Statistical Region.

== Name ==
Jeruzalem was attested in historical sources as Jerusalem between 1763 and 1787. The settlement was named after the city of Jerusalem because the Crusaders brought an icon of the Virgin Mary from Jerusalem to a chapel located there after Frederick of Pettau granted the area to the Crusaders in the 13th century.

== Church ==
The local church is a pilgrimage church dedicated to Mary of the Seven Sorrows. It belongs to the parish of Miklavž pri Ormožu. A chapel was built on the site in 1652. In the late 17th century, it was expanded by converting the chapel to the sanctuary and building a nave. In the 18th century, a belfry and a new chapel were added.

== Geography ==
Jeruzalem is a dispersed settlement in the hills between the Mur and the Drava, in a landscape that includes many vineyards as part of the Drava Winemaking Region. It lies at an elevation of approximately 341 m, 7 km south of Ljutomer and 9 km north of Ormož.
