= Podgradje =

- Location in Slovenia
- Coordinates: 46°30′25.67″N 16°12′40.26″E
- Country: Slovenia
- Traditional region: Styria
- Statistical region: Mura
- Municipality: Ljutomer

Area
  - Total: 1.66 km^{2} (0.64 sq mi)
- Elevation: 189.4 m (621 ft)

Population (2002)
  - Total: 294

Podgradje (pronounced [ˈpoːdɡɾadjɛ], German: Unterschloss) is a settlement immediately south of Ljutomer in northeastern Slovenia. The area is part of the traditional region of Styria and is now included in the Mura Statistical Region.

On a hill south of the settlement stands a three-storey mansion known as Vard Castle (Slovene: Vardov grad). It was built between 1859 and 1862 on the site of a castle that was first mentioned in written documents dating to 1242. North of the mansion is the local church, dedicated to Saint Anne. It belongs to the Parish of Ljutomer. It was mentioned in documents dating to 1545 and was extensively rebuilt in 1736 and a belfry was added in the 1930s.
