= Mekotnjak =

- Location in Slovenia
- Coordinates: 46°30′28.35″N 16°8′52.81″E
- Country: Slovenia
- Traditional region: Styria
- Statistical region: Mura
- Municipality: Ljutomer

Area
  - Total: 2.73 km^{2} (1.05 sq mi)
- Elevation: 286.2 m (939 ft)

Population (2002)
  - Total: 204

Mekotnjak (pronounced [mɛkɔtˈnjaːk]) is a small settlement in the hills southwest of Ljutomer in northeastern Slovenia. The area belongs to the traditional Styria region and is now included in the Mura Statistical Region.
