= Vidanovci =

- Location in Slovenia
- Coordinates: 46°30′27.8″N 16°7′4.9″E
- Country: Slovenia
- Traditional region: Styria
- Statistical region: Mura
- Municipality: Ljutomer

Area
  - Total: 1.64 km^{2} (0.63 sq mi)
- Elevation: 226.9 m (744 ft)

Population (2002)
  - Total: 44

Vidanovci (pronounced [ˈʋiːdanɔu̯tsi]) is a small settlement in the Slovene Hills (Slovene: Slovenske gorice) west of Ljutomer in northeastern Slovenia. The area belongs to the traditional Styria region and is now included in the Mura Statistical Region.
