= Municipality of Ljutomer =

Municipality of Slovenia

Municipality of Ljutomer Občina Ljutomer
- Municipality
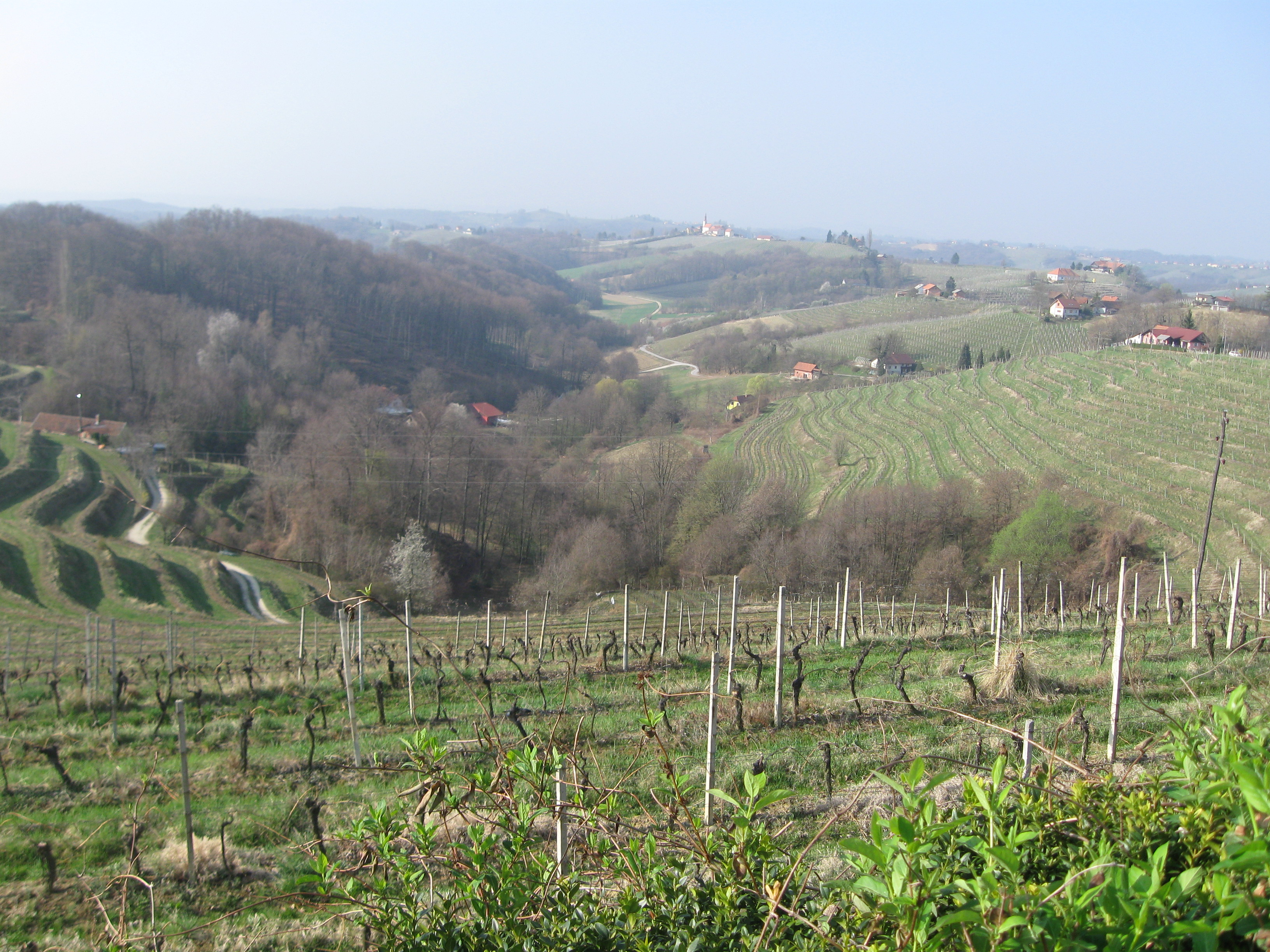

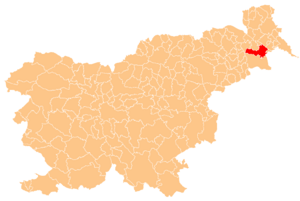
- Location of the Municipality of Ljutomer in Slovenia
- Coordinates: 46°31′N 16°12′E
- Country: Slovenia

Government
  - Mayor: Olga Karba (Independent)

Area
  - Total: 107.2 km^{2} (41.4 sq mi)

Population (2002)
  - Total: 11,720
  - Density: 109.3/km^{2} (283.2/sq mi)
- Time zone: UTC+01 (CET)
  - Summer (DST): UTC+02 (CEST)
- Website: www.ljutomer.si

The Municipality of Ljutomer (pronounced [ˈljuːtɔmɛɾ]; Slovene: Občina Ljutomer) is a municipality in northeastern Slovenia, some 40 kilometers (25 mi) east of Maribor. Traditionally it was part of the region of Styria. It is now included in the Mura Statistical Region. Its largest settlement and the administrative seat is Ljutomer. It borders Croatia.

== Geography ==
The municipality includes Ljutomer Ponds–Jeruzalem Hills Nature Park (Slovene: Krajinski park Ljutomerski ribniki – Jeruzalemske gorice), which covers 1,346 hectares (3,330 acres).

=== Settlements ===
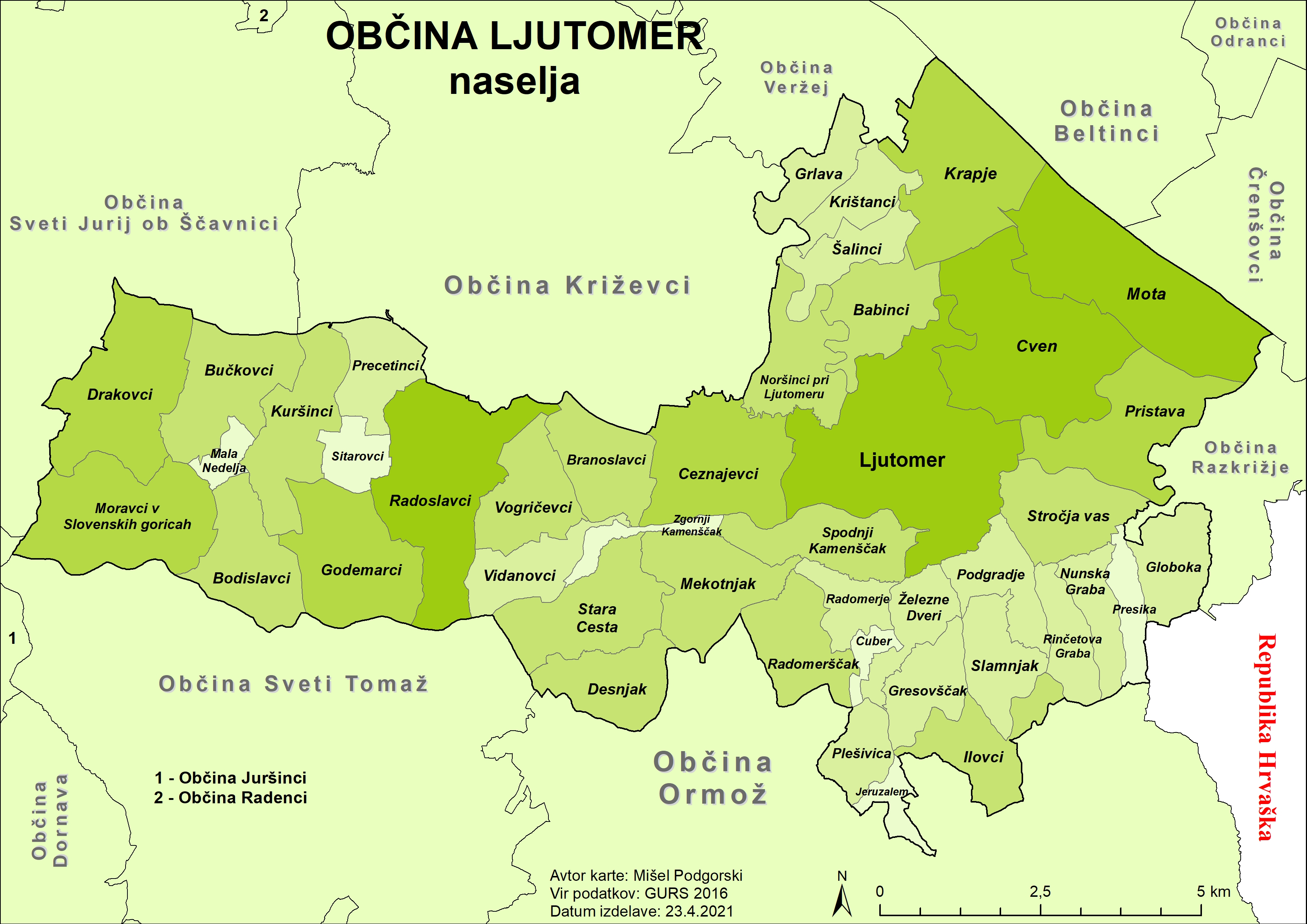
Villages in the municipality

In addition to the municipal seat of Ljutomer, the municipality also includes the following settlements:

- Babinci
- Bodislavci
- Branoslavci
- Bučkovci
- Cezanjevci
- Cuber
- Cven
- Desnjak
- Drakovci
- Globoka
- Godemarci
- Gresovščak
- Grlava
- Ilovci
- Jeruzalem
- Krapje
- Krištanci
- Kuršinci
- Mala Nedelja
- Mekotnjak
- Moravci v Slovenskih Goricah
- Mota
- Noršinci pri Ljutomeru
- Nunska Graba
- Plešivica
- Podgradje
- Precetinci
- Presika
- Pristava
- Radomerje
- Radomerščak
- Radoslavci
- Rinčetova Graba
- Šalinci
- Sitarovci
- Slamnjak
- Spodnji Kamenščak
- Stara Cesta
- Stročja Vas
- Vidanovci
- Vogričevci
- Železne Dveri
- Zgornji Kamenščak

== Notable people ==
The Ljutomer area was the birthplace of the ethnologist and Romantic poet Stanko Vraz (1810–1851), linguist Franz Miklosich (1813–1891), pioneer of film making Karol Grossmann (1864–1929), and painter Ante Trstenjak (1894–1970).
