= Desnjak =

- Location in Slovenia
- Coordinates: 46°29′30.35″N 16°7′49.68″E
- Country: Slovenia
- Traditional region: Styria
- Statistical region: Mura
- Municipality: Ljutomer

Area
  - Total: 2.02 km^{2} (0.78 sq mi)
- Elevation: 292 m (958 ft)

Population (2002)
  - Total: 141

Desnjak (pronounced [ˈdeːsnjak]) is a settlement in the eastern Slovene Hills (Slovene: Slovenske gorice) in the Municipality of Ljutomer in northeastern Slovenia. The area is part of the traditional region of Styria and is now included in the Mura Statistical Region.

There is a small chapel-shrine in the settlement is dedicated to the Virgin Mary. It belongs to the Parish of Cezanjevci. It was built in 1889 and renovated in 1994.
