= Lukavci =

- Location in Slovenia
- Coordinates: 46°32′28.07″N 16°9′20.17″E
- Country: Slovenia
- Traditional region: Styria
- Statistical region: Mura
- Municipality: Križevci

Area
  - Total: 5.26 km^{2} (2.03 sq mi)
- Elevation: 178.6 m (586 ft)

Population (2002)
  - Total: 586

Lukavci (pronounced [luˈkaːu̯tsi], in older sources Lokavci, German: Lukafzen) is a village in the Municipality of Križevci in northeastern Slovenia. It lies just off the regional road leading northwest from Ljutomer to Radenci. The area is part of the traditional region of Styria. The entire municipality is now included in the Mura Statistical Region.

A small Neo-Gothic chapel in the settlement was built in 1872.
