= Slamnjak =

- Location in Slovenia
- Coordinates: 46°29′39.6″N 16°12′47.68″E
- Country: Slovenia
- Traditional region: Styria
- Statistical region: Mura
- Municipality: Ljutomer

Area
  - Total: 1.71 km^{2} (0.66 sq mi)
- Elevation: 236 m (774 ft)

Population (2002)
  - Total: 173

Slamnjak (pronounced [ˈslaːmnjak], German: Kummersberg) is a small settlement in the hills south of Ljutomer in northeastern Slovenia. The area belongs to the traditional Styria region and is now included in the Mura Statistical Region.

The painter Ante Trstenjak was born in the village in 1894.
