= Berkovski Prelogi =

- Location in Slovenia
- Coordinates: 46°33′31.67″N 16°5′34.31″E
- Country: Slovenia
- Traditional region: Styria
- Statistical region: Mura
- Municipality: Križevci

Area
  - Total: 2.28 km^{2} (0.88 sq mi)
- Elevation: 194.5 m (638 ft)

Population (2002)
  - Total: 38

Berkovski Prelogi (pronounced [bɛɾˈkoːu̯ski ˈpɾeːlɔɡi]) is a small settlement just north of Berkovci in the Municipality of Križevci in northeastern Slovenia. The area is part of the traditional region of Styria. The entire municipality is now included in the Mura Statistical Region.
