= Graba =

Graba is a surname. Notable people with the surname include:

- Carl Julian (von) Graba (1799–1874), German lawyer and ornithologist who visited and studied the Faroe Islands
- Jeff Graba (born 1968), American college gymnastics coach
- Jerome Clifford Graba (1928–2004), American politician and farmer
- Graba' (1940–2016), Belgian artist, who created mainly paintings and jewellery

== See also ==
- Erbessa graba, moth of the family Notodontidae
- Nunska Graba, settlement in the hills southeast of Ljutomer in northeastern Slovenia
- Rinčetova Graba, settlement in the hills southeast of Ljutomer in northeastern Slovenia
