= Železne Dveri =

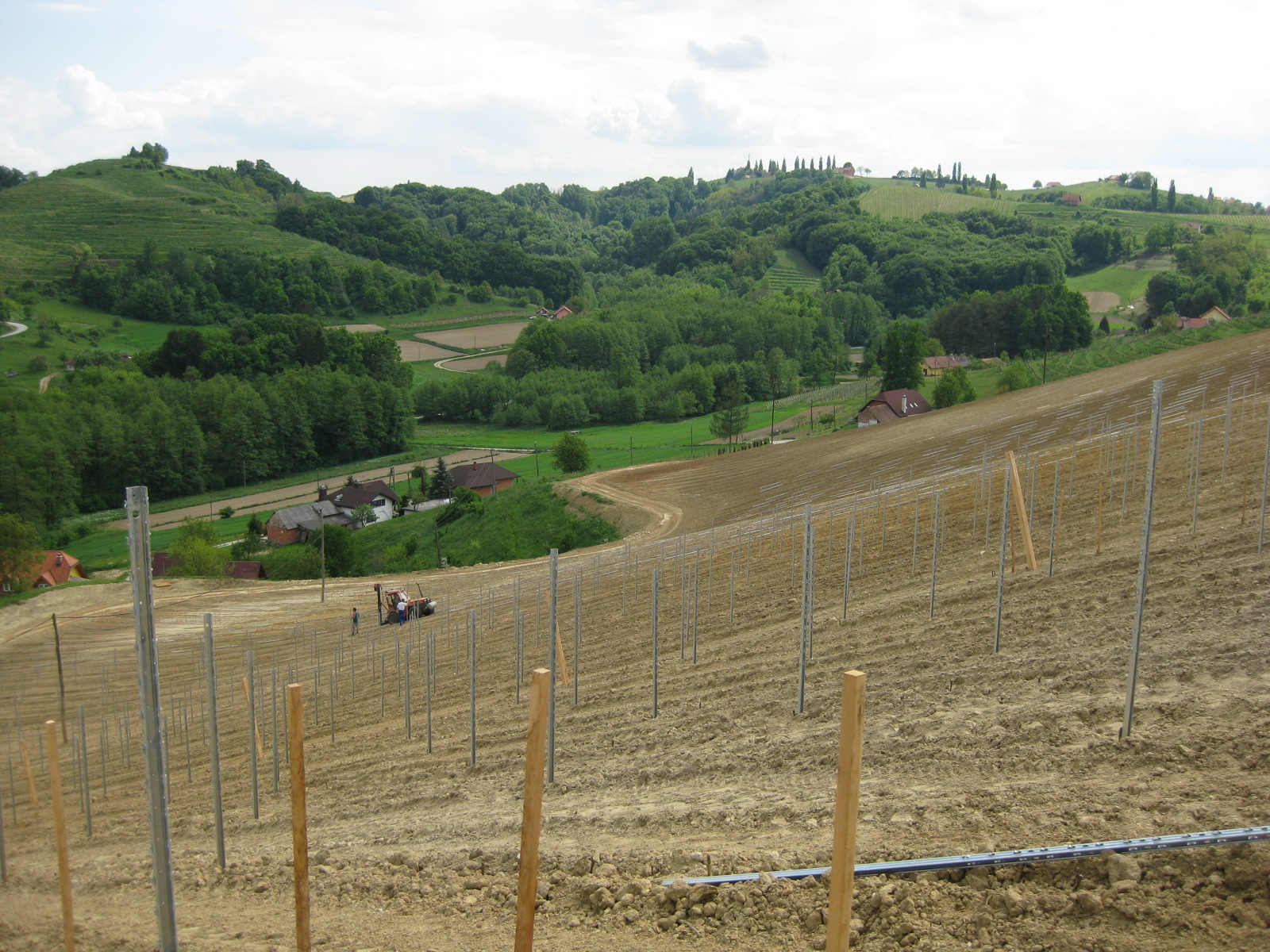

- Location in Slovenia
- Coordinates: 46°29′52.61″N 16°11′41.37″E
- Country: Slovenia
- Traditional region: Styria
- Statistical region: Mura
- Municipality: Ljutomer

Area
  - Total: 1.36 km^{2} (0.53 sq mi)
- Elevation: 257.2 m (844 ft)

Population (2002)
  - Total: 49

Železne Dveri (pronounced [ʒɛˈleːznɛ ˈdʋɛːɾi] or [ʒɛˈleːznɛ ˈdʋeːɾi], German: Eisenthür) is a settlement in the hills south of Ljutomer in northeastern Slovenia. The area belongs to the traditional Styria region and is now included in the Mura Statistical Region.

== Landmarks ==
There is a Baroque mansion in the settlement. It was built after 1751 on the site of an earlier building.

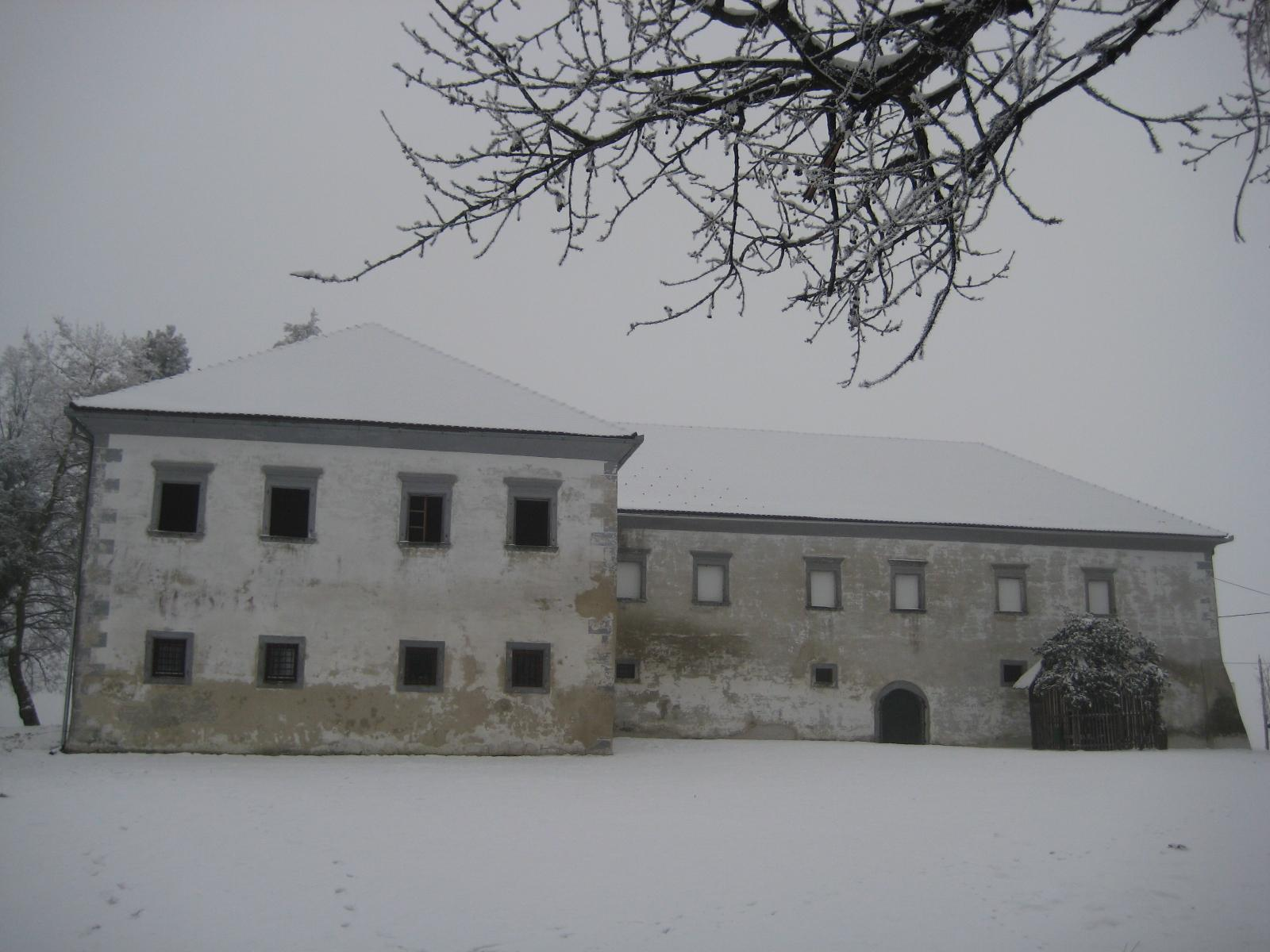
Železne Dveri Mansion
