= Josip Križan =

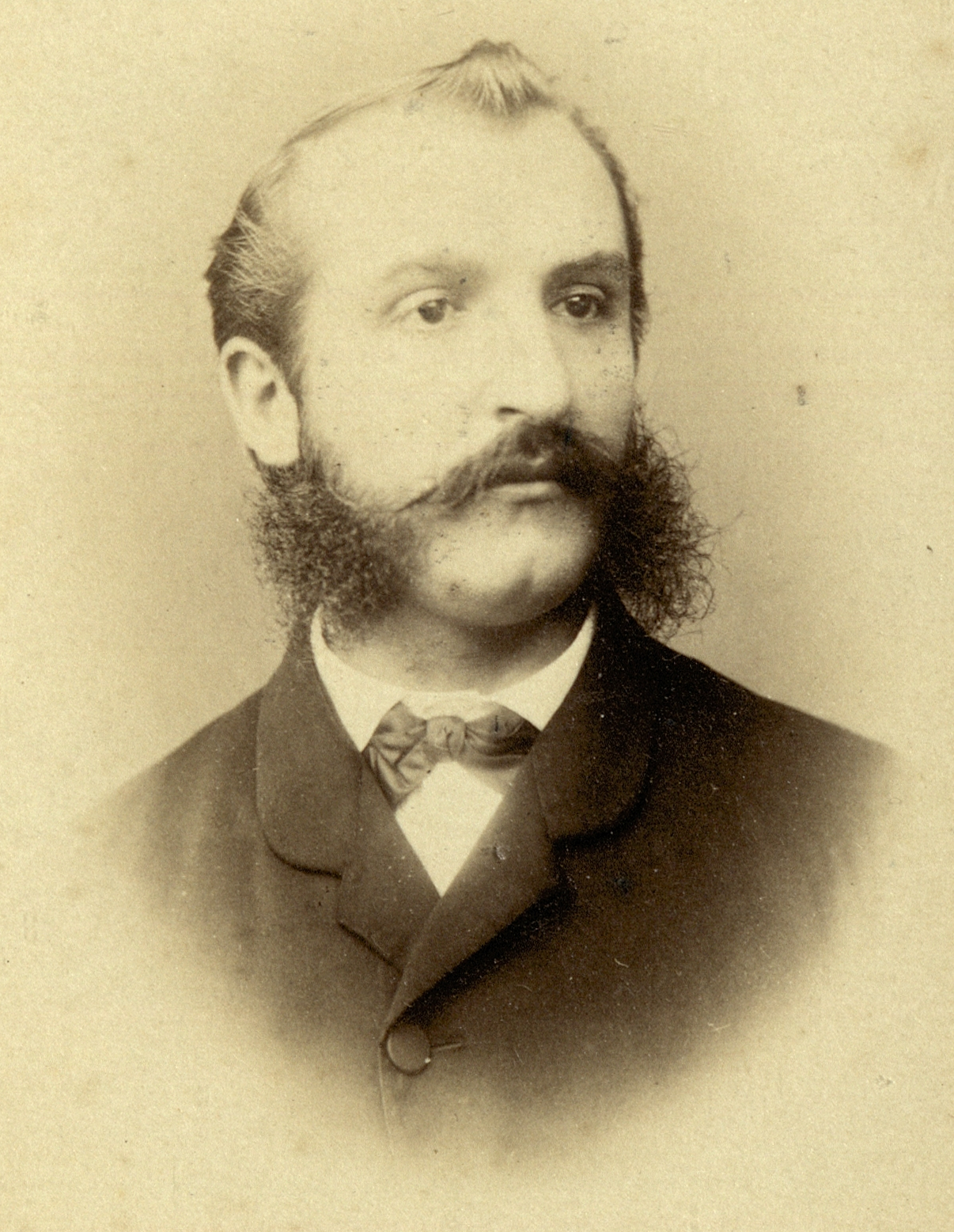
- Born: December 31, 1841; Kokoriči, Duchy of Styria, Austrian Empire
- Died: July 16, 1921 (aged 79); Varaždin, Province of Croatia & Slavonia, Kingdom of Serbs, Croats and Slovenes
- Occupation(s): Mathematician, physicist, astronomer, philosopher

Josip Križan (December 31, 1841 in Kokoriči – July 16, 1921 in Varaždin, Croatia) was a slovenian mathematician, physicist, philosopher and astronomer.

He studied mathematics, physics and philosophy in Graz, Austria-Hungary and between 1867 and 1869 obtained a doctorate to become a professor.

== Sources ==
- Slovenian Wikipedia
