= Moravci =

Moravci may refer to:

In Serbia:

- Moravci (Ljig), a settlement in the municipality of Ljig

In Slovenia:

- Moravci v Slovenskih Goricah, a settlement in the municipality of Ljutomer
- Moravske Toplice, a settlement in the municipality of Moravske Toplice (known as Moravci until 1983)
