= Stara Nova Vas =

- Location in Slovenia
- Coordinates: 46°34′54.72″N 16°6′57.71″E
- Country: Slovenia
- Traditional region: Styria
- Statistical region: Mura
- Municipality: Križevci

Area
  - Total: 2.72 km^{2} (1.05 sq mi)
- Elevation: 188.9 m (620 ft)

Population (2024)
  - Total: 334

Stara Nova Vas (pronounced [ˈstaːɾa ˈnɔːʋa ˈʋaːs]; Slovene: Stara Nova vas, in older sources Stara Nova ves, German: Altneudorf) is a village in the Municipality of Križevci in northeastern Slovenia. It lies on the regional road from Ljutomer to Radenci in the traditional region of Styria. The entire municipality is now included in the Mura Statistical Region.

== Name ==
The name Stara Nova vas literally means 'old new village'. Today's village is an amalgamation of two previously separate villages: Stara vas (literally, 'old village') and Nova vas (literally, 'new village'). Although Stara Vas is the older of the two villages, Nova Vas first appeared by name in historical records in 1443. The village is marked on older maps as Stara i nova ves (literally, 'old and new village'). In the local dialect, the settlement is known as Stara Nova ves.

== Chapel ==
A small Neo-Gothic chapel in the settlement was built in 1805 and renovated in 1982.
