= Šalinci =

Settlement in northeastern Slovenia

- Location in Slovenia
- Coordinates: 46°32′39.27″N 16°10′21.47″E
- Country: Slovenia
- Traditional region: Styria
- Statistical region: Mura
- Municipality: Ljutomer

Area
  - Total: 1.44 km^{2} (0.56 sq mi)
- Elevation: 178.2 m (585 ft)

Population (2002)
  - Total: 175

Šalinci (pronounced [ˈʃaːlintsi]) is a settlement in the Municipality of Ljutomer in northeastern Slovenia. The area belongs to the traditional region of Styria and is now included in the Mura Statistical Region.
