= Noršinci =

Noršinci is a place name that may refer to:

- Noršinci, Moravske Toplice, a village in Prekmurje, Slovenia
- Noršinci pri Ljutomeru, a village in the Slovene Styria, Slovenia
