= Globoka =

- Location in Slovenia
- Coordinates: 46°30′17.39″N 16°14′57.52″E
- Country: Slovenia
- Traditional region: Zala County, Kingdom of Hungary
- Statistical region: Mura
- Municipality: Ljutomer

Area
  - Total: 1.75 km^{2} (0.68 sq mi)
- Elevation: 246.1 m (807 ft)

Population (2002)
  - Total: 176

Globoka (pronounced [ɡlɔˈboːka] or [ɡlɔˈbɔːka]) is a settlement in the hills above the right bank of the Ščavnica River in the Municipality of Ljutomer in northeastern Slovenia, adjacent to the border with Croatia. The area traditionally belonged to the Zala County in the Kingdom of Hungary and is now included in the Mura Statistical Region.

There is a Neo-Gothic chapel in the settlement that is dedicated to Saint Mary of the Angels. It was built in 1896.
