= Bučečovci =

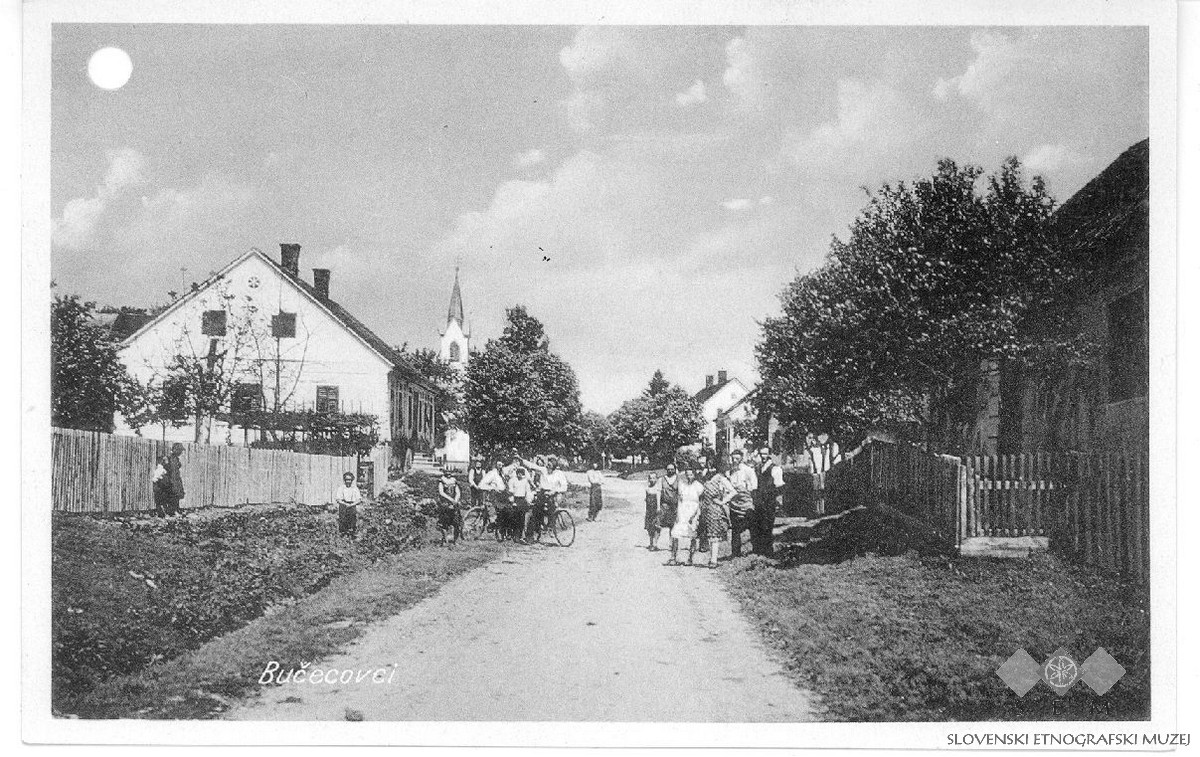
- Postcard of Bučečovci

- Location in Slovenia
- Coordinates: 46°35′15.55″N 16°6′17.27″E
- Country: Slovenia
- Traditional region: Styria
- Statistical region: Mura
- Municipality: Križevci

Area
  - Total: 4.39 km^{2} (1.69 sq mi)
- Elevation: 191.5 m (628 ft)

Population (2002)
  - Total: 268

Bučečovci (pronounced [butʃɛˈtʃoːu̯tsi], German: Wudischofzen) is a village in the Municipality of Križevci in northeastern Slovenia. The area is part of the traditional region of Styria. It is now included with the rest of the municipality in the Mura Statistical Region.

A small Neo-Gothic chapel in the settlement was built in 1890.
