= Moravci v Slovenskih Goricah =

- Location in Slovenia
- Coordinates: 46°30′53.68″N 16°2′33.79″E
- Country: Slovenia
- Traditional region: Styria
- Statistical region: Mura
- Municipality: Ljutomer

Area
  - Total: 4.32 km^{2} (1.67 sq mi)
- Elevation: 228.6 m (750 ft)

Population (2002)
  - Total: 385

Moravci v Slovenskih Goricah (pronounced [mɔˈɾaːu̯tsi ʍ slɔˈʋeːnskiɣ ɡɔˈɾiːtsax]; Slovene: Moravci v Slovenskih goricah) is a settlement in the Slovene Hills (Slovenske gorice) southwest of Ljutomer in northeastern Slovenia. The area is part of the traditional region of Styria and is now included in the Mura Statistical Region.

== Name ==
The name of the settlement was changed from Moravci to Moravci v Slovenskih goricah in 1955.

== Cultural heritage ==
The local chapel is a late-19th-century Neo-Gothic building erected on the foundations of an older plague column.
