= Sitarovci =

- Location in Slovenia
- Coordinates: 46°31′19.91″N 16°4′53.65″E
- Country: Slovenia
- Traditional region: Styria
- Statistical region: Mura
- Municipality: Ljutomer

Area
  - Total: 0.95 km^{2} (0.37 sq mi)
- Elevation: 193.8 m (636 ft)

Population (2002)
  - Total: 31

Sitarovci (pronounced [ˈsiːtaɾɔu̯tsi]) is a small settlement in the Municipality of Ljutomer in northeastern Slovenia. The area belongs to the traditional Styria region and is now included in the Mura Statistical Region.
