= Precetinci =

- Location in Slovenia
- Coordinates: 46°32′20.58″N 16°5′17.39″E
- Country: Slovenia
- Traditional region: Styria
- Statistical region: Mura
- Municipality: Ljutomer

Area
  - Total: 1.67 km^{2} (0.64 sq mi)
- Elevation: 244.3 m (802 ft)

Population (2002)
  - Total: 158

Precetinci (pronounced [pɾɛˈtseːtintsi]) is a settlement in the Municipality of Ljutomer in northeastern Slovenia. The area belongs to the traditional region of Styria and is now included in the Mura Statistical Region.

The local chapel is dedicated to Our Lady of the Rosary and was built between 1854 and 1856. The belfry was added in 1939.
