= Branoslavci =

- Location in Slovenia
- Coordinates: 46°31′29.06″N 16°7′32.91″E
- Country: Slovenia
- Traditional region: Styria
- Statistical region: Mura
- Municipality: Ljutomer

Area
  - Total: 2.19 km^{2} (0.85 sq mi)
- Elevation: 184.9 m (607 ft)

Population (2002)
  - Total: 163

Branoslavci (pronounced [ˈbɾaːnɔslau̯tsi], German: Malleggendorf) is a village in the Municipality of Ljutomer in northeastern Slovenia. The area is part of the traditional region of Styria and is now included in the Mura Statistical Region.

There is a small Neo-Gothic chapel in the centre of the village. It was built in the late 19th century.

In the south of the settlement is a large mansion known as Branek Castle (Slovene: Grad Branek). The surviving building is a two-storey early 20th-century adaptation after a major fire in 1925 of what was a 16th-century castle, which had in turn developed on the site of a tower of an early Slavic defence enclosure.
