= János Murkovics =

Slovene teacher, musician and writer

János Murkovics (Slovene: Janez Murkovič, Prekmurje Slovene: Janoš Murkovič, December 23, 1839 – April 15, 1917) was a Slovene teacher, musician, and writer in Hungary.

He was born near Ljutomer, in Bučkovci. He studied in Germany. In 1862 he relocated to Beltinci, at that time in Hungary. In 1871 wrote the school primer Abecednik; this was the first Prekmurje Slovene book written in the Gaj's Latin alphabet.

Murkovics worked in Trbovlje from 1878 to 1880, and by 1880 was in Hungary again, in Lendava. In 1910, he retired in Lendavske Gorice, where he later died.

== See also ==
- List of Slovene writers and poets in Hungary

== Sources ==
- Zgodovina šole v Beltincih
- Pokrajinski muzej Murska Sobota, Katalog stalne razstave, Murska Sobota 1997. ISBN 961-90438-1-2
- Slovenski biografski leksikon: Murkovič Janez
