= Gresovščak =

- Location in Slovenia
- Coordinates: 46°29′21.1″N 16°11′49.59″E
- Country: Slovenia
- Traditional region: Styria
- Statistical region: Mura
- Municipality: Ljutomer

Area
  - Total: 1.59 km^{2} (0.61 sq mi)
- Elevation: 283.8 m (931 ft)

Population (2002)
  - Total: 97

Gresovščak (pronounced [ˈɡɾeːsɔʃtʃak], in older sources Greserščak, German: Grüsserschak) is a small dispersed settlement in the Slovene Hills (Slovene: Slovenske gorice) in the Municipality of Ljutomer in northeastern Slovenia. The area is part of the traditional region of Styria and is now included in the Mura Statistical Region.

There is a small Neo-Gothic chapel-shrine in the settlement. It was built in last quarter of the 19th century.
