= Logarovci =

- Location in Slovenia
- Coordinates: 46°32′40.38″N 16°6′54.06″E
- Country: Slovenia
- Traditional region: Styria
- Statistical region: Mura
- Municipality: Križevci

Area
  - Total: 3.82 km^{2} (1.47 sq mi)
- Elevation: 185.7 m (609 ft)

Population (2002)
  - Total: 293

Logarovci (pronounced [lɔˈɡaːɾɔu̯tsi], German: Logarofzen) is a village in the Municipality of Križevci in northeastern Slovenia. The area is part of the traditional region of Styria. The municipality is now included in the Mura Statistical Region.

A village chapel-shrine was built in 1912 in the Neo-Gothic style.
