= Nedelja =

In Serbo-Croatian, nedelja means Sunday.

Nedelja may also refer to:

- Mala Nedelja, a small settlement in the eastern part of the Slovene Hills in the Municipality of Ljutomer in northeastern Slovenia
- Sveta Nedelja, Istria, a municipality in Croatia
- Sveta Nedelja, Zagreb County, a town in Croatia (also named Sveta Nedjelja before 1991)
- Sveta Nedjelja, Hvar (or Sveta Nedilja), a village in Dalmatia, Croatia
- Velika Nedelja, a settlement in the Municipality of Ormož in northeastern Slovenia

== See also ==
- Nedelja na Duhove, the only album by the Serbian rock supergroup Dobrovoljno Pevačko Društvo
- Nedelya (disambiguation), a common alternative spelling of the word in other Slavic languages
