= Zasadi, Križevci =

Zasadi
- Location in Slovenia
- Coordinates: 46°35′17.99″N 16°4′51.82″E
- Country: Slovenia
- Traditional region: Styria
- Statistical region: Mura
- Municipality: Križevci

Area
  - Total: 0.62 km^{2} (0.24 sq mi)
- Elevation: 250.2 m (821 ft)

Population (2002)
  - Total: 49

Zasadi (pronounced [ˈzaːsadi]) is a small settlement in the Municipality of Križevci in northeastern Slovenia. The area is part of the traditional region of Styria. The entire municipality is now included in the Mura Statistical Region.

A small Neo-Gothic chapel-shrine in the settlement was built in 1940 and restored in 1994.
