= Radomerje =

- Location in Slovenia
- Coordinates: 46°30′8.85″N 16°11′6.08″E
- Country: Slovenia
- Traditional region: Styria
- Statistical region: Mura
- Municipality: Ljutomer

Area
  - Total: 1.11 km^{2} (0.43 sq mi)
- Elevation: 196.3 m (644 ft)

Population (2002)
  - Total: 185

Radomerje (pronounced [ˈɾaːdɔmɛɾjɛ], German: Picheldorf) is a settlement in the Municipality of Ljutomer in northeastern Slovenia. The area belongs to the traditional region of Styria and is now included in the Mura Statistical Region.
