= Grabe pri Ljutomeru =

- Location in Slovenia
- Coordinates: 46°31′54.13″N 16°7′52.2″E
- Country: Slovenia
- Traditional region: Styria
- Statistical region: Mura
- Municipality: Križevci

Area
  - Total: 2.02 km^{2} (0.78 sq mi)
- Elevation: 180.8 m (593 ft)

Population (2002)
  - Total: 112

Grabe pri Ljutomeru (pronounced [ˈɡɾaːbɛ pɾi ˈljuːtɔmɛru], German: Grabendorf) is a settlement on the left bank of the Ščavnica River in the Municipality of Križevci in northeastern Slovenia. The area is part of the traditional region of Styria. It is now included with the rest of the municipality in the Mura Statistical Region.

== Name ==
The name of the settlement was changed from Grabe to Grabe pri Ljutomeru in 1953.

== Cultural heritage ==
The village chapel was built in the Neo-Gothic style in the last quarter of the 19th century.
