= Cuber =

- Location in Slovenia
- Coordinates: 46°29′38.41″N 16°11′5.41″E
- Country: Slovenia
- Traditional region: Styria
- Statistical region: Mura
- Municipality: Ljutomer

Area
  - Total: 0.41 km^{2} (0.16 sq mi)
- Elevation: 269 m (883 ft)

Population (2002)
  - Total: 73

Cuber (pronounced [ˈtsuːbəɾ], German: Zuber) is a small settlement in the eastern Slovene Hills (Slovene: Slovenske gorice) in the Municipality of Ljutomer in northeastern Slovenia. The area belongs to the traditional Styria region and is now included in the Mura Statistical Region.
