= Stročja Vas =

- Location in Slovenia
- Coordinates: 46°30′32.88″N 16°13′33.43″E
- Country: Slovenia
- Traditional region: Styria
- Statistical region: Mura
- Municipality: Ljutomer

Area
  - Total: 2.42 km^{2} (0.93 sq mi)
- Elevation: 190.6 m (625 ft)

Population (2002)
  - Total: 490

Stročja Vas (pronounced [ˈstɾoːtʃja ˈʋaːs]; Slovene: Stročja vas, in older sources also Stročja Ves, German: Schützendorf) is a village in the Municipality of Ljutomer in northeastern Slovenia. The area is part of the traditional region of Styria and is now included in the Mura Statistical Region.

== Name ==
Stročja Vas was attested in written sources in 1438 and 1443 as Schuetzendorf (and also as Schüczendorff in 1443 and as Schuczendorf in 1468). The Slovene name is derived from the adjective *strelьčьja (via *streočja), thus originally meaning 'shooter's village'. This is confirmed by the medieval German attestations, which are a compound of Middle High German schütze 'shooter' + dorf 'village'. In the past the German name was Schützendorf.

== Chapel ==
The local chapel in the centre of the settlement was built in the Neo-Gothic style in 1866 on the foundations of an older plague column. It was renovated in 1999.
