= Nunska Graba =

- Location in Slovenia
- Coordinates: 46°30′7.75″N 16°13′51.16″E
- Country: Slovenia
- Traditional region: Styria
- Statistical region: Mura
- Municipality: Ljutomer

Area
  - Total: 1.25 km^{2} (0.48 sq mi)
- Elevation: 199.2 m (654 ft)

Population (2002)
  - Total: 164

Nunska Graba (pronounced [ˈnuːnska ˈɡɾaːba]; German: Schützenberg) is a settlement in the hills southeast of Ljutomer in northeastern Slovenia, close to the border with Croatia. The area is part of the traditional region of Styria and is now included in the Mura Statistical Region.

== Name ==
The name Nunska graba literally means 'nuns' ravine'. Nuns are said to have formerly lived in the Kodolitsch vineyard cottage in the settlement, which may be the origin of the name.

== History ==
Until expropriation after the Second World War, most of the vineyards in the settlement were foreign-owned. The owners included the Diocese of Graz-Seckau, the Dominican monastery in Graz, and the Kodolitsch family of Bad Radkersburg, and prior to this Rein Abbey north of Graz and the Scheit noble family, after whom the grape variety šajtovšca is named.

== Notable people ==
Notable people that were born or lived in Nunska Graba include:

- Anton Čeh (1882–1930), church painter
