= Presika, Ljutomer =

Presika
- Location in Slovenia
- Coordinates: 46°29′34″N 16°14′26.95″E
- Country: Slovenia
- Traditional region: Styria
- Statistical region: Mura
- Municipality: Ljutomer

Area
  - Total: 0.92 km^{2} (0.36 sq mi)
- Elevation: 195.1 m (640 ft)

Population (2002)
  - Total: 151

Presika (pronounced [ˈpɾeːsika]) is a settlement in the Municipality of Ljutomer in northeastern Slovenia, right on the border with Croatia. The area belongs to the traditional Styria region and is now included in the Mura Statistical Region.

The local chapel was built in memory of soldiers that died in the First World War.
