= Ključarovci pri Ljutomeru =

- Location in Slovenia
- Coordinates: 46°33′0.28″N 16°8′17.99″E
- Country: Slovenia
- Traditional region: Styria
- Statistical region: Mura
- Municipality: Križevci

Area
  - Total: 2.6 km^{2} (1.0 sq mi)
- Elevation: 183.6 m (602 ft)

Population (2002)
  - Total: 377

Ključarovci pri Ljutomeru (pronounced [kljuˈtʃaːɾɔu̯tsi pɾi ˈljuːtɔmɛɾu], German: Schlüsseldorf) is a village in the Municipality of Križevci in northeastern Slovenia. The area is part of the traditional region of Styria and is now included in the Mura Statistical Region.
