= Pristava, Ljutomer =

Pristava
- Location in Slovenia
- Coordinates: 46°31′21.94″N 16°14′19.11″E
- Country: Slovenia
- Traditional region: Styria
- Statistical region: Mura
- Municipality: Ljutomer

Area
  - Total: 3.55 km^{2} (1.37 sq mi)
- Elevation: 172.6 m (566 ft)

Population (2002)
  - Total: 277

Pristava (pronounced [ˈpɾiːstaʋa]) is a settlement on the left bank of the Ščavnica River in the Municipality of Ljutomer in northeastern Slovenia. The area belongs to the traditional Styria region and is now included in the Mura Statistical Region.

The local chapel in the centre of the village was built in 1888 and renovated in 1999.
