= Iljaševci =

- Location in Slovenia
- Coordinates: 46°34′27.1″N 16°7′42.7″E
- Country: Slovenia
- Traditional region: Styria
- Statistical region: Mura
- Municipality: Križevci

Area
  - Total: 4.36 km^{2} (1.68 sq mi)
- Elevation: 188.7 m (619 ft)

Population (2002)
  - Total: 211

Iljaševci (pronounced [iˈljaːʃɛu̯tsi], in older sources Iljašovci, German: Igelsdorf) is a village in the Municipality of Križevci in northeastern Slovenia. The area is part of the traditional region of Styria. The entire municipality is now included in the Mura Statistical Region.

A small Neo-Gothic chapel in the settlement was built in 1871 and renovated in 1879 and 1921.
