= Gajševci =

- Location in Slovenia
- Coordinates: 46°35′15.55″N 16°6′17.27″E
- Country: Slovenia
- Traditional region: Styria
- Statistical region: Mura
- Municipality: Križevci

Area
  - Total: 1.57 km^{2} (0.61 sq mi)
- Elevation: 191.5 m (628 ft)

Population (2002)
  - Total: 268

Gajševci (pronounced [ˈɡaːi̯ʃɛu̯tsi]) is a settlement in the Municipality of Križevci in northeastern Slovenia. It lies on the Ščavnica River, next to a small lake. The area is part of the traditional region of Styria. It is now included with the rest of the municipality in the Mura Statistical Region.
