= Boreci =

- Location in Slovenia
- Coordinates: 46°33′29.47″N 16°8′13.44″E
- Country: Slovenia
- Traditional region: Styria
- Statistical region: Mura
- Municipality: Križevci

Area
  - Total: 3.05 km^{2} (1.18 sq mi)
- Elevation: 181.8 m (596 ft)

Population (2002)
  - Total: 286

Boreci (pronounced [bɔˈɾeːtsi], German: Woretzen) is a village in the Municipality of Križevci in northeastern Slovenia. The area is part of the traditional region of Styria and is now included in the Mura Statistical Region.

The village chapel with a belfry was built in 1903 in the Neo-Romanesque style.
