= Vogričevci =

- Location in Slovenia
- Coordinates: 46°31′1.21″N 16°6′59.96″E
- Country: Slovenia
- Traditional region: Styria
- Statistical region: Mura
- Municipality: Ljutomer

Area
  - Total: 2.17 km^{2} (0.84 sq mi)
- Elevation: 195.6 m (642 ft)

Population (2002)
  - Total: 163

Vogričevci (pronounced [ʋɔˈɡɾiːtʃɛu̯tsi], in older sources Vogričovci, German: Wogritschofzen) is a settlement in the Municipality of Ljutomer in northeastern Slovenia. The area is part of the traditional region of Styria and is now included in the Mura Statistical Region.

The local chapel in the centre of the settlement was built in the Neo-Gothic style in the late 19th century.
