= Grlava =

- Location in Slovenia
- Coordinates: 46°33′29.51″N 16°10′17.86″E
- Country: Slovenia
- Traditional region: Styria
- Statistical region: Mura
- Municipality: Ljutomer

Area
  - Total: 1.51 km^{2} (0.58 sq mi)
- Elevation: 179.5 m (589 ft)

Population (2002)
  - Total: 111

Grlava (pronounced [ˈɡəɾlaʋa]; in older sources Grlova, German: Gerlova) is a small village in the Municipality of Ljutomer in northeastern Slovenia. The area belongs to the traditional Styria region and is now included in the Mura Statistical Region.

There is a small Neo-Gothic chapel in the settlement. It was built in 1912 and renovated in 1994.
