= Rinčetova Graba =

- Location in Slovenia
- Coordinates: 46°29′54.37″N 16°13′30.22″E
- Country: Slovenia
- Traditional region: Styria
- Statistical region: Mura
- Municipality: Ljutomer

Area
  - Total: 1.29 km^{2} (0.50 sq mi)
- Elevation: 203.7 m (668 ft)

Population (2002)
  - Total: 108

Rinčetova Graba (pronounced [ˈɾiːntʃɛtɔʋa ˈɡɾaːba]) is a settlement in the hills southeast of Ljutomer in northeastern Slovenia. The area belongs to the traditional Styria region and is now included in the Mura Statistical Region.
