= Trstenjak =

Trstenjak is a Slovenian surname. Notable people with the surname include:

- Anton Trstenjak (1906–1996), Slovenian psychologist, theologian and author
- Ante Trstenjak (1894–1970), Slovenian psychologist, painter and illustrator
- Davorin Trstenjak (1817–1890), Slovenian writer, historian and Roman Catholic priest
- Tina Trstenjak (born 1990), Slovenian judoka
- Verica Trstenjak (born 1962), Slovenian lawyer and judge
