= Krapje =

Krapje may refer to:

- Krapje, Slovenia, a village near Ljutomer
- Krapje, Croatia, a village near Jasenovac
