= General strike of 14 October 1918 =

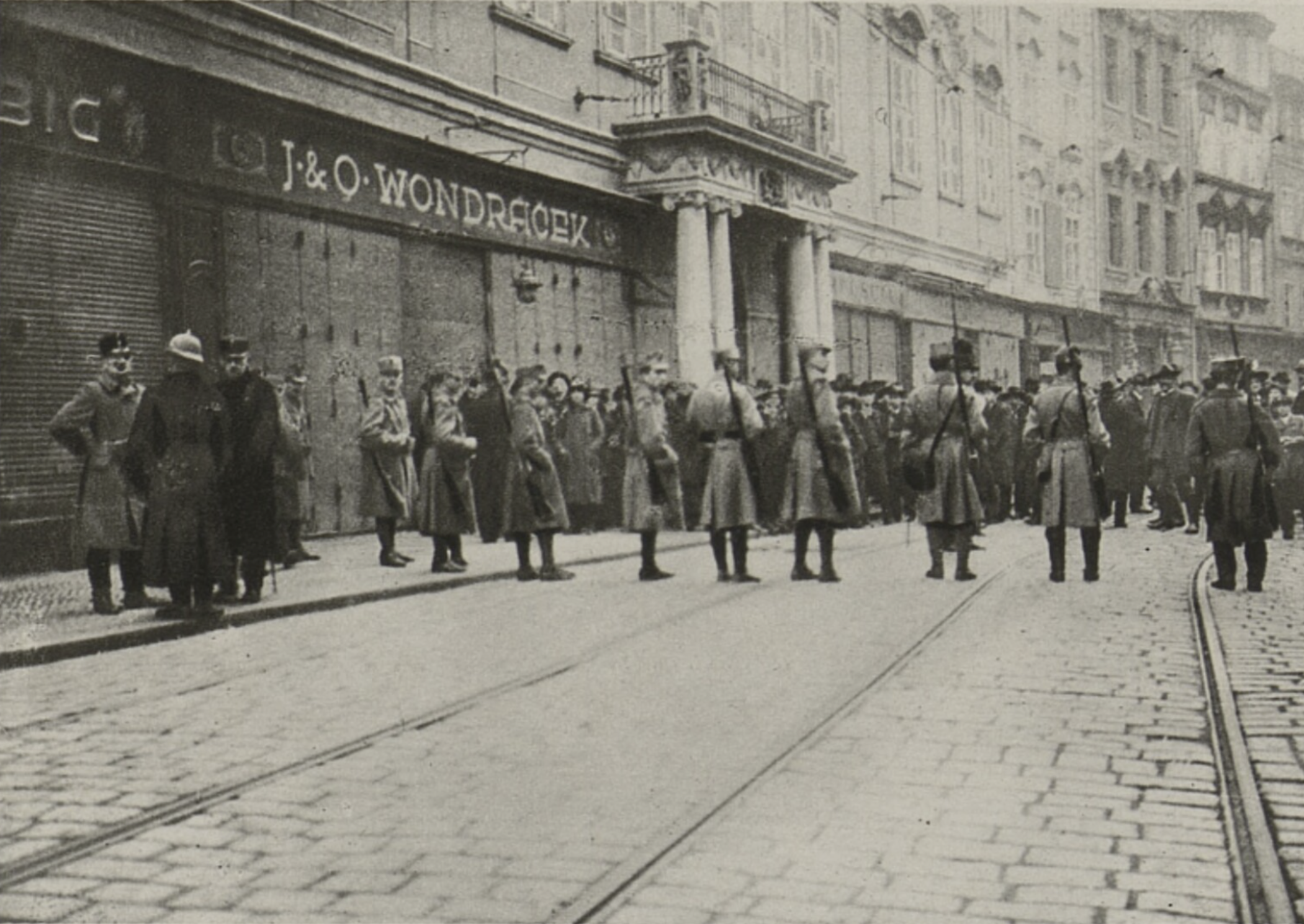
Strikers and Austro-Hungarian soldiers in the streets of Prague (14 October 1918)

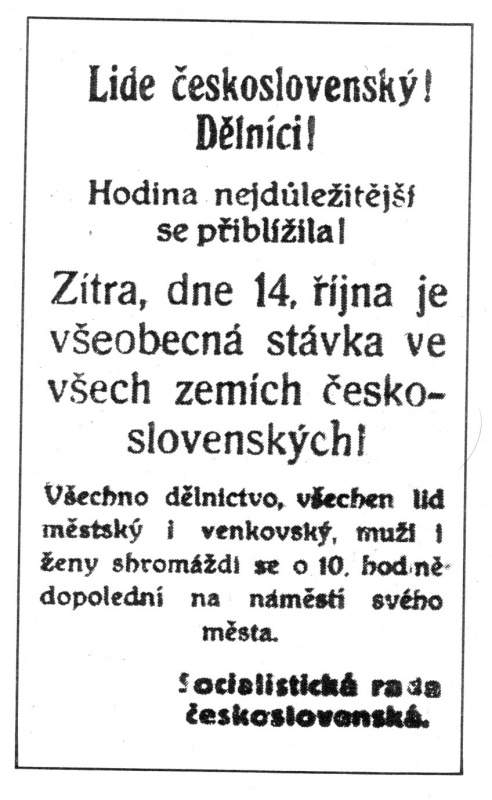
A call for a strike.

The general strike declared on 14 October 1918 was one of the events that preceded the creation of Czechoslovakia and the end of the First World War.

== Background of the strike ==
The announcement of the strike came in the atmosphere of a collapsing Austro-Hungarian Empire, when a quick end to the war was expected. The situation on all fronts was developing to the detriment of the Central Powers. The declaration was published on 12 October 1918.

The strike was called by the Socialist Council, a body uniting social democrats and national socialists. Initially, it envisaged the declaration of a socially just state independent of Austria-Hungary. The main reason, however, was widespread hunger and the export of grain and coal from Bohemia for the needs of the Austro-Hungarian army at the front. The entire year of 1918 was marked by strikes, demonstrations and desertions of soldiers in the Czech lands (and elsewhere in Austria-Hungary). This theme later resonated even on the day of the founding of Czechoslovakia on 28 October 1918, when the National Committee took over the War Grain Institute, which managed the distribution of grain and flour.

== Strike progress ==
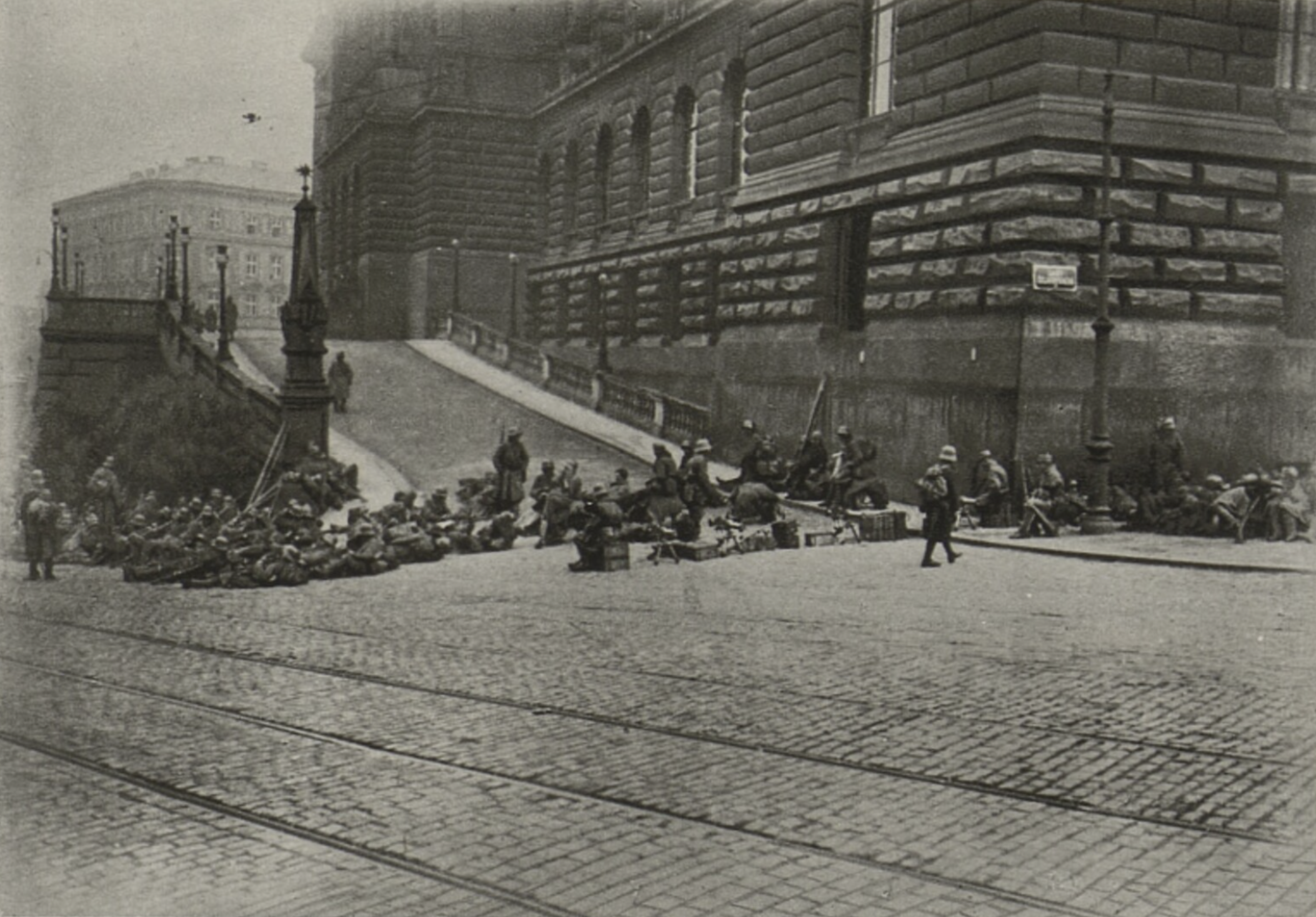
Hungarian soldiers in front of the National Museum on Wenceslas Square (October 14, 1918)

When the deputy commander of the Prague military garrison, Marshal Eduard Zanantoni, learned of the intention to declare a strike, he had the army deployed in Prague. The presence of security forces made it impossible for larger demonstrations and political manifestations. The strike itself was nevertheless successful. Most factories and plants in Bohemia, some in Moravia and only a very few in Silesia, stopped work. Approximately 35,000 workers in Prague took part in the strike.

The National Committee feared bloodshed, tried to call off the planned demonstrations and distanced itself from the intended declaration of independence, but the protests failed to be called off. However, there was no violence. It feared that the Socialist Council would declare a new state prematurely and that security forces loyal to the disappearing Austria-Hungary would be able to suppress the entire event.

Some of the leaders of the Socialist Council were later arrested.

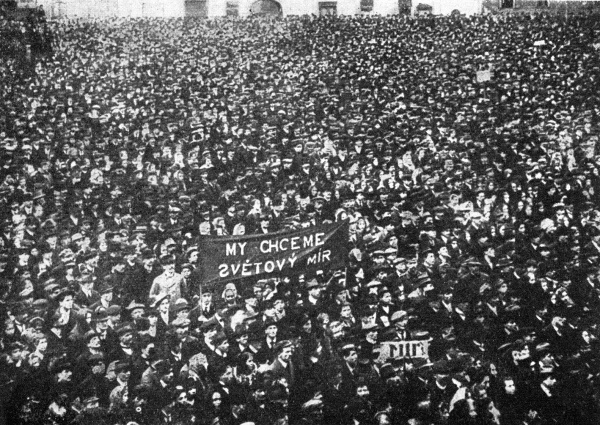
Demonstration on the main square in Kladně (14 October 1918)

News of the announced strike spread wildly throughout Bohemia, Moravia, and Silesia. In Písek in South Bohemia, it was interpreted as the establishment of a new state, and so instead of a strike, the people of Písek mistakenly declared a republic two weeks early. The organizers of the Socialist Council's action committee considered officially declaring a republic on the day of the strike, but they backed down from this plan after learning of the presence of troops and security forces in Prague. The announced marches of workers from factories on the outskirts of Prague to the city center were thus canceled. A so-called people's camp was to take place on Old Town Square, but this was also cancelled.

== Event response ==
These events alarmed the Austro-Hungarian government, which was very concerned about chaos and the rise of Bolshevism. On 16 October, it sent Major Rudolf Kalhouse to Prague to negotiate with the Czech leaders to maintain discipline in the Czech regiments. Rašín promised him this in exchange for a promise of better treatment from Vienna towards the Czechs.

The strike unpleasantly surprised the Czechoslovak National Committee, which distanced itself from it. A few days later, at a meeting between representatives of the National Committee and the Socialist Council, it was decided that all events of this nature would be managed solely by the National Committee in the future.

On the same day, the Provisional Czechoslovak Government, headed by Tomáš Masaryk, was introduced.

== See also ==
- Origins of Czechoslovakia
- Czechoslovak declaration of independence
