= Ilovci =

- Location in Slovenia
- Coordinates: 46°28′59.09″N 16°12′9.92″E
- Country: Slovenia
- Traditional region: Styria
- Statistical region: Mura
- Municipality: Ljutomer

Area
  - Total: 2.1 km^{2} (0.81 sq mi)
- Elevation: 306.7 m (1,006 ft)

Population (2002)
  - Total: 109

Ilovci (pronounced [ˈiːlɔu̯tsi]) is a small dispersed settlement in the eastern part of the Slovene Hills (Slovene: Slovenske gorice) in the Municipality of Ljutomer in northeastern Slovenia. The area belongs to the traditional region of Styria and is now included in the Mura Statistical Region.
