= Karol Grossmann =

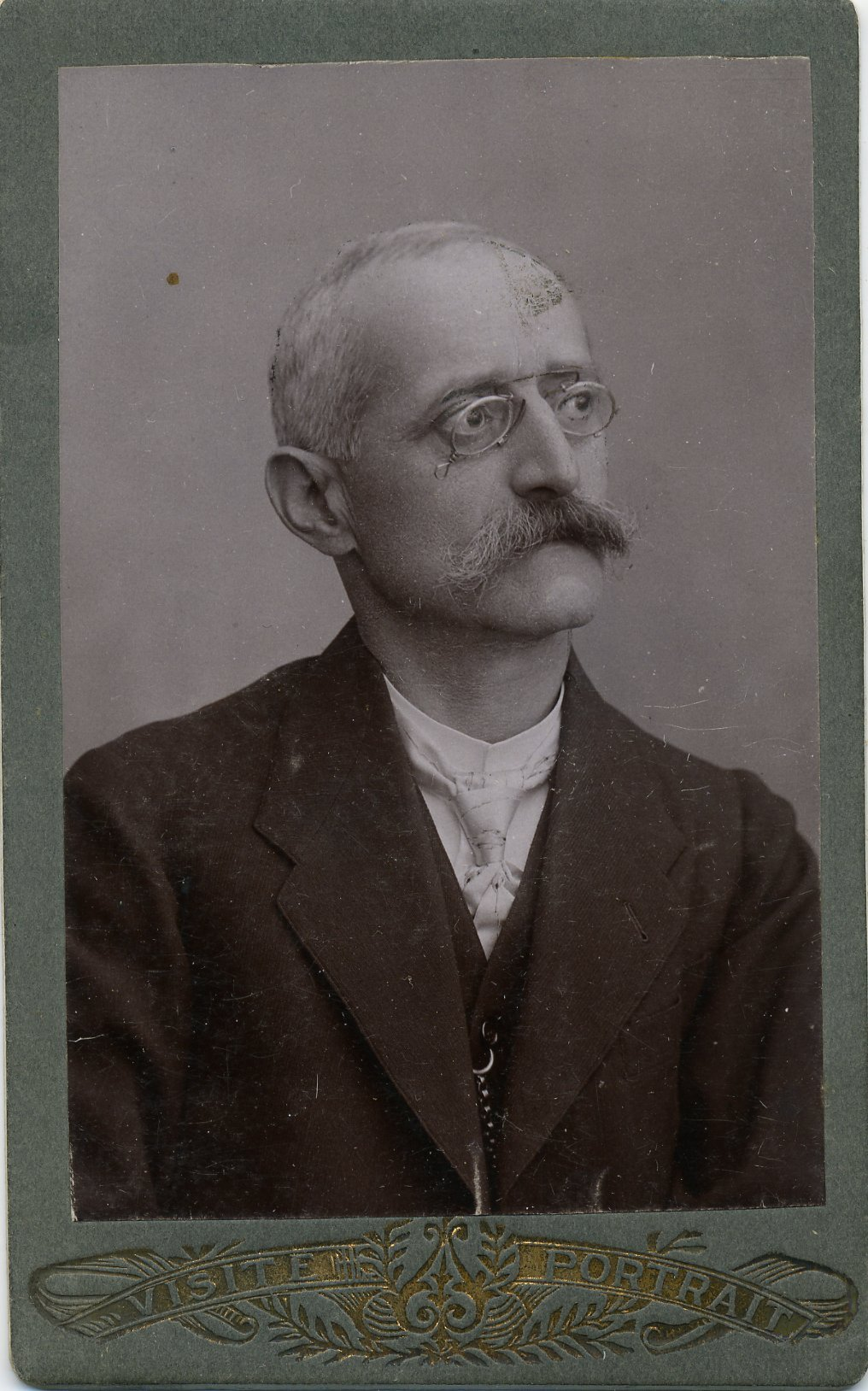
Karol Grossmann

Karol Grossmann (27 October 1864 – 3 August 1929) was a pioneering Slovenian film maker in the Austro-Hungarian Empire.

He was born in Drakovci near Mala Nedelja on 27 October 1864. He was a lawyer in Ljutomer. He was the first Slovene amateur filmmaker. In 1905, he made the first Slovene film record in Ljutomer in northeastern Slovenia. A projection of two of his films is available at the Museum in Ljutomer. He died in Ljutomer.

The World Day for Audiovisual Heritage is commemorated on 27 October of every year after his birthday.

== Filmography ==
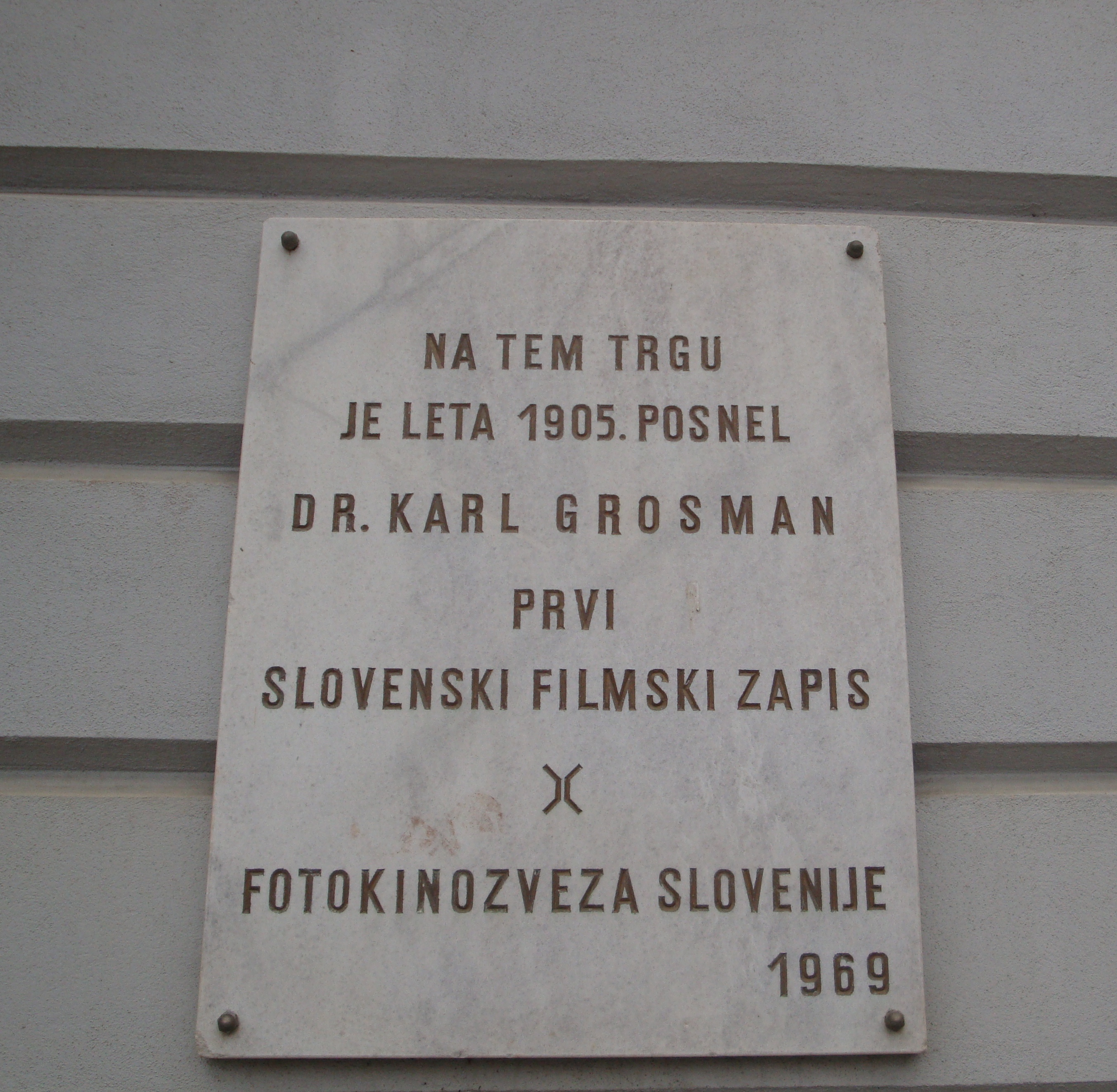
The plaque at the site in Ljutomer, where in 1905 Karol Grossmann made the first Slovene film recording

- Dismissal from Mass in Ljutomer (Odhod od maše v Ljutomeru) - 1905
- Fair in Ljutomer (Sejem v Ljutomeru) - 1905
- In the Family Garden (Na domačem vrtu) - 1906
