= Kuršinci =

- Location in Slovenia
- Coordinates: 46°31′11.76″N 16°3′50.62″E
- Country: Slovenia
- Traditional region: Styria
- Statistical region: Mura
- Municipality: Ljutomer

Area
  - Total: 2.81 km^{2} (1.08 sq mi)
- Elevation: 261.3 m (857 ft)

Population (2002)
  - Total: 178

Kuršinci (pronounced [ˈkuːɾʃintsi]) is a settlement in the Municipality of Ljutomer in northeastern Slovenia. The area belongs to the traditional Styria region and is now included in the Mura Statistical Region.
