= Noršinci pri Ljutomeru =

- Location in Slovenia
- Coordinates: 46°32′13.26″N 16°10′31.24″E
- Country: Slovenia
- Traditional region: Styria
- Statistical region: Mura
- Municipality: Ljutomer

Area
  - Total: 2.38 km^{2} (0.92 sq mi)
- Elevation: 177 m (581 ft)

Population (2002)
  - Total: 216

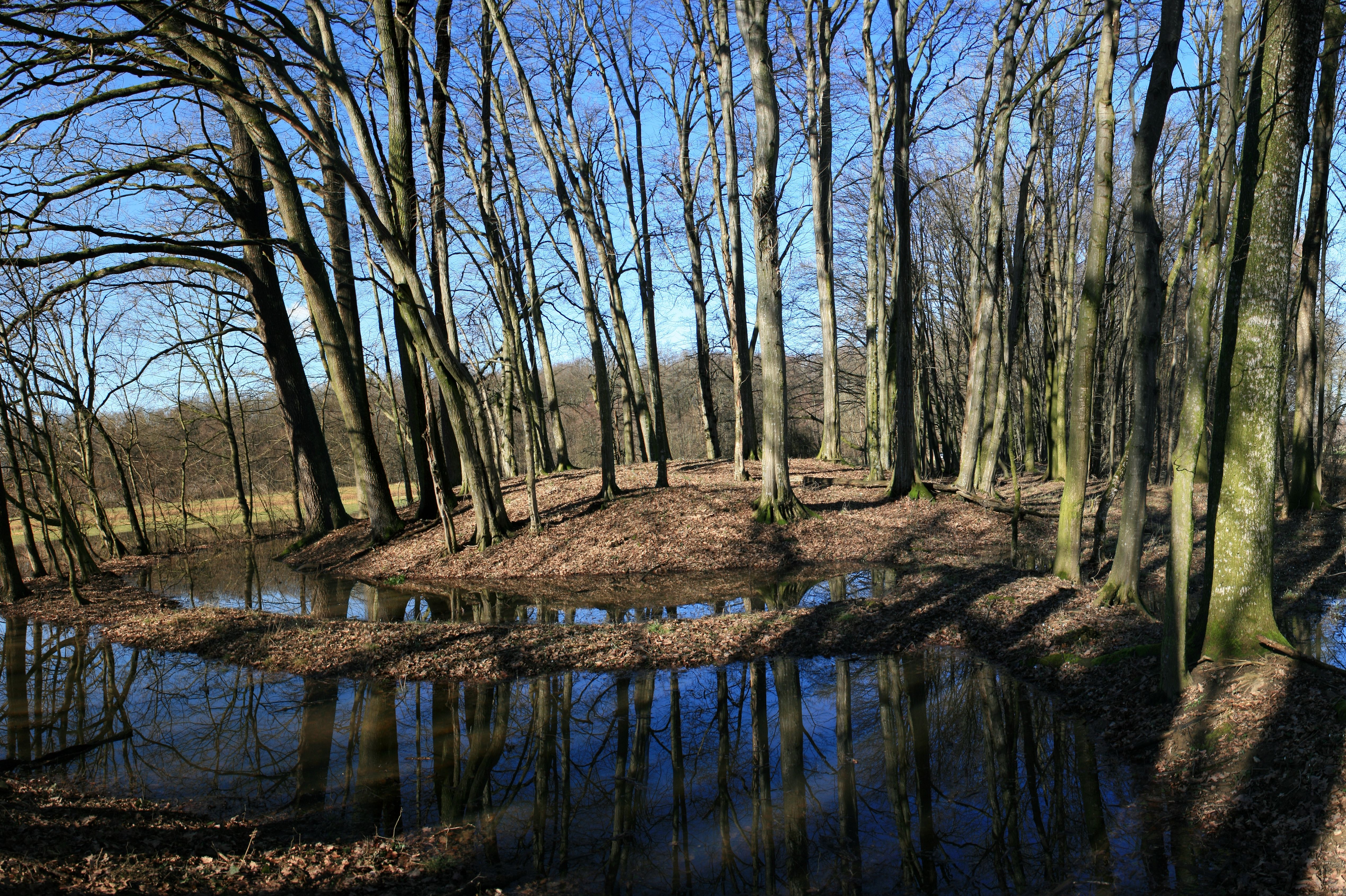

Noršinci pri Ljutomeru (pronounced [ˈnoːɾʃintsi pɾi ˈljuːtɔmɛɾu]) is a settlement northwest of Ljutomer in northeastern Slovenia. The area is part of the traditional region of Styria and is now included in the Mura Statistical Region.

== Name ==
The name of the settlement was changed from Noršinci to Noršinci pri Ljutomeru in 1955.

== Cultural heritage ==
The local chapel-shrine in the centre of the village was built in the last quarter of the 19th century.
