= Mojca =

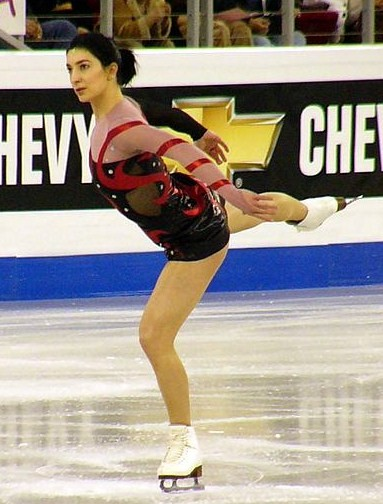
Mojca Kopač

Mojca (Slovene pronunciation: [ˈmoːjt͡sa]) is a Slovenian female given name. Notable people with this name include:

- Mojca Božič (born 1992), Slovenian volleyball player
- Mojca Cater (born 1970), Canadian butterfly swimmer
- Mojca Dežman (born 1967), Slovenian alpine skier
- Mojca Drčar Murko (born 1942), Slovenian politician
- Mojca Erdmann (born 1975), German soprano
- Mojca Kleva (born 1976), Slovene political scientist and politician
- Mojca Kopač (born 1975), Slovenian figure skater
- Mojca Kumerdej (born 1964), Slovene writer, philosopher and critic
- Mojca Osojnik (born 1970), Slovene painter and illustrator
- Mojca Rataj (born 1979), Bosnian-Slovenian alpine skier
- Mojca Sagmeister (born 1996), Slovenian swimmer
- Mojca Senčar (1940-2019), Slovene physician
- Mojca Suhadolc (born 1975), Slovenian alpine skier
