= Mala Nedelja =

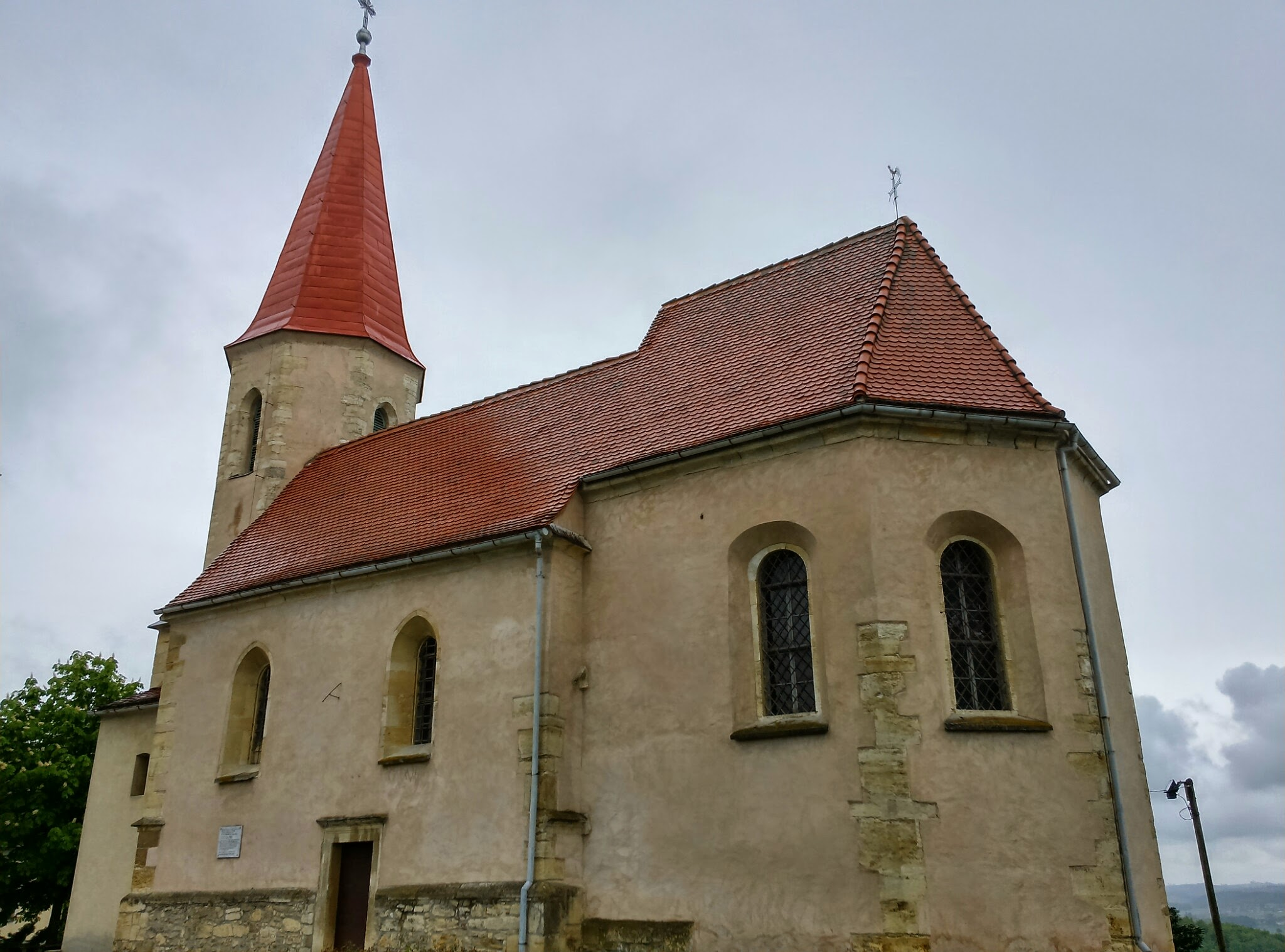
- Parish church

- Location in Slovenia
- Coordinates: 46°31′13.37″N 16°3′16.4″E
- Country: Slovenia
- Traditional region: Styria
- Statistical region: Mura
- Municipality: Ljutomer

Area
  - Total: 0.52 km^{2} (0.20 sq mi)
- Elevation: 264.2 m (867 ft)

Population (2002)
  - Total: 117

Mala Nedelja (pronounced [ˈmaːla ˈnɛːdɛlja]; in older sources also Mala Nedela, German: Kleinsonntag) is a small settlement in the eastern part of the Slovene Hills (Slovene: Slovenske gorice) in the Municipality of Ljutomer in northeastern Slovenia. The area is part of the traditional region of Styria and is now included in the Mura Statistical Region.

== History ==
Mala Nedelja was formerly part of Bučkovci. It was made a separate settlement in 1991.

== Church ==
The local parish church is dedicated to the Holy Trinity and belongs to the Roman Catholic Diocese of Murska Sobota. It was first mentioned in written documents dating to 1441. The belfry was added in 1521 and in the mid-16th century a second nave was built.

== Notable people ==
Notable people that were born or lived in Mala Nedelja include:

- János Murkovics (1839–1917), writer
