= Radoslavci =

- Location in Slovenia
- Coordinates: 46°31′31.97″N 16°5′50.44″E
- Country: Slovenia
- Traditional region: Styria
- Statistical region: Mura
- Municipality: Ljutomer

Area
  - Total: 5.25 km^{2} (2.03 sq mi)
- Elevation: 191.5 m (628 ft)

Population (2002)
  - Total: 307

Radoslavci (pronounced [ˈɾaːdɔslau̯tsi]) is a settlement in the Municipality of Ljutomer in northeastern Slovenia. The area belongs to the traditional region of Styria and is now included in the Mura Statistical Region.

The local chapel in the southern part of the settlement was built in the late 19th century.

== Gallery ==
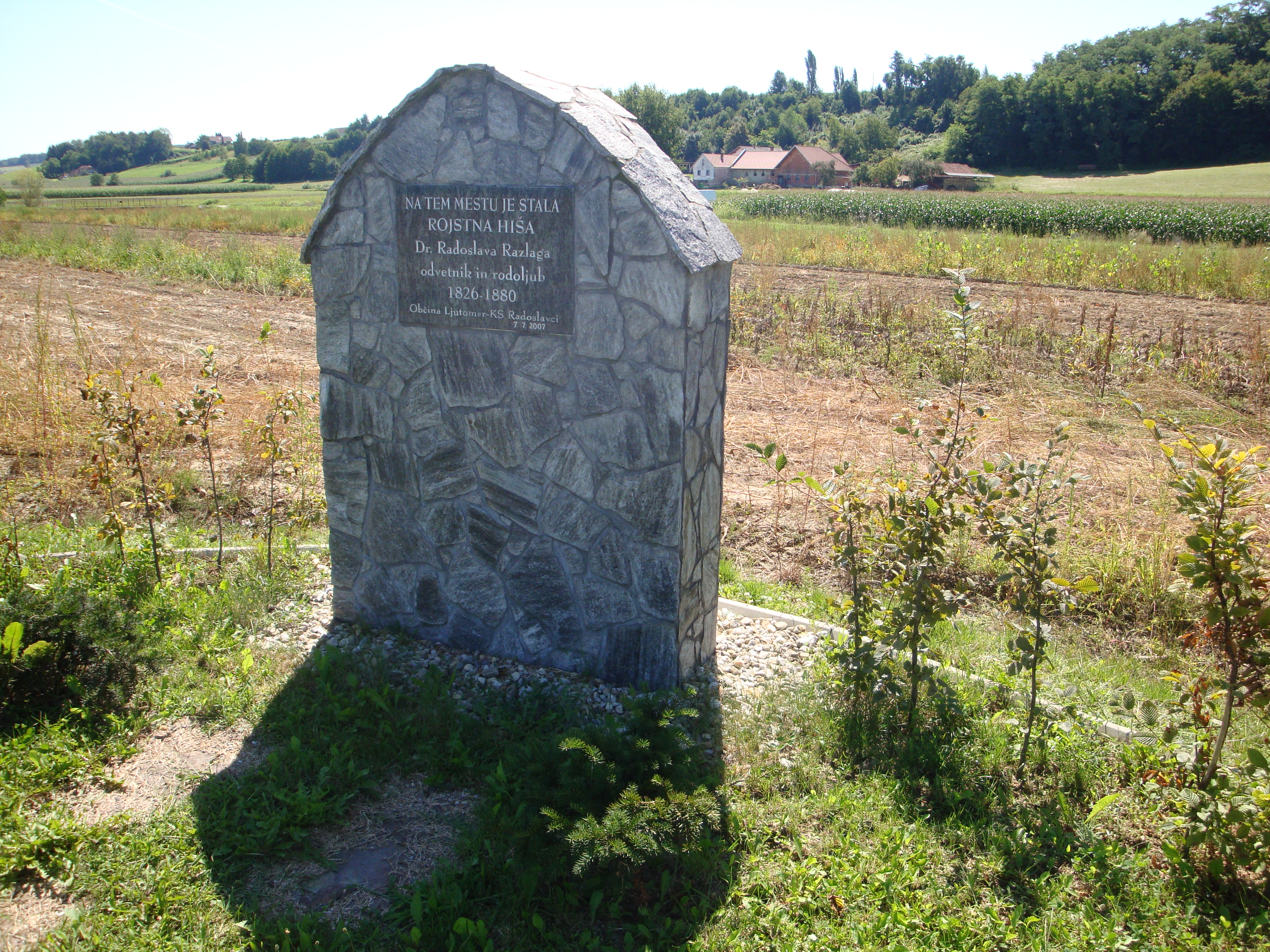
Commemorative stone in Radoslavci
