= Zgornji Kamenščak =

- Location in Slovenia
- Coordinates: 46°30′41.6″N 16°7′50.69″E
- Country: Slovenia
- Traditional region: Styria
- Statistical region: Mura
- Municipality: Ljutomer

Area
  - Total: 0.6 km^{2} (0.23 sq mi)
- Elevation: 257.9 m (846 ft)

Population (2002)
  - Total: 106

Zgornji Kamenščak (pronounced [ˈzɡoːɾnji ˈkaːmɛnʃtʃak], German: Obersteinberg) is a settlement in the Municipality of Ljutomer in northeastern Slovenia. The area belongs to the traditional Styria region and is now included in the Mura Statistical Region.
