= Križevci pri Ljutomeru =

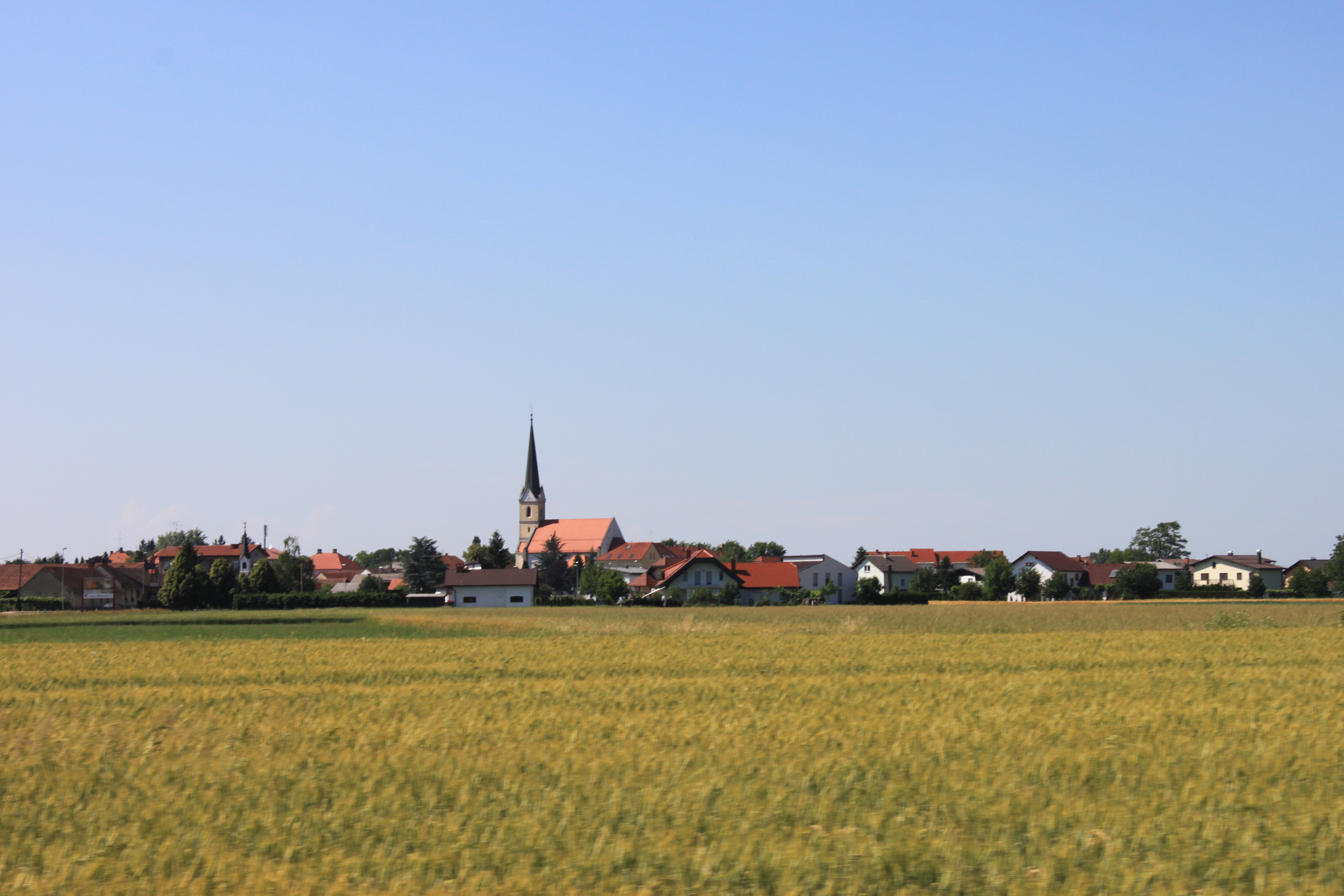

- Location in Slovenia
- Coordinates: 46°33′47.18″N 16°8′23.67″E
- Country: Slovenia
- Traditional region: Styria
- Statistical region: Mura
- Municipality: Križevci

Area
  - Total: 2.1 km^{2} (0.81 sq mi)
- Elevation: 185 m (607 ft)

Population (2012)
  - Total: 499

Križevci pri Ljutomeru (pronounced [ˈkɾiːʒɛu̯tsi pɾi ˈljuːtɔmɛru], in older sources Križovci, German: Kreuzdorf) is a settlement in the Prlekija region in eastern Slovenia. It is the seat of the Municipality of Križevci. It is part of the traditional region of Styria and is now included in the Mura Statistical Region.

== Church ==
The local parish church, built in the centre of the settlement, is dedicated to the Holy Cross and belongs to the Roman Catholic Diocese of Murska Sobota. It was built in 1891 with some elements of the earlier 12th- and 15th-century buildings incorporated into the current Neo-Romanesque building.

== Notable people ==
Notable people that were born or lived in Križevci pri Ljutomeru include:

- Franc Kirar (1893–1978), beekeeper
