= Babinci =

- Location in Slovenia
- Coordinates: 46°32′28.46″N 16°11′4.89″E
- Country: Slovenia
- Traditional region: Styria
- Statistical region: Mura
- Municipality: Ljutomer

Area
  - Total: 2.19 km^{2} (0.85 sq mi)
- Elevation: 177.4 m (582 ft)

Population (2002)
  - Total: 292

Babinci (pronounced [ˈbaːbintsi]) is a village in the Municipality of Ljutomer in northeastern Slovenia. The area belongs to the traditional Styria region and is now included in the Mura Statistical Region.

== Name ==
Babinci was attested in written sources c. 1280–1295 as villa Wakendorf. Like similar place names (e.g., Babna Brda, Babiči, Babna Gora, etc.), the name is derived from the Slovene common noun baba. In addition to the basic meaning 'old woman', baba often means 'rocky outcrop, cliff; mountain top, peak' and generally refers to a local terrain feature.

== Cultural heritage ==
There is a small chapel in the centre of the village. It was built in the late 19th century.
