= Krištanci =

- Location in Slovenia
- Coordinates: 46°33′17.37″N 16°10′32.63″E
- Country: Slovenia
- Traditional region: Styria
- Statistical region: Mura
- Municipality: Ljutomer

Area
  - Total: 1.29 km^{2} (0.50 sq mi)
- Elevation: 179.1 m (588 ft)

Population (2002)
  - Total: 76

Krištanci (pronounced [ˈkɾiːʃtantsi], German: Kristanzen) is a small settlement in the Municipality of Ljutomer in northeastern Slovenia. The area is part of the traditional region of Styria and is now included in the Mura Statistical Region.

The local chapel is a Neo-Gothic building, built in 1904 and renovated in 1997.
