= Drakovci =

- Location in Slovenia
- Coordinates: 46°31′38.31″N 16°1′29.89″E
- Country: Slovenia
- Traditional region: Styria
- Statistical region: Mura
- Municipality: Ljutomer

Area
  - Total: 4.18 km^{2} (1.61 sq mi)
- Elevation: 278.6 m (914 ft)

Population (2002)
  - Total: 247

Drakovci (pronounced [ˈdɾaːkɔu̯tsi]) is a settlement in the eastern Slovene Hills (Slovene: Slovenske gorice) in the Municipality of Ljutomer in northeastern Slovenia. The area belongs to the traditional Styria region and is now included in the Mura Statistical Region.

Karel Grossmann, a pioneering Slovene filmmaker, was born in the village in 1864. The house in which he was born still stands, and a commemorative plaque was unveiled on it in 1988.
