= Bodislavci =

- Location in Slovenia
- Coordinates: 46°30′22.38″N 16°3′31.36″E
- Country: Slovenia
- Traditional region: Styria
- Statistical region: Mura
- Municipality: Ljutomer

Area
  - Total: 2.48 km^{2} (0.96 sq mi)
- Elevation: 264.6 m (868 ft)

Population (2002)
  - Total: 149

Bodislavci (pronounced [ˈboːdislau̯tsi], German: Wodislafzen) is a settlement in the Slovene Hills (Slovene: Slovenske gorice) in the Municipality of Ljutomer, Slovenia. The area belongs to the traditional Styria region and is now included in the Mura Statistical Region.

== Name ==
Bodislavci was attested in written sources in 1445 as Wodischlawczen and c. 1500 as Ladislafftzen. The name is probably derived from the Slavic personal name *Bǫdislavъ, referring to an early resident of the village.
