= Stara Cesta =

- Location in Slovenia
- Coordinates: 46°30′15.81″N 16°8′10.8″E
- Country: Slovenia
- Traditional region: Styria
- Statistical region: Mura
- Municipality: Ljutomer

Area
  - Total: 3.01 km^{2} (1.16 sq mi)
- Elevation: 287.1 m (942 ft)

Population (2002)
  - Total: 264

Stara Cesta (pronounced [ˈstaːɾa ˈtseːsta]) is a settlement in the Municipality of Ljutomer in northeastern Slovenia. The area belongs to the traditional Styria region and is now included in the Mura Statistical Region.

The local chapel in the centre of the village was built in the late 19th century. It is dedicated to the Sacred Heart of Jesus.
