= Godemarci =

- Location in Slovenia
- Coordinates: 46°30′26.88″N 16°4′44.15″E
- Country: Slovenia
- Traditional region: Styria
- Statistical region: Mura
- Municipality: Ljutomer

Area
  - Total: 3.15 km^{2} (1.22 sq mi)
- Elevation: 257 m (843 ft)

Population (2002)
  - Total: 103

Godemarci (pronounced [ɡɔˈdeːmaɾtsi], German: Godomerzen) is a settlement in the Slovene Hills (Slovene: Slovenske gorice) in the Municipality of Ljutomer in northeastern Slovenia. The area is part of the traditional region of Styria and is now included in the Mura Statistical Region.

There is a small chapel-shrine in the settlement. It was built in the second half of the 19th century.
