= Nedelya =

In most Slavic languages, nedelya means Sunday.

Nedelya may also refer to:

- Nedelya (pastry shop), a chain of pastry and coffee shops headquartered in Sofia, Bulgaria
- Nedelya (newspaper), a Russian newspaper published between 1866 and 1901
- Nedelya Petkova, Bulgarian education pioneer and revolutionary
- Nedelya Point, an ice-free point off the coast of Antarctica
- Saint Nedelya, popular Slavic personification of Sunday
- Saint Nedelya Cathedral, Sofia, an Eastern Orthodox Cathedral in Sofia, Bulgaria

== See also ==
- Nedelja (disambiguation), the Serbo-Croatian spelling of the word
