= Cezanjevci =

- Location in Slovenia
- Coordinates: 46°31′11.63″N 16°9′4.51″E
- Country: Slovenia
- Traditional region: Styria
- Statistical region: Mura
- Municipality: Ljutomer

Area
  - Total: 3.81 km^{2} (1.47 sq mi)
- Elevation: 183.4 m (602 ft)

Population (2002)
  - Total: 228

Cezanjevci (pronounced [tsɛˈzaːnjɛu̯tsi], in older sources Cezanjovci, German: Zesendorf) is a village on the right bank of the Ščavnica River in the Municipality of Ljutomer in northeastern Slovenia. The area belongs to the traditional Styria region and is now included in the Mura Statistical Region.

== Demographics ==
In 2022, the population was approximately 217 (males: 103, females:114). There has been an annual population change of −1.8%. Cezanjevci has an area of 3,800 km² with a population density of 57.11/km².

== Church ==
The local parish church in the settlement is dedicated to Saint Roch and Saint Sebastian and belongs to the Roman Catholic Diocese of Murska Sobota. It is a single-nave building built in 1675. The belfry was added in 1679.
