= Municipality of Križevci =

Municipality of Slovenia

Municipality of Križevci Občina Križevci
- Municipality
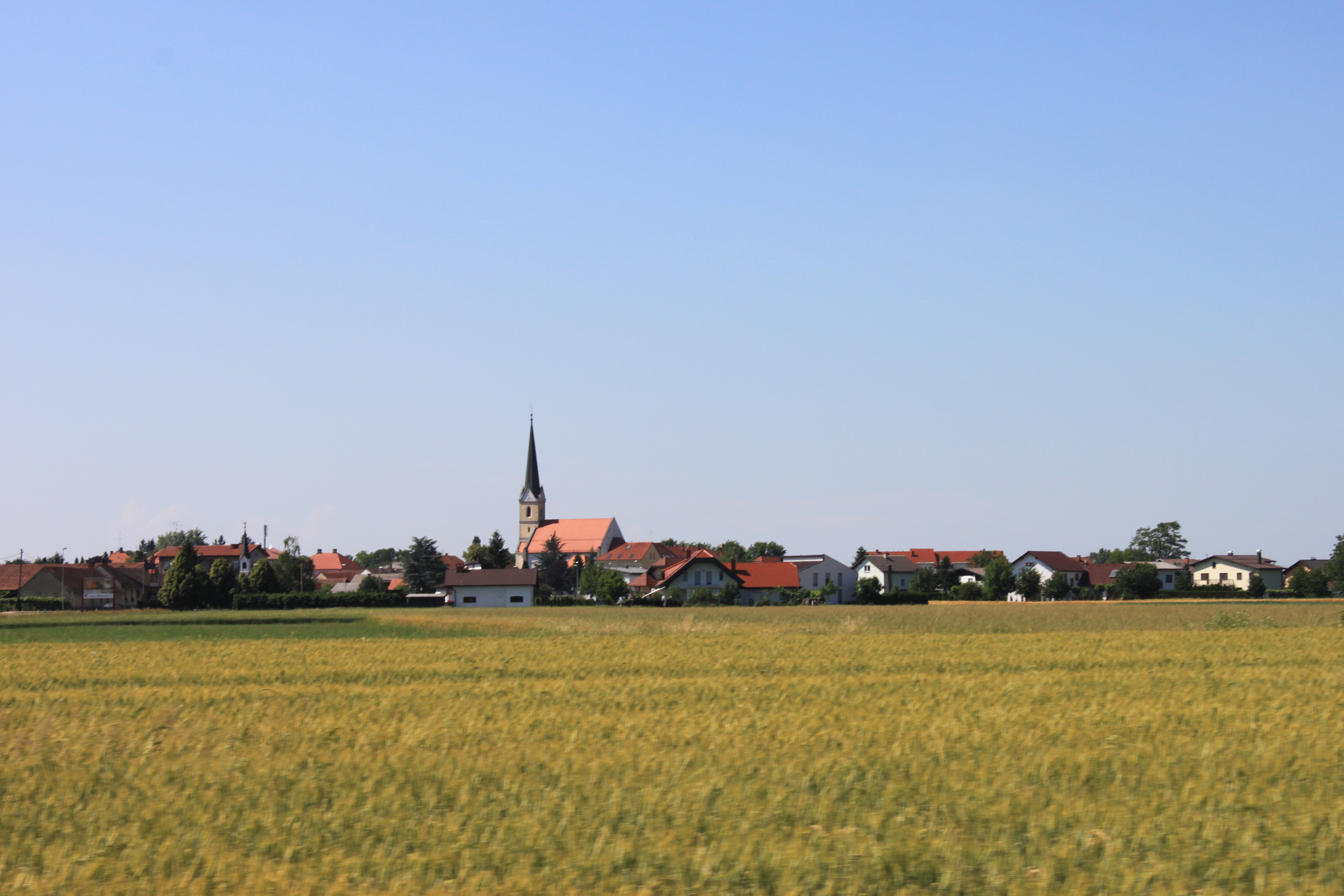

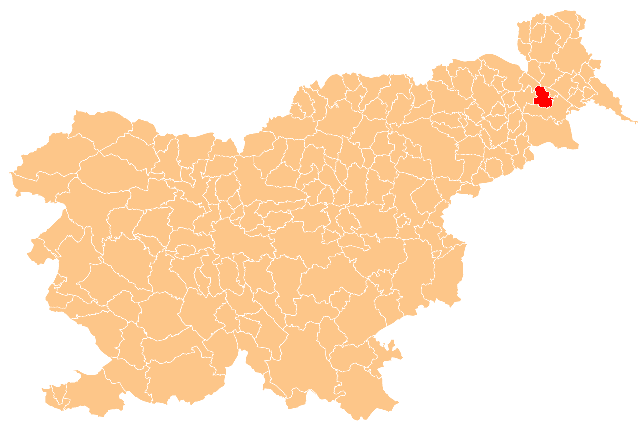
- Location of the Municipality of Križevci in Slovenia
- Coordinates: 46°33′N 16°08′E
- Country: Slovenia

Government
  - Mayor: Feliks Mavrič (Independent)

Area
  - Total: 46.2 km^{2} (17.8 sq mi)

Population (2002)
  - Total: 3,663
  - Density: 79.3/km^{2} (205/sq mi)
- Time zone: UTC+01 (CET)
  - Summer (DST): UTC+02 (CEST)
- Website: www.obcina-krizevci.si

The Municipality of Križevci (pronounced [ˈkɾiːʒɛu̯tsi]; Slovene: Občina Križevci) is a municipality in the Prlekija region in eastern Slovenia. It gets its name from the largest settlement and administrative seat of the municipality, Križevci pri Ljutomeru. It is part of the traditional region of Styria and is now included in the Mura Statistical Region.

== Settlements ==
In addition to the municipal seat of Križevci pri Ljutomeru, the municipality also includes the following settlements:

- Berkovci
- Berkovski Prelogi
- Boreci
- Bučečovci
- Dobrava
- Gajševci
- Grabe pri Ljutomeru
- Iljaševci
- Ključarovci pri Ljutomeru
- Kokoriči
- Logarovci
- Lukavci
- Stara Nova Vas
- Vučja Vas
- Zasadi
