= Krapje, Ljutomer =

Krapje
- Location in Slovenia
- Coordinates: 46°33′36.31″N 16°12′22.44″E
- Country: Slovenia
- Traditional region: Styria
- Statistical region: Mura
- Municipality: Ljutomer

Area
  - Total: 4.6 km^{2} (1.8 sq mi)
- Elevation: 177.3 m (582 ft)

Population (2002)
  - Total: 315

Krapje (pronounced [ˈkɾaːpjɛ], German: Krapping) is a settlement on the right bank of the Mura River in the Municipality of Ljutomer in northeastern Slovenia. It is divided into two distinct hamlets, Zgornje Krapje and Spodnje Krapje (literally, 'upper and lower Krapje'). The area is part of the traditional region of Styria and is now included in the Mura Statistical Region.

There are two chapels in the settlement, one in Zgornje Krapje and one in Spodnje Krapje. Both are Neo-Gothic chapels, built in the late 19th century.
