= Berkovci, Križevci =

Village in northeast Slovenia, part of Styria

Berkovci
- Location in Slovenia
- Coordinates: 46°33′2.69″N 16°4′42.55″E
- Country: Slovenia
- Traditional region: Styria
- Statistical region: Mura
- Municipality: Križevci

Area
  - Total: 2.27 km^{2} (0.88 sq mi)
- Elevation: 190 m (620 ft)

Population (2002)
  - Total: 134

Berkovci (pronounced [ˈbeːɾkɔu̯tsi], German: Werkofzen) is a village in the Municipality of Križevci in northeastern Slovenia. The area is part of the traditional region of Styria. It is now included with the rest of the municipality in the Mura Statistical Region.

A small chapel in the settlement was built in the late 19th century.
