= Kokoriči =

- Location in Slovenia
- Coordinates: 46°33′4.33″N 16°5′48.31″E
- Country: Slovenia
- Traditional region: Styria
- Statistical region: Mura
- Municipality: Križevci

Area
  - Total: 1.28 km^{2} (0.49 sq mi)
- Elevation: 189.7 m (622 ft)

Population (2002)
  - Total: 134

Kokoriči (pronounced [kɔˈkoːɾitʃi], German: Kokoritschen) is a village in the Municipality of Križevci in northeastern Slovenia. The municipality is part of the traditional region of Styria and is now included in the Mura Statistical Region.

A small Neo-Gothic chapel in the settlement was built in 1891.
