= Mojca Senčar =

Slovenian physician (1940–2019)

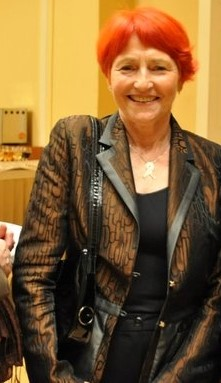
Mojca Senčar (2010)

Mojca Senčar (4 April 1940 – 26 May 2019) was a Slovene physician who specialized in oncology, palliative care, and the regulation of euthanasia. In 2005, she was selected as Slovene Woman of the Year.

== Biography ==
Mojca Senčar was born in Ljutomer, 4 April 1940. She worked at the Institute of Oncology in Ljubljana. After her retirement and completing treatment for breast cancer, she took over the management of the Slovenian branch of Europa Donna. During the later years of her life, she was particularly vocal about the importance of palliative care and the regulation of euthanasia. Senčar died in Ljubljana, 26 May 2019.

== Awards ==
- 2005, Slovene Woman of the Year
