= Tabori Movement =

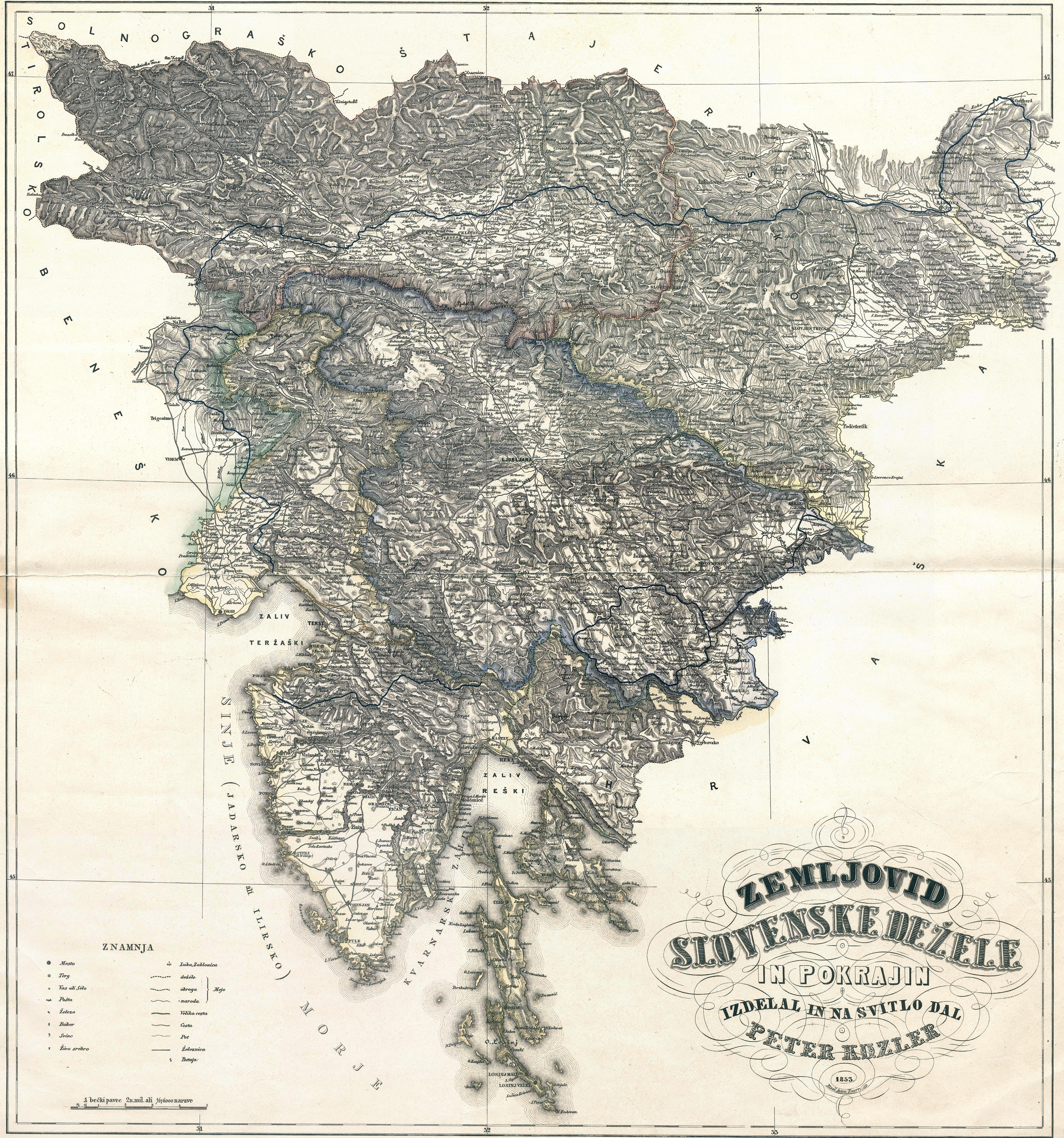
Peter Kosler's Map of the Slovene Land and Provinces, designed during the Spring of Nations in 1848, became the symbol of United Slovenia.

In 1867 the Austrian Empire reorganized with the Austro-Hungarian Compromise into a dual monarchy, in light of this, many Slovenes reverted into their "maximalist" ways, with a demand of a "United Slovenia", they initiated a series of mass political rallies, called tabori, after the Czech model. The movement led to a call for political/cultural union of Slovenes.

Slovenes, Croats, and Serbs followed closely the liberation and unification such as in Italy, Germany, Greece, and Serbia. While Austria lost its northern Italian provinces, it gained in Bosnia, which led to a movement for unification of South Slavic groups, (Yugoslavs), into a third unit within Austria Hungary.

== Resolution of August 9th 1868 ==
The first rally organized with the initiative of Matija Prelog in Ljutomer, around 7,000 people gathered.

The following resolution was adopted during the camp:

The Slovenian nation gathered here unanimously declares that it cannot find a guarantee for the preservation and cultivation of its nationality in Article 19 of the basic constitutions of the state, until:

1. Slovenian is the exclusive official language in Slovenia, and a deadline is immediately set in Slovenia for this purpose, namely half a year, by which all officials must be able to speak and write Slovenian.
2. The ecclesiastical government should hold office and preach in the Slovenian language.
3. Slovenian should become a subject of study, classes should be held in Slovenian.
4. Slovenians should unite in United Slovenia.
5. Slovenian secondary schools and vocational schools should be built and maintained by institutions.
6. The individual provinces should be granted greater autonomy.

== See also ==
- United Slovenia
- Slovenian National Party
- Slovenian nationalism
