= Bučkovci =

- Location in Slovenia
- Coordinates: 46°32′6.1″N 16°3′23.99″E
- Country: Slovenia
- Traditional region: Styria
- Statistical region: Mura
- Municipality: Ljutomer

Area
  - Total: 2.87 km^{2} (1.11 sq mi)
- Elevation: 205 m (673 ft)

Population (2002)
  - Total: 124

Bučkovci (pronounced [butʃˈkoːu̯tsi]) is a settlement in the Municipality of Ljutomer in northeastern Slovenia. The area belongs to the traditional region of Styria and is now included in the Mura Statistical Region.
