= Ante Trstenjak =

Slovenian psychologist, painter and illustrator

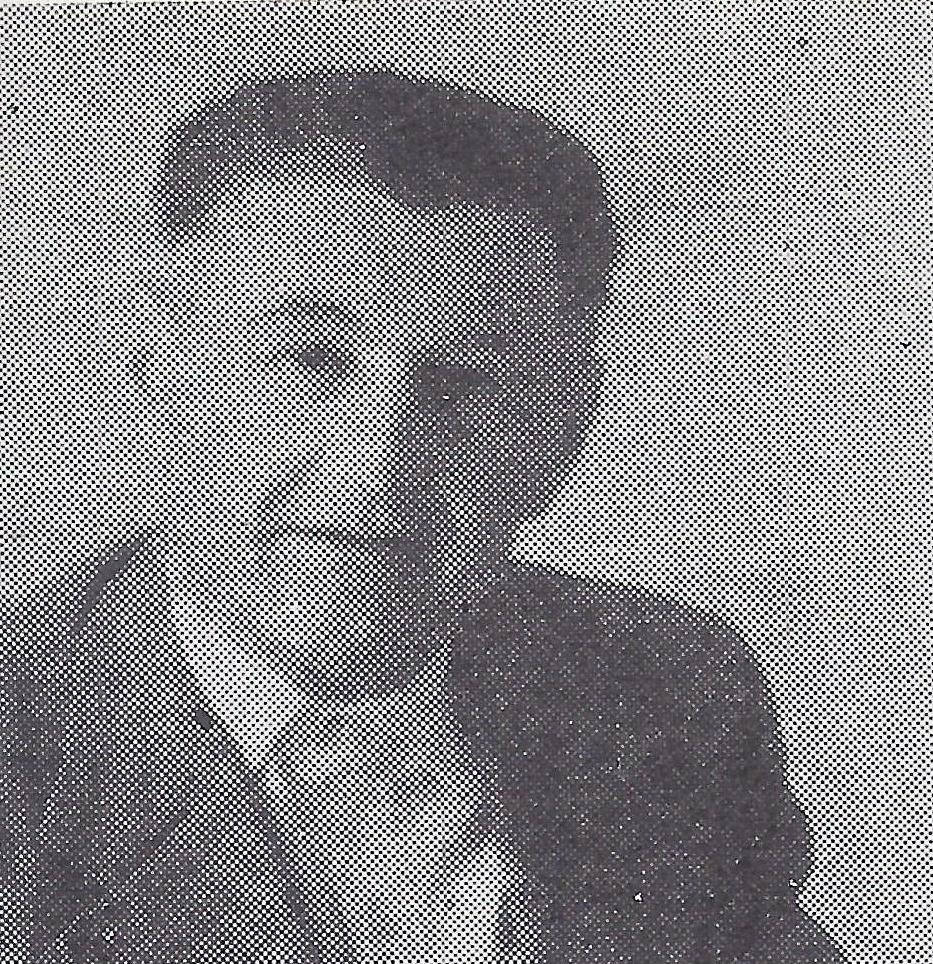
Ante Trstenjak

Ante Trstenjak (29 December 1894 – 4 December 1970) was a Slovenian psychologist, painter and illustrator. He used mostly watercolour and oils. The art gallery in Ljutomer is named after him. He was born in Slamnjak.

== Paintings ==
- Deklica (Girl)
- Tihožitje (Still Life)
- Oljke na Rabu (Olive Trees on Rab)
