= Ljutomer =

- Town
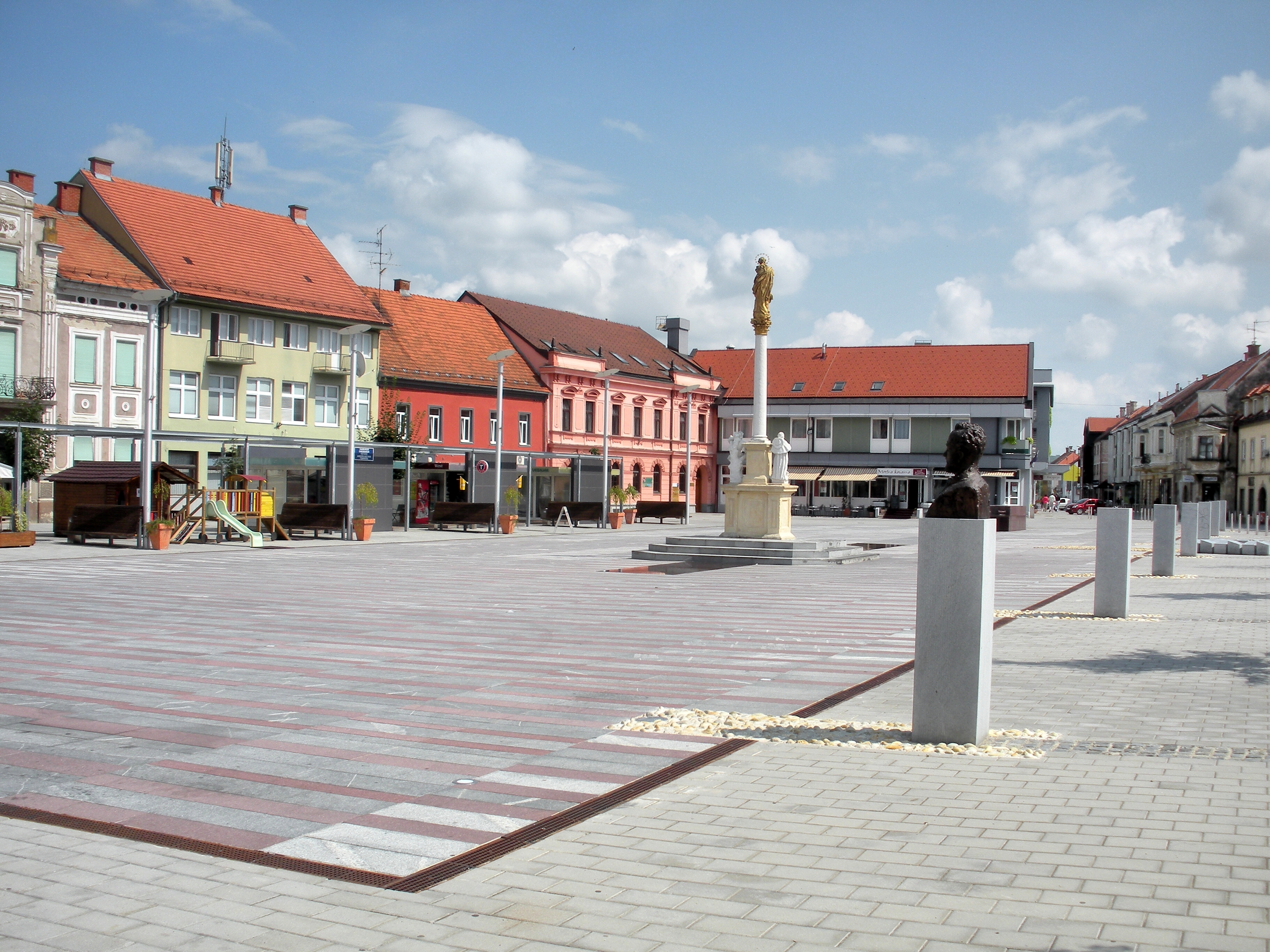
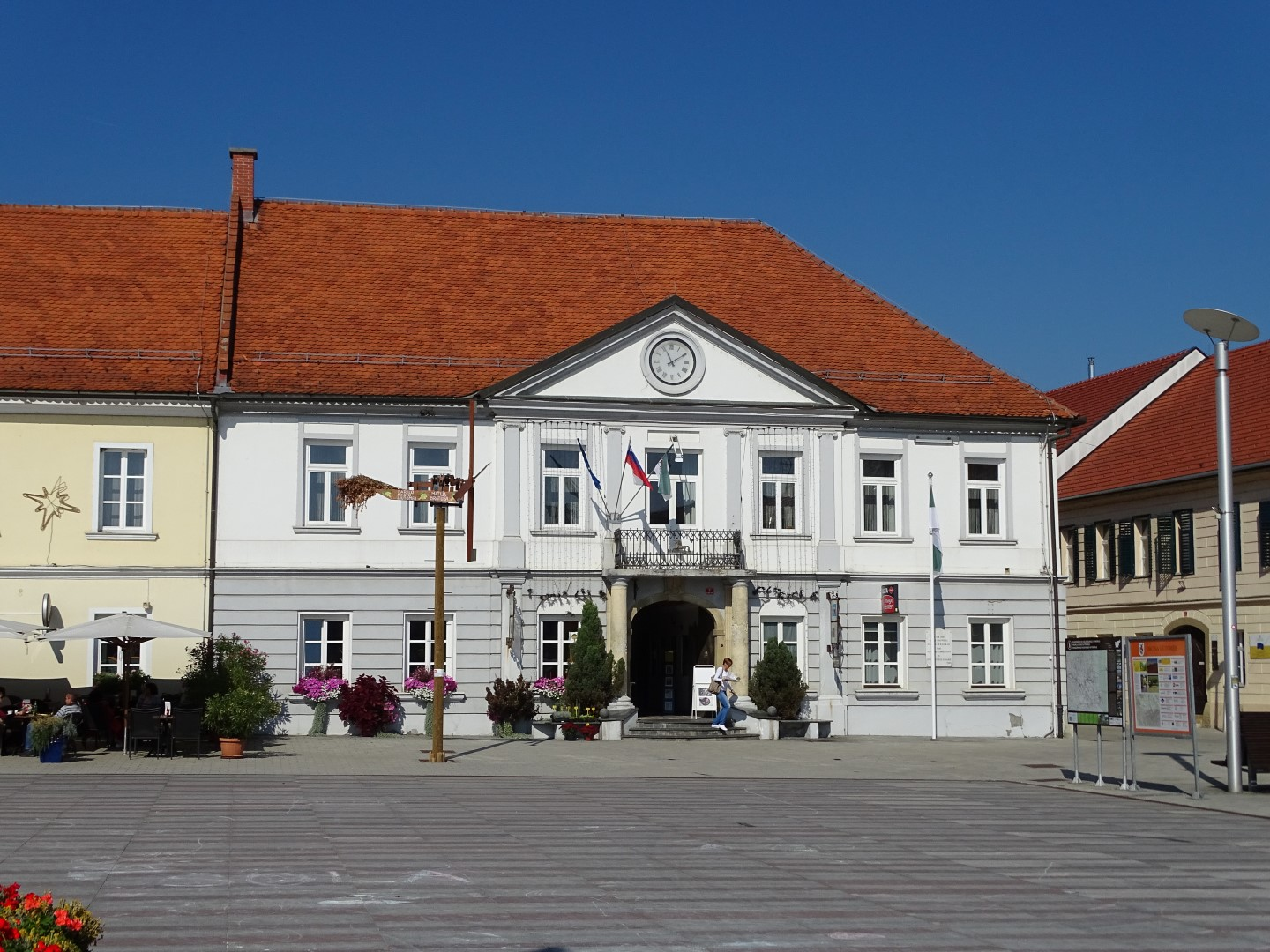
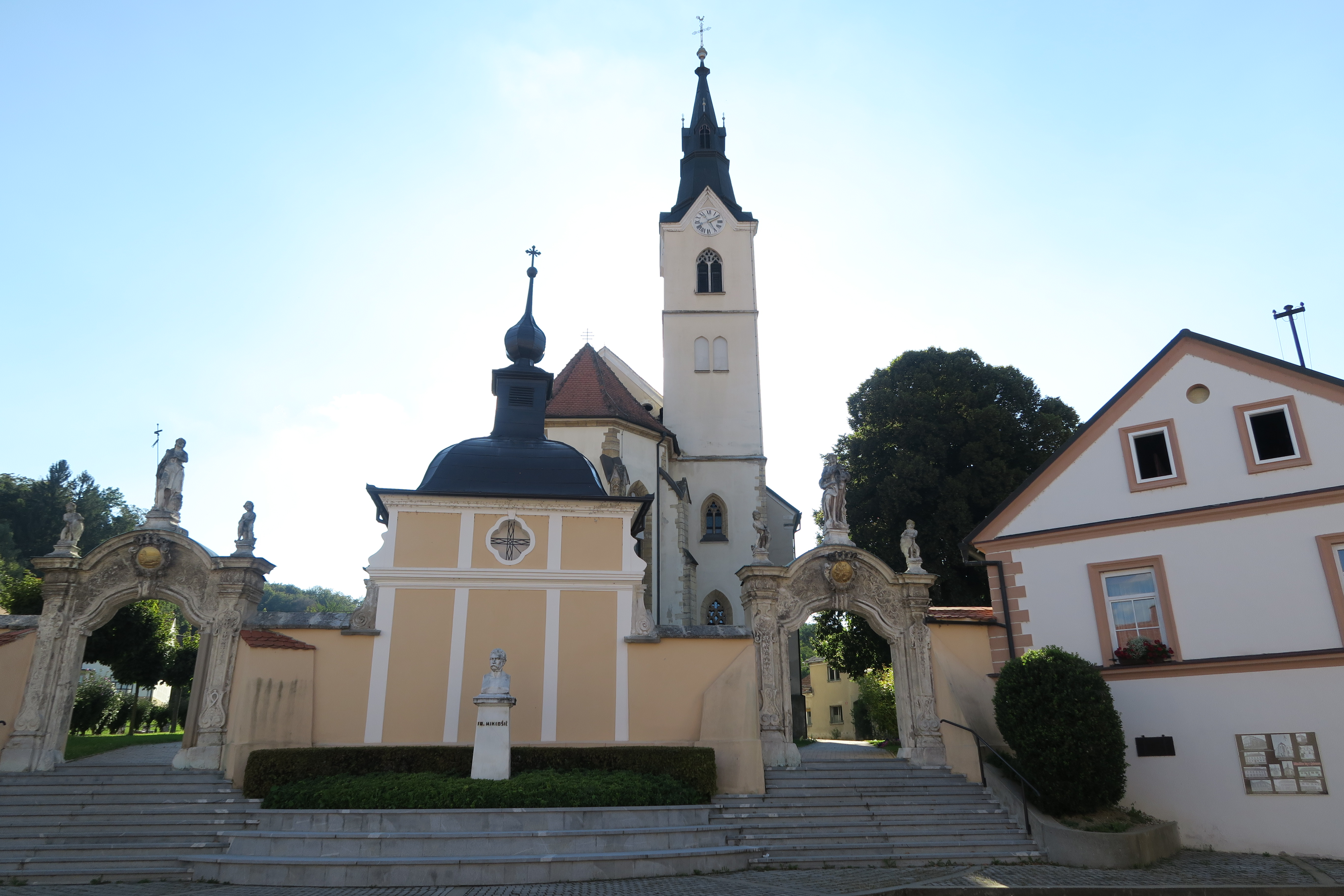
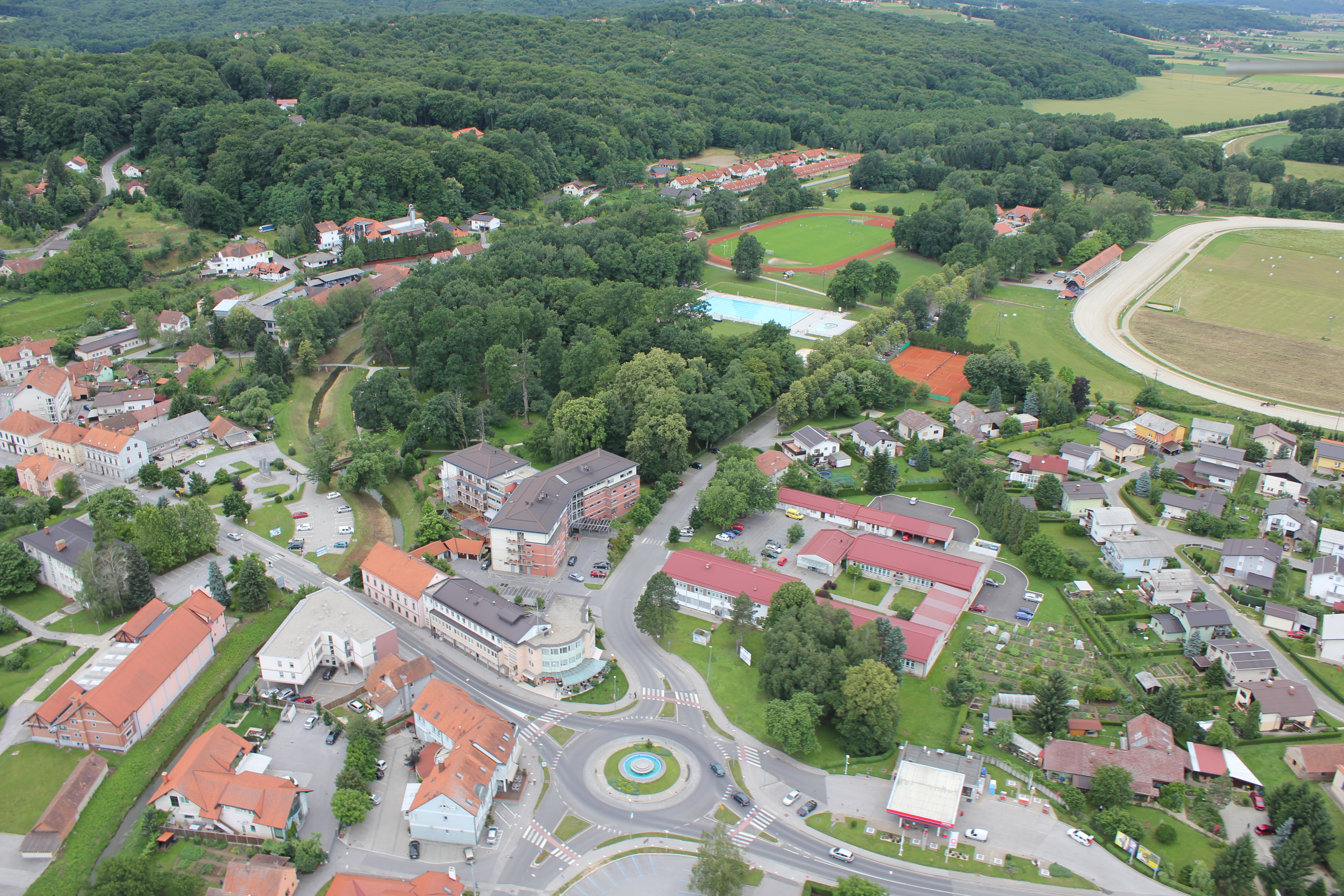
- From top, left to right: Ljutomer's Center, Town Hall, St. John's Church, Outer part of town

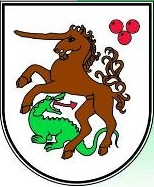
- Coat of arms

- Location in Slovenia
- Coordinates: 46°31′0.33″N 16°12′9.60″E
- Country: Slovenia
- Traditional region: Styria
- Statistical region: Mura
- Municipality: Ljutomer

Government
  - Mayor: Olga Karba

Area
  - Total: 8.00 km^{2} (3.09 sq mi)
- Elevation: 171.5 m (563 ft)

Population (2023)
  - Total: 3,244
- Vehicle registration: MS
- Climate: Dfb

Ljutomer (pronounced [ˈljúːtɔmɛɾ]; German: Luttenberg) is a town in northeastern Slovenia, 40 km (25 mi) east of Maribor. It is the seat of the Municipality of Ljutomer. Traditionally it was part of the region of Styria. It is now included in the Mura Statistical Region. The economy of Ljutomer is largely based on grape farming and wine making.

== Name ==
Ljutomer was attested in written records in 1211 as Lvtenwerde (and as Lůtenwerde in 1242, Lvtenberch in 1249, Lutenberg in 1269, Luetemberg in 1380, and Lutemberg in 1440). The names with -berg referred to the town itself, and those with -werd to the wider area. Until the early 19th century, the only Slovene name for the town was Lotmerk, borrowed from German. The modern Slovene name was first coined by Stanko Vraz in a letter from 1838, in which he wrote "do Ljutmera" ('to Ljutomer'). This and other variations were created by adherents of the Illyrian movement, with Ljutomer becoming established circa 1858, under the mistaken idea that the town's name was derived from that of a Slavic tribe known as the *L'utoměriťi. The German name Lut(t)enberg was the first attested, although it is not known whether this is based on a Slavic borrowing or is purely Germanic. Locally, the town is known as Lotmerg, or more recently Lotmerk as a secondary form.

== History ==
Ljutomer lies at the heart of the Prlekija region. It was first mentioned as a settlement in written documents dating back to 1242. In 1265 it was granted market rights. It was devastated by the plague and numerous fires, and it also had to defend itself against Ottoman and Hungarian raids. The first mass rally (tabor) in support of a United Slovenia took place in Ljutomer in 1868. Before 1918, the town had a substantial German-speaking minority: in 1910, 46% of the inhabitants of the town were German speakers. The surroundings, on the other hand, were almost exclusively Slovene-speaking. Ljutomer was given town status in 1927. The tradition of the Slovenian national awakening of the 19th century is continued by the town library, town museum, and the art gallery.

Historical population
Year	Pop.	±%
1948	1,655	—
1953	1,964	+18.7%
1961	2,033	+3.5%
1971	2,656	+30.6%
1981	3,314	+24.8%
1991	3,658	+10.4%
2002	3,413	−6.7%
2011	3,460	+1.4%
2021	3,308	−4.4%
Population size may be affected by changes in administrative divisions.

=== Mass grave ===
After the Second World War, Yugoslav military police (KNOJ) and secret police (OZNA) murdered between 9 and 12 wealthy citizens of Ljutomer and disposed of their bodies in the Babji Ložič Mass Grave (Slovene: Grobišče Babji Ložič). A cross nearby marks the mass grave north of Ščavnica Creek in the Babji Ložič Woods in the northeastern part of the settlement.

== Architecture ==
There are three main squares in the city centre, each with its own shrine:

- On Old Square (Slovene: Stari trg) there is a small chapel dedicated to Saint Anne. It was built in 1756 and remodelled in 1853 with wall paintings of Saint Anthony and Saint Florian on the side walls.
- On Main Square (Slovene: Glavni trg) the monumental shrine is dedicated to the Virgin Mary and, in addition to the virgin on the top of the column, it bears statues of Saint Roch and Saint Sebastian at its base. It was erected in 1729 by the mayor, Matjaž Petek. It was renovated in 1854.
- On Miklosich Square (Slovene: Miklošičev trg) there is a small chapel dedicated to Saint Florian. It was built in 1736 as part of the walled church enclosure.

The parish church in the town is dedicated to John the Baptist. It is an originally Gothic building that was adapted in the late 17th century to a triple-naved Baroque building with a walled enclosure.

== Notable people ==
- Mojca Senčar (1940–2019), physician
- Franc Gorza, singer
