= Mura Statistical Region =

Coordinates: 46°39′00″N 16°10′00″E

Mura Statistical Region pomurska statistična regija
- Statistical region
- Municipalities: 27
- Largest city: Murska Sobota

Area
  - Total: 1,337 km^{2} (516 sq mi)

Population (2020)
  - Total: 114,238
  - Density: 85.44/km^{2} (221.3/sq mi)

Statistics
  - Households: 44776
  - Employed: 33623
  - Registered unemployed: 9094
  - College/university students: 4133
  - Regional GDP (2019): EUR 1,796 bn (EUR 15,705 per capita)
- HDI (2022): 0.868 very high · 11th

The Mura Statistical Region (Slovene: pomurska statistična regija) is a statistical region in northeast Slovenia. It is predominantly agricultural with field crops representing over three-quarters of the total agricultural area (twice as much as the Slovene average). Climate and soil combined have made it the region with the highest crop production, but its geographical position and inferior infrastructure put it at a disadvantage and it is the region of Slovenia with the lowest GDP per capita (EUR 12,267) and the highest rate of registered unemployment.

== Cities and towns ==
The Mura Statistical Region includes four cities and towns, the largest of which is Murska Sobota.

| Rank | Name | Population (2021) |
|---|---|---|
| 1. | Murska Sobota | 11,025 |
| 2. | Ljutomer | 3,308 |
| 3. | Gornja Radgona | 3,103 |
| 4. | Lendava | 2,947 |

== Municipalities ==
The Mura Statistical Region comprises the following 27 municipalities:

- Apače
- Beltinci
- Cankova
- Črenšovci
- Dobrovnik
- Gornja Radgona
- Gornji Petrovci
- Grad
- Hodoš
- Kobilje
- Križevci
- Kuzma
- Lendava
- Ljutomer
- Moravske Toplice
- Murska Sobota
- Odranci
- Puconci
- Radenci
- Razkrižje
- Rogašovci
- Šalovci
- Sveti Jurij ob Ščavnici
- Tišina
- Turnišče
- Velika Polana
- Veržej

== Demographics ==
The population in 2020 was 114,238. It has a total area of 1,337 km^{2}.

== Economy ==
Employment structure: 57.3% services, 39.9% industry, 2.7% agriculture.

=== Tourism ===
It attracts 10.2% of the total number of tourists in Slovenia, most being from Slovenia (62.4%).

== Transportation ==
- Length of motorways: 64.5 km
- Length of other roads: 3,103.5 km
