= Jože P. Damijan =

Slovene economist

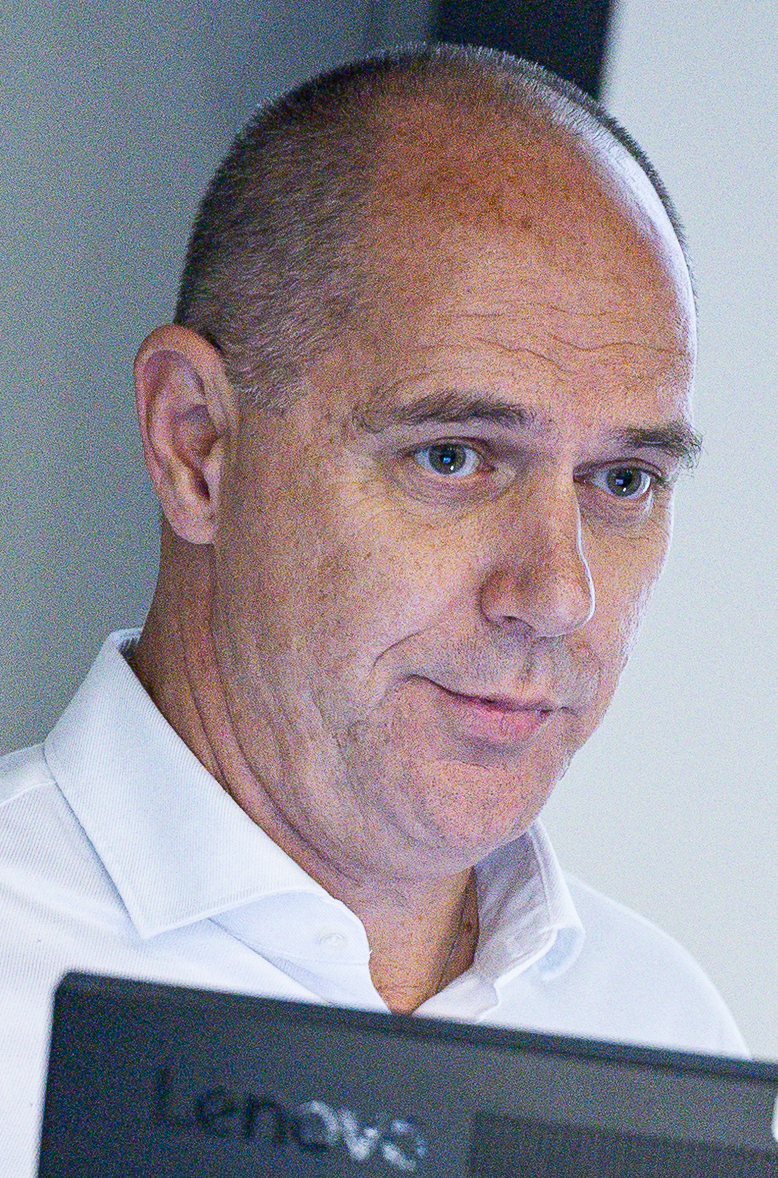

Minister without portfolio
- In office 20 December 2005 – 21 March 2006
- Premier: Janez Janša (First Janša Cabinet)
- Succeeded by: Žiga Turk

Personal details
- Born: 14 January 1967 (age 59) Lomanoše, Slovenia, Yugoslavia
- Occupation: Economist, university professor

Academic background
- Education: University of Ljubljana (BSc 1992, MSc 1995); University of Kiel (PhD 1998)

Academic work
- Discipline: International economics, Macroeconomics
- School or tradition: New Keynesian economics
- Institutions: Ljubljana School of Economics and Business

Jože P. Damijan (full name: Jože Pavlič Damijan) (born 14 January 1967 in Lomanoše, SR Slovenia, SFR Yugoslavia) is a Slovenian economist and politician.

Damijan is a tenured professor at the Ljubljana School of Economics and Business (a constituent faculty of the University of Ljubljana).

Damijan briefly served as minister without portfolio in the First Janša Cabinet. In his ministerial capacity, he was responsible for "coordinating and supervising the country's development strategy implementation". In 2018, Damijan was a contender for the Bank of Slovenia governor position. In October 2020, Damijan was put forth by four left-of-centre opposition parties as a prospective consensus prime ministerial candidate for a proposed technocratic government after Damijan and a group of prominent Slovene civil society figures proposed it to parliamentary parties as an alternative to the controversial Third Janša Government, a political project they termed The Coalition of the Constitutional Arch.

== Biography and career ==
=== Early life ===
Jože Pavlič Damijan was born in Gornja Radgona in 1967, to Jože, a construction foreman, and Marija, a cook. According to Damijan, his family was working class and politically anti-communist. The family was largely deprived of land holdings during the Yugoslav post-WWII nationalisation and collectivisation process, and discussions about the faults of communism were a constant in the family.

Damijan attended elementary school in the nearby town of Lomanoše and lived with his grandparents during his early childhood until his mother could build her own house. From 1982 to 1986, Damijan attended high school in Murska Sobota. He graduated at the Ljubljana School of Economics in 1992.

=== Academic career ===
In 1992, Damijan became a post-graduate researcher at the Ljubljana School of Economics, later an international economics research assistant, and a research fellow at the Institute for Economic Research. He obtained a master's degree in 1995 with the dissertation An Analysis of Economic Characteristics of Small Countries in World Markets, which was published as a book the following year. He obtained a PhD in 1998, completing his doctoral studies at the University of Kiel in Germany. His doctoral thesis was titled The Influence of Economies of Scale on Foreign Market Specialisation. In 2005, he became an associate professor of international economics.

Damijan is a visiting professor at the University of Leuven, Belgium. Damijan is one of the most frequently cited Slovenian academics.

=== Political career ===
During the early-to-mid 2000s, Damijan rose to public prominence as one of the so-called young economists, a group of Slovenian economists who advocated privatisation, liberalisation, and a flat tax. The young economists came to be favoured for political appointments by right-of-centre political parties of the era. Damijan has since renounced his earlier neoliberal economic beliefs.

In 2018, Damijan was put forward as a prospective candidate for the position of governor of the Bank of Slovenia, with the backing of left-of-centre political parties.

Over the course of his career, Damijan has served as an economic advisor to various ministries of the Slovenian Government, and the National Assembly. He has also worked on international research and consultancy projects funded by the European Commission, World Bank, the United Nations, and OECD.

==== First Janša government and minister without portfolio ====
During the First Janša Government (2004–2008), Damijan served as the head of the governmental Board of Reforms, and as the vice-president of the Council of Economic Advisors to the Prime Minister, followed by a stint as minister without portfolio, responsible for development strategy.

In 2005, in his capacity as the head of the Board of Reforms, Damijan tabled a proposal for flat tax rates and an increase of the retirement age to age 70. Damijan also envisaged the privatisation of state-owned enterprises, and the "withdrawal of the state from the economy". The flat tax proposal encompassed a flat income tax, flat value added tax, and flat corporate income tax. Damijan advocated the introduction of flat tax rates to reduce the cost of labour, which was, according to Damijan, far to high given Slovenia's level of productivity, leading to detrimental effects on employment.

Damijan resigned from his ministerial post in March 2006 - only 3 months after assuming the position - citing personal reasons. Damijan later revealed that he resigned because he grew disillusioned by what he saw as a kleptocratic administration, using their official functions as a "smokescreen" for personal enrichment with the aim of "never having to work again in their lives".

==== Prospective PM candidate ====
In October 2020, Damijan presented the representatives of parliamentary opposition parties with an initiative drafted by himself (and a number of prominent members of the Slovene civil society, including Spomenka Hribar, Pavel Gantar, Boris A. Novak, and Slavoj Žižek). The initiative called on political actors to intervene to halt what they see as an irrevocable drift towards illiberal democracy underway under PM Janša's stewardship of the state. All four opposition party leaders endorsed the initiative. The initiative was entitled The Coalition of the Constitutional Arch, drawing its name from the eponymous the post-WWII compact in Italian politics that ostracised neo-fascist political forces from government. All ruling political parties remained committed to the principal for the duration of the First Italian Republic, ending when Silvio Berlusconi entered into a governing coalition with a neo-fascist political party in 1994.

During deliberations on who could be the prospective PM candidate for the initiative to lend legitimacy to the political project, Damijan, as the principal signatory and presenter of the initiative, was asked whether he would be willing to take on the role of a consensus PM candidate. Damijan acquiesced to the request and become the favourite. Public opinion polling of the Slovenian public has revealed that a majority of those polled support the initiative, with Damijan enjoying significant public support as alternative PM.

=== Private sector work ===
Damijan, along with his wife, is a partner in the professional services company Grant Thornton Slovenia, and has, in this capacity, worked for a number of state companies and institutions.

== Personal life ==
Damijan is married to Sandra Damijan, a fellow economics professor and a corporate and financial crime expert. For over a decade, Damijan has been publishing a popular economics blog (one of the most widely read blogs in the country).

=== Political views ===
An economic liberal at the time of his ministerial work, Damijan has radically shifted his political economy outlook over the course of his life and career, coming to advocate a greater role of government in the economy. Damijan has more recently promoted such measures as increasing the minimum wage, a universal basic income, funding infrastructure projects with public debt, more stringent government regulation of the economy, and greater government involvement in the economy and financial systems.

Damijan has questioned the initial wisdom of introducing, and the long-term feasibility of maintaining, the Eurozone (at least in its present configuration), at times advocating abandoning the Euro altogether. In 2016, Damijan stated: "The Euro is dead. It was a big mistake. It buried European integration. The EU crisis would have passed quickly if we didn't have the Euro and the senseless rules regarding fiscal consolidation. The Euro should be dismantled in a controlled manner to mimise the fallout."
