= Politia =

Politia may refer to:

- Politia, a neighbourhood in the suburb of Kifissia, Athens, Greece
- Poliţia Română, the Romanian police force

== See also ==
- Politeia (disambiguation)
- Policy (disambiguation)
- Police (disambiguation)
