= List of South Carolina suffragists =

This is a list of South Carolina suffragists, suffrage groups and others associated with the cause of women's suffrage in South Carolina.

== Suffragists ==
- A. Viola Neblett (1842–1897) – activist, suffragist, women's rights pioneer.
- Anita Pollitzer (1894–1975) – photographer, served as National chairman in NWP.
- Carrie Teller Pollitzer (1881–1974) – educator
