= Pulitzer =

Pulitzer may refer to:

- Joseph Pulitzer, a 19th century media magnate
- Pulitzer Prize, an annual U.S. journalism, literary, and music award
- Pulitzer (surname)
- Pulitzer, Inc., a U.S. newspaper chain
- Pulitzer Center on Crisis Reporting, a non-profit organization for journalists
- National Air Races, also known as the Pulitzer Trophy Races

== See also ==
- Politzer (disambiguation)
- Politz (disambiguation)
- Pollitz, Germany
