= Ivanjski Vrh, Gornja Radgona =

Ivanjski Vrh
- Location in Slovenia
- Coordinates: 46°35′27.34″N 15°57′42.59″E
- Country: Slovenia
- Traditional region: Styria
- Statistical region: Mura
- Municipality: Gornja Radgona

Area
  - Total: 0.73 km^{2} (0.28 sq mi)
- Elevation: 277.9 m (912 ft)

Population (2020)
  - Total: 160
  - Density: 220/km^{2} (570/sq mi)

Ivanjski Vrh (pronounced [iˈʋaːnski ˈʋəɾx], German: Iswanzenberg) is a small dispersed settlement in the hills south of Gornja Radgona in northeastern Slovenia.
