= Orehovski Vrh =

- Location in Slovenia
- Coordinates: 46°38′48.52″N 15°59′29.63″E
- Country: Slovenia
- Traditional region: Styria
- Statistical region: Mura
- Municipality: Gornja Radgona

Area
  - Total: 1.77 km^{2} (0.68 sq mi)
- Elevation: 269.2 m (883 ft)

Population (2020)
  - Total: 117
  - Density: 66.1/km^{2} (171/sq mi)

Orehovski Vrh (pronounced [ɔˈɾeːxɔu̯ski ˈʋəɾx]) is a dispersed settlement in the hills south of Gornja Radgona in northeastern Slovenia.
