= Ivanjševci =

Ivanjševci is a Slovene place name that may refer to:

- Ivanjševci, Moravske Toplice, a village in the Municipality of Moravske Toplice, northeastern Slovenia
- Ivanjševci ob Ščavnici, a village in the Municipality of Gornja Radgona, northeastern Slovenia
