= Carrie Teller Pollitzer =

- Born: December 5, 1881, Charleston, South Carolina
- Died: October 22, 1974, Charleston, South Carolina
- Occupations: Educator, Suffragist
- Writing career
- Notable awards: Charleston's Federation of Women's Clubs's Hall of Fame

Carrie Teller Pollitzer (December 5, 1881 – October 22, 1974) was an American Suffragist, educator, founder, organizer, and director. She was an active member of Charleston's Federation of Women's Club, National Woman's Party, Free Kindergarten Association, and the Charleston Equal Suffrage League. She also was a leader in Charleston's Progressive Movement.

== Early life and education ==
Carrie Teller Pollitzer was born on December 5, 1881, to Gustave and Clara Pollitzer in Charleston, South Carolina. Gustave was a was a successful cotton broker, and both of Pollitzer's parents were active within their local synagogue, Kahal Kadosh Beth Elohim. Pollitzer had three younger siblings, Mabel, Anita, and Richard.

When she was young, Pollitzer attended a private kindergarten. Later on, she attended Memminger Normal School and graduated in 1901. After graduating, she studied education at Teachers College, Columbia University. She began to teach kindergarten at the New York Kindergarten Association for two years; she went back to Charleston in 1908.

== Career ==
=== Teacher ===
Upon returning to Charleston, she worked for the South Carolina Kindergarten Training School. While working, Pollitzer realized how much of a disadvantage the South Carolinian children were compared with the children from New York. There were no medical examinations, and the students did not have enough money to pay for their lunches. Pollitzer decided to hire two pediatricians (one of them was her brother) to examine the children and Carrie visited the children's homes to inform their parents if there were any medical issues with their child. She also decided to charge five cents for two graham crackers and a glass of milk to help feed the students for lunch. Parents were overjoyed with these new changes.

In the 1920s, Pollitzer was appointed as assistant principal of the South Carolina Kindergarten Training School. As assistant principal, she established public health programs, teacher visits to students' homes, kindergarten lunches, parental-involvement programs, and physical exams. Around this time, Pollitzer also established the first free kindergarten program in Charleston in a carriage house behind her family home on Pitt Street. Later on, she established another free kindergarten program which also incorporated health and nutrition into the curriculum.

In 1930, Charleston's Kindergarten Association was low on funds, Politzer founded the Annual Community Children's Festival at Colonial Lake (Charleston, South Carolina). For the next twenty-three years, the festival brought in over 1,000 participants with many attractions like a petting zoo, games, a carousel, and parades while Pollitzer served as director. All of the proceeds from the festival went to the Charleston's Kindergarten Association.

=== Suffragist ===
In 1912, Pollitzer would go out and stand on the corner of King and Broad streets and would give out pamphlets to the public to educate them about the Suffrage Movement. Later on, she served as secretary and as membership chair for the Charleston Equal Suffrage League. The League's purpose was to involve themselves is social and political reformation in Charleston. This included establishing libraires, investigating labor conditions, organizing housing settlements, and expanding schools. At this time, Pollitzer was also a member of the executive board of the Charleston's Federation of Women's Club.

In 1917, Pollitzer released a petition as an executive member to the College of Charleston to have women admitted into the school. However, the president of the school, Harrison Randolph, stated that they did not have the proper funds to construct amenities for women such as a women's lounge, a matron, and a women's restroom. The estimated amount was $1,200 in order to have start construction and have women admitted. Pollitzer and a group of women went to many houses in Charleston to raise money. Pollitzer also held a mass meeting at the Chamber of Commerce where no woman had ever been inside of before. Pollitzer was able to raise over $1,500 and in the following year, thirteen women were enrolled to the College of Charleston.

== Legacy and personal life ==
In 1973, Pollitzer and her sister, Mabel, were inducted into the Charleston's Federation of Women's Clubs' Hall of Fame. they were recognized by the Charleston chapter of the National Organization for Women for their contributions for women's rights. Pollitzer remained active with the Free Kindergarten Association for the rest of her life.

Pollitzer and Mabel lived in their family home in Charleston and would often visit their sister, Anita, and her family in New York City.

Carrie Teller Pollitzer died on October 22, 1974.
