= Kunova =

- Location in Slovenia
- Coordinates: 46°35′43.91″N 15°56′56.84″E
- Country: Slovenia
- Traditional region: Styria
- Statistical region: Mura
- Municipality: Gornja Radgona

Area
  - Total: 3.11 km^{2} (1.20 sq mi)
- Elevation: 280.3 m (920 ft)

Population (2020)
  - Total: 146
  - Density: 46.9/km^{2} (122/sq mi)

Kunova (pronounced [ˈkuːnɔʋa], German: Kanadorf or Kanaberg) is a dispersed village in the hills south of Gornja Radgona in northeastern Slovenia.
