= Pollitzer =

Pollitzer is a surname. Notable people with the surname include:

- Adolf Pollitzer (1832–1900), a Hungarian Jewish violinist
- Alois Pollitzer, original name of Louis Treumann (1872–1943), Austrian actor and operetta tenor
- Anita Pollitzer, American photographer
- Mabel Pollitzer (1885–1979), American educator and suffragist
- Marcel Pollitzer, French writer
- William S. Pollitzer, American anatomist

== See also ==
- Politzer
