= Rodmošci =

- Location in Slovenia
- Coordinates: 46°38′0.53″N 15°57′42.96″E
- Country: Slovenia
- Traditional region: Styria
- Statistical region: Mura
- Municipality: Gornja Radgona

Area
  - Total: 1.3 km^{2} (0.50 sq mi)
- Elevation: 268 m (879 ft)

Population (2020)
  - Total: 47
  - Density: 36/km^{2} (94/sq mi)

Rodmošci (pronounced [ˈɾoːdmɔʃtsi]) is a dispersed settlement southwest of Gornja Radgona in northeastern Slovenia.

== Notable people ==
Notable people that were born or lived in Rodmošci include:

- Anton Trstenjak (1906–1996), psychologist
