= Zbigovci =

- Location in Slovenia
- Coordinates: 46°38′47.21″N 15°58′16.71″E
- Country: Slovenia
- Traditional region: Styria
- Statistical region: Mura
- Municipality: Gornja Radgona

Area
  - Total: 2.75 km^{2} (1.06 sq mi)
- Elevation: 298.4 m (979 ft)

Population (2020)
  - Total: 265
  - Density: 96.4/km^{2} (250/sq mi)

Zbigovci (pronounced [ˈzbiːɡɔu̯tsi]) is a dispersed settlement in the hills south of Gornja Radgona in northeastern Slovenia.
