= Radvenci =

- Location in Slovenia
- Coordinates: 46°37′37.22″N 15°56′24.03″E
- Country: Slovenia
- Traditional region: Styria
- Statistical region: Mura
- Municipality: Gornja Radgona

Area
  - Total: 2.75 km^{2} (1.06 sq mi)
- Elevation: 218.1 m (716 ft)

Population (2020)
  - Total: 145
  - Density: 52.7/km^{2} (137/sq mi)

Radvenci (pronounced [ˈɾaːdʋɛntsi]) is a dispersed settlement southwest of Gornja Radgona in northeastern Slovenia.

There is a small chapel-shrine with a belfry in the settlement. It was built in 1907.
