= Mele, Gornja Radgona =

Mele
- Location in Slovenia
- Coordinates: 46°39′30.25″N 16°1′19.2″E
- Country: Slovenia
- Traditional region: Styria
- Statistical region: Mura
- Municipality: Gornja Radgona

Area
  - Total: 1.87 km^{2} (0.72 sq mi)
- Elevation: 205.5 m (674 ft)

Population (2020)
  - Total: 156
  - Density: 83.4/km^{2} (216/sq mi)

Mele (pronounced [mɛˈleː]; German: Kellerdorf) is a village immediately southeast of Gornja Radgona in northeastern Slovenia.

There is a small chapel-shrine in the settlement. It was built in the early 19th century. It has a pair of Tuscan columns on the front corners holding a pediment, painted at a later date when it was remodelled in a Neo-Gothic style with pointed windows and a small belfry on its steep roof.
