= Plitvički Vrh =

- Location in Slovenia
- Coordinates: 46°39′44.73″N 15°55′56.61″E
- Country: Slovenia
- Traditional region: Styria
- Statistical region: Mura
- Municipality: Gornja Radgona

Area
  - Total: 1.7 km^{2} (0.66 sq mi)
- Elevation: 279.3 m (916 ft)

Population (2020)
  - Total: 167
  - Density: 98/km^{2} (250/sq mi)

Plitvički Vrh (pronounced [pliˈtʋiːtʃki ˈʋəɾx], German: Plippitzberg) is a dispersed settlement in the hills west of Gornja Radgona in northeastern Slovenia.
