= Podgrad, Gornja Radgona =

Podgrad
- Location in Slovenia
- Coordinates: 46°40′52.57″N 15°58′14.25″E
- Country: Slovenia
- Traditional region: Styria
- Statistical region: Mura
- Municipality: Gornja Radgona

Area
  - Total: 1.52 km^{2} (0.59 sq mi)
- Elevation: 209.5 m (687 ft)

Population (2020)
  - Total: 152
  - Density: 100/km^{2} (259/sq mi)

Podgrad (pronounced [pɔdˈɡɾáːt, ˈpɔ̀ːdɡɾat]) is a settlement on the right bank of the Mura River in the foothills of Radgona Castle in the Municipality of Gornja Radgona in northeastern Slovenia.
