= Politz =

Politz or Pölitz may refer to:

- Politz Day School of Cherry Hill, a private Jewish school in Cherry Hill, New Jersey
- Pölitz, a municipality in Schleswig-Holstein, Germany
- Police, West Pomeranian Voivodeship (German: Pölitz), a town in northwestern Poland
- Police nad Metují (German: Politz an der Mettau), a town in the Czech Republic
- Boletice nad Labem (German: Politz an der Elbe), a district of Děčín, Czech Republic

== See also ==
- Police (disambiguation)
- Pollitz
- Politzer, a surname
- Pollitzer, a surname
