= Gornji Ivanjci =

- Village
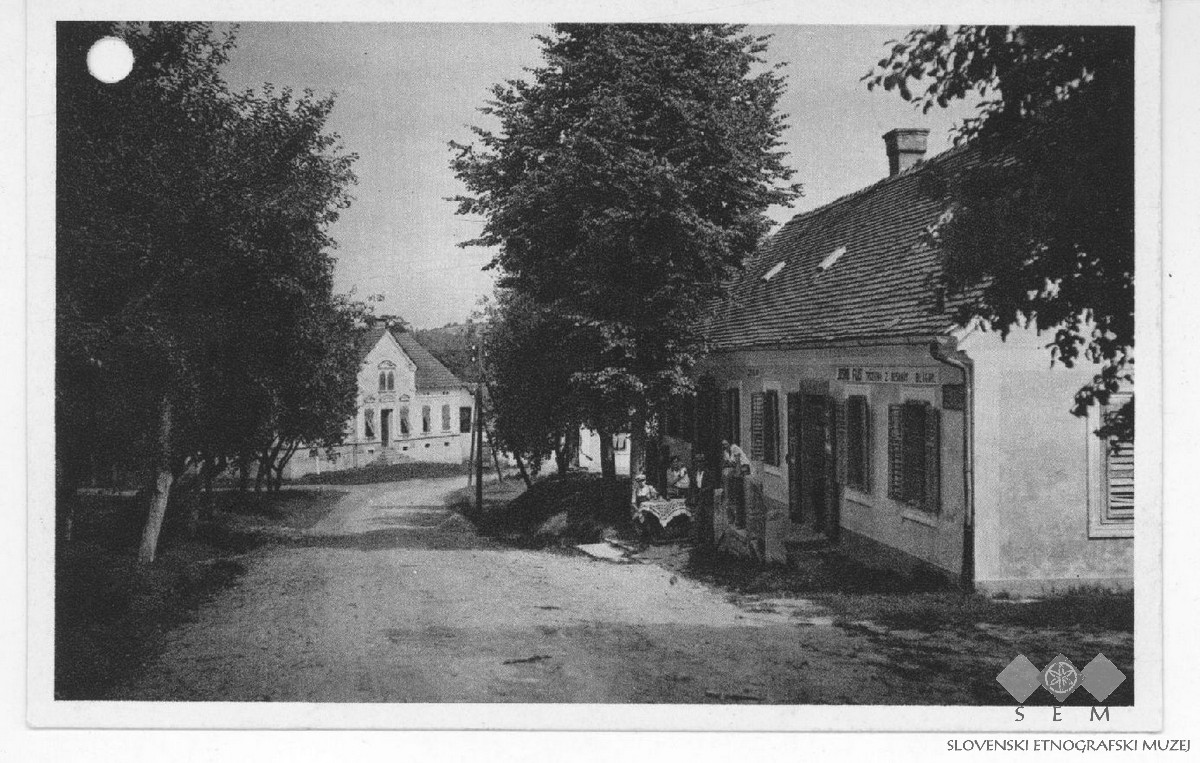
- Postcard of Gornji Ivanjci

- Location in Slovenia
- Coordinates: 46°36′19.24″N 15°58′11.24″E
- Country: Slovenia
- Traditional region: Styria
- Statistical region: Mura
- Municipality: Gornja Radgona

Area
  - Total: 2.99 km^{2} (1.15 sq mi)
- Elevation: 213.1 m (699 ft)

Population (2020)
  - Total: 76
  - Density: 25/km^{2} (66/sq mi)

Gornji Ivanjci (pronounced [ˈɡoːɾnji iˈʋaːntsi], German: Oberiswanzen) is a dispersed settlement in the hills southwest of Gornja Radgona in northeastern Slovenia. A triangular column shrine from the 19th century and a villa from c. 1900 stand in the village.
