= Stavešinski Vrh =

- Location in Slovenia
- Coordinates: 46°37′13.82″N 15°59′6.74″E
- Country: Slovenia
- Traditional region: Styria
- Statistical region: Mura
- Municipality: Gornja Radgona

Area
  - Total: 2.04 km^{2} (0.79 sq mi)
- Elevation: 284.1 m (932 ft)

Population (2020)
  - Total: 146
  - Density: 71.6/km^{2} (185/sq mi)

Stavešinski Vrh (pronounced [ˈstaːʋɛʃinski ˈʋəɾx], in older sources also Stavenski Vrh, German: Pfefferberg) is a settlement north of Stavešinci in the Municipality of Gornja Radgona in northeastern Slovenia.

There is a small chapel-shine in the central part of the village. It was built in 1814.
