= Policy Project =

Use of the shorthand term Policy Project can refer to several organizations, including:

- The Global Water Policy Project (GWPP), a group working to improve global access to fresh water
- The Free Expression Policy Project (FEPP), a civil liberties organization
- The Marijuana Policy Project (MPP), a group advocating for legal reforms on cannabis
- The Science & Environmental Policy Project (SEPP), an organization promoting skepticism of global warming

== See also ==
- Public policy
- Policy (disambiguation)
- Project (disambiguation)
