= Spodnja Ščavnica =

- Location in Slovenia
- Coordinates: 46°38′57.99″N 15°56′8.5″E
- Country: Slovenia
- Traditional region: Styria
- Statistical region: Mura
- Municipality: Gornja Radgona

Area
  - Total: 8.04 km^{2} (3.10 sq mi)
- Elevation: 249.1 m (817 ft)

Population (2020)
  - Total: 464
  - Density: 57.7/km^{2} (149/sq mi)

Spodnja Ščavnica (pronounced [ˈspoːdnja ˈʃtʃaːu̯nitsa]) is a settlement in the upper Ščavnica Valley southwest of Gornja Radgona in northeastern Slovenia.
