= Hercegovščak =

- Location in Slovenia
- Coordinates: 46°40′28.07″N 15°58′39.22″E
- Country: Slovenia
- Traditional region: Styria
- Statistical region: Mura
- Municipality: Gornja Radgona

Area
  - Total: 1.42 km^{2} (0.55 sq mi)
- Elevation: 247.3 m (811 ft)

Population (2020)
  - Total: 148
  - Density: 104/km^{2} (270/sq mi)

Hercegovščak (pronounced [xɛɾˈtseːɡɔu̯ʃtʃak], German: Herzogberg) is a settlement in the hills immediately west of Gornja Radgona in northeastern Slovenia.
