= Anton Trstenjak =

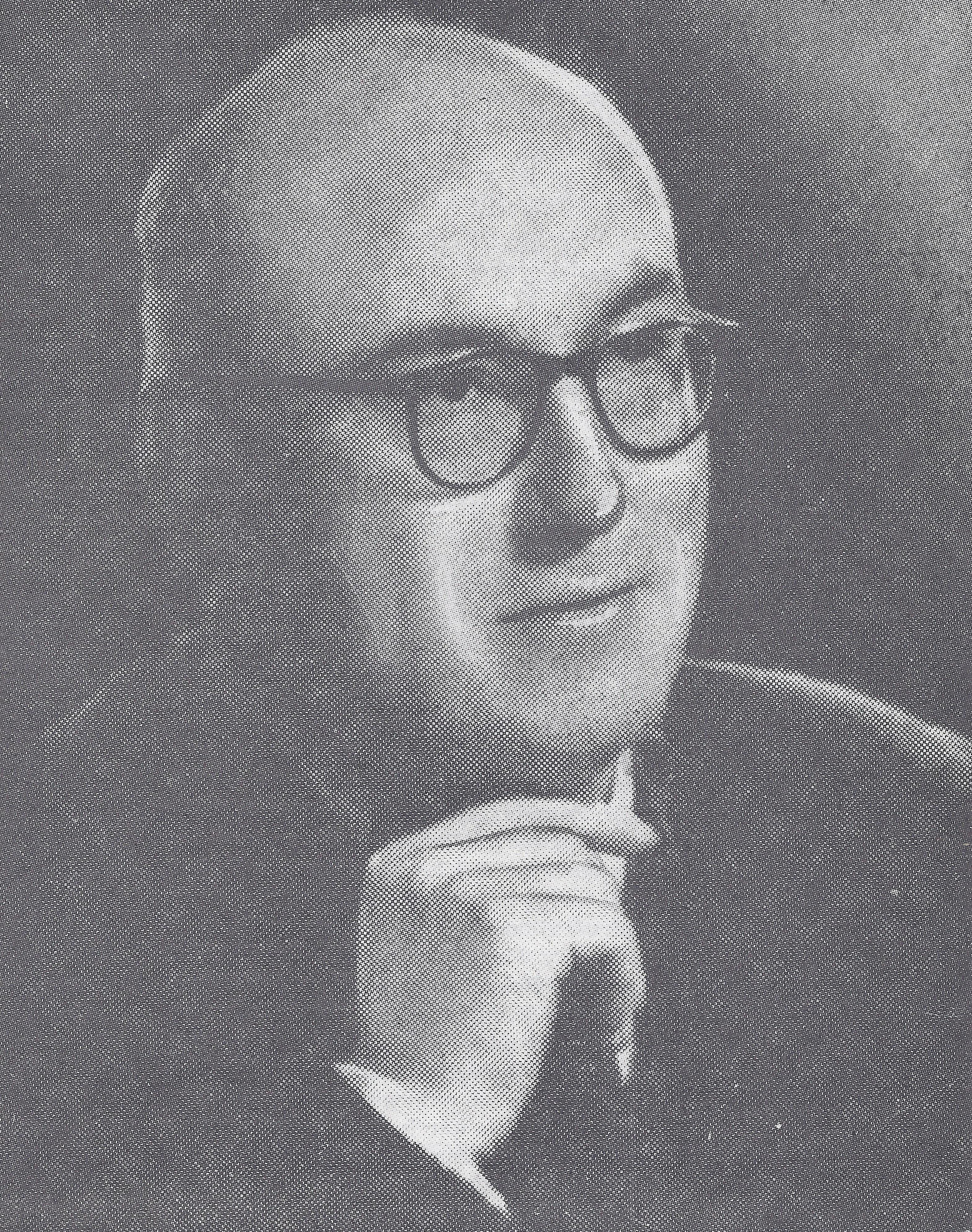
- Born: 8 January 1906; Rodmošci, Austria-Hungary
- Died: 29 September 1996 (aged 90); Ljubljana, Slovenia
- Occupations: Psychologist, theologian, author

Anton Trstenjak (8 January 1906 – 29 September 1996) was Slovene psychologist, theologian, and author. He is notable as a pioneer of Slovenian clinical psychology and was practicing his own logotherapy-inspired psychotherapy. As author he wrote books in specific areas of applied psychology such as ecological psychology, pastoral psychology, psychology of work and organization, and his overview of the field of psychology in general.

== Life ==
Anton Trstenjak was born into a family of small farmers in Rodmošci near Gornja Radgona, at the time part of Austrian Empire, now Slovenia. After elementary school in Negova and high school in Maribor, he went to the University of Innsbruck to become a Roman Catholic priest. However, he first received a doctoral degree in philosophy in 1929, and four years later in theology. He went to study further in Paris between 1935 and 1937, and then to Milan, where he specialized in experimental psychology at Agostino Gemelli between 1941 and 1942.

== Work ==
=== Teaching ===
From 1940 until his retirement in 1973, he taught psychology and philosophy at the Roman Catholic Faculty of Theology in Ljubljana.

=== Experimental psychology of color perception ===
Upon conducting his experiments, he proposed there exists an inverse quantitative relationship between the reaction times, on one hand, and wavelengths, on the other hand, in perception of colors by humans.

=== Membership ===
In 1953, he became a member of the Paris-based International Association for Applied Psychology. In 1979, he became a member of the Slovenian Academy of Sciences and Arts and in 1993 a member of the European Academy of Sciences and Arts.
