= Očeslavci =

- Location in Slovenia
- Coordinates: 46°36′9.26″N 15°59′56.32″E
- Country: Slovenia
- Traditional region: Styria
- Statistical region: Mura
- Municipality: Gornja Radgona

Area
  - Total: 3.12 km^{2} (1.20 sq mi)
- Elevation: 211 m (692 ft)

Population (2020)
  - Total: 174
  - Density: 55.8/km^{2} (144/sq mi)

Očeslavci (pronounced [ɔˈtʃeːslau̯tsi], German: Sulzdorf) is a settlement in the hills south of Gornja Radgona in northeastern Slovenia.
