= Norički Vrh =

- Location in Slovenia
- Coordinates: 46°40′18.19″N 15°58′57.86″E
- Country: Slovenia
- Traditional region: Styria
- Statistical region: Mura
- Municipality: Gornja Radgona

Area
  - Total: 0.54 km^{2} (0.21 sq mi)
- Elevation: 230.1 m (755 ft)

Population (2020)
  - Total: 180
  - Density: 330/km^{2} (860/sq mi)

Norički Vrh (pronounced [nɔˈɾiːtʃki ˈʋəɾx], German: Fahrenbüchel) is a settlement in the suburbs of Gornja Radgona in northeastern Slovenia.

The Kunej Mansion (Slovene: Kunejev dvorec) is a two-story mansion east of the main settlement, first mentioned in written sources dating to the 15th century. It was rebuilt in its current form around 1870 and its landscaped garden dates from 1935.
