= Police (disambiguation) =

Police are organizations established to maintain law and order.

Police may also refer to:

== Arts and entertainment ==
=== Film and TV ===
- Police (1916 film), a film starring Charlie Chaplin
- Police (1985 film), by Maurice Pialat
- Police (2005 film), a Malayalam film by V. K. Prakash
- Police (2020 film), French name of the 2020 Franco-Belgian film called Night Shift in English
- Police (TV series), a 1982 documentary series by Roger Graef

=== Literary arts and music ===
- The Police, an English rock band
  - The Police (album), a 2007 compilation album by the band
- Police (novel), a 2013 crime novel by Jo Nesbø
- The Police (play), by Sławomir Mrożek
- "Police", a 2024 song by Noga Erez from The Vandalist

== Places ==
=== Czech Republic ===
- Police (Šumperk District), a municipality and village in the Olomouc Region
- Police (Třebíč District), a municipality and village in the Vysočina Region
- Police (Vsetín District), a municipality and village in the Zlín Region
- Police nad Metují, a town in the Hradec Králové Region
- Horní Police, a municipality and village in the Liberec Region

=== Poland ===
- Police, West Pomeranian Voivodeship, a town in the north-west
  - Gmina Police, a unit of territorial administration
  - Police County, a unit of territorial administration
  - Port of Police, a seaport on the Oder River in the north-west
- Police, Greater Poland Voivodeship, a village in the west-central
- Police, Lower Silesian Voivodeship, a village in the south-west

=== Slovenia ===
- Police, Cerkno, a village in the municipality of Cerkno
- Police, Gornja Radgona, a village in the municipality of Gornja Radgona

== Other uses ==
- Police (brand), an Italian manufacturer of fashion accessories
- Police F.C. (Rwanda), an association football club

== See also ==
- Police force
- Police officer
- Police state
- Police tactical unit
- Police aviation
- Politz (disambiguation)
- Polizei (disambiguation)
- SWAT, American law enforcement units which use specialized or military equipment and tactics
- Law enforcement
- List of police tactical units
