= Ivanjševski Vrh =

- Location in Slovenia
- Coordinates: 46°37′34.6″N 15°57′44.85″E
- Country: Slovenia
- Traditional region: Styria
- Statistical region: Mura
- Municipality: Gornja Radgona

Area
  - Total: 2.37 km^{2} (0.92 sq mi)
- Elevation: 258.5 m (848 ft)

Population (2020)
  - Total: 84
  - Density: 35/km^{2} (92/sq mi)

Ivanjševski Vrh (pronounced [iˈʋaːnʃɛu̯ski ˈʋəɾx], in older sources Ivanjšovski Vrh, German: Eibersberg) is a dispersed village in the hills east of Radenci in northeastern Slovenia. It is in the territory of the Municipality of Gornja Radgona.
