= Aženski Vrh =

- Location in Slovenia
- Coordinates: 46°39′8.34″N 15°56′50.54″E
- Country: Slovenia
- Traditional region: Styria
- Statistical region: Mura
- Municipality: Gornja Radgona

Area
  - Total: 0.64 km^{2} (0.25 sq mi)
- Elevation: 310.4 m (1,018 ft)

Population (2020)
  - Total: 56
  - Density: 87/km^{2} (230/sq mi)

Aženski Vrh (pronounced [ˈaːʒɛnski ˈʋəɾx], German: Hasenberg) is a settlement in the Municipality of Gornja Radgona in northeastern Slovenia.
