= Lokavci =

- Location in Slovenia
- Coordinates: 46°37′21.9″N 15°55′16.54″E
- Country: Slovenia
- Traditional region: Styria
- Statistical region: Mura
- Municipality: Gornja Radgona

Area
  - Total: 2.75 km^{2} (1.06 sq mi)
- Elevation: 300.4 m (986 ft)

Population (2020)
  - Total: 173
  - Density: 62.9/km^{2} (163/sq mi)

Lokavci (pronounced [lɔˈkaːu̯tsi], German: Lukatz) is a dispersed settlement in the Municipality of Gornja Radgona in northeastern Slovenia.
