= Charcoal drawings by Georgia O'Keeffe from 1915 =

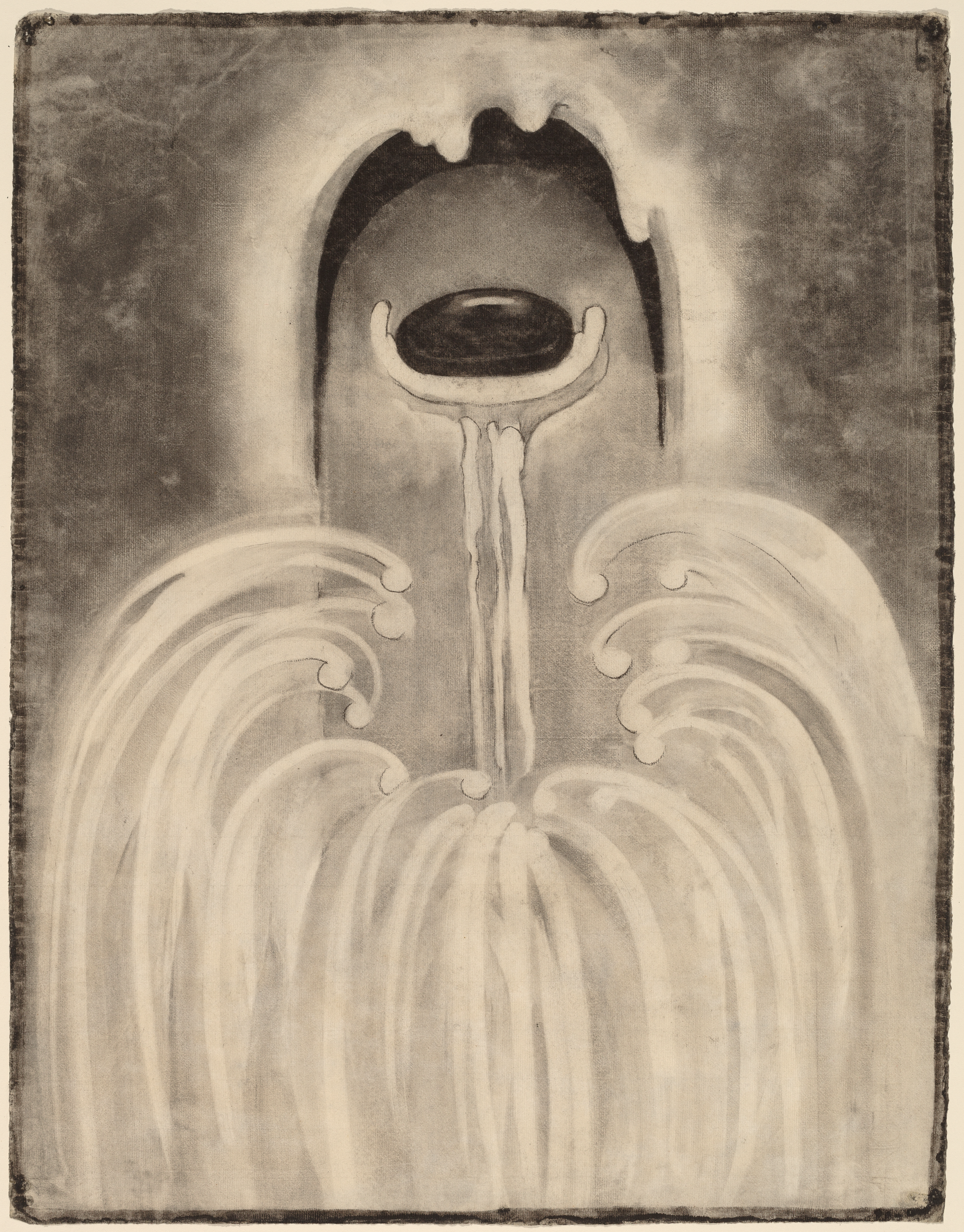
Georgia O'Keeffe, Drawing No. 2 - Special, charcoal on Fabriano laid paper, 60 x 46.3 cm (23 5/8 x 18 1/4 in.), 1915, National Gallery of Art

Charcoal drawings by Georgia O'Keeffe from 1915 represents Georgia O'Keeffe's first major exploration of abstract art and attainment of a freedom to explore her artistic talents based upon what she felt and envisioned. O'Keeffe developed radical charcoal drawings, with just a few lines, that led to greater development of total abstraction. This series of works was completed following three summers of instruction at the University of Virginia on Arthur Wesley Dow's design philosophies, which were highly influential in her development as an abstract artist. Early the following year, photographer and art dealer, Alfred Stieglitz exhibited some of the drawings at his 291 art gallery.

== Background ==
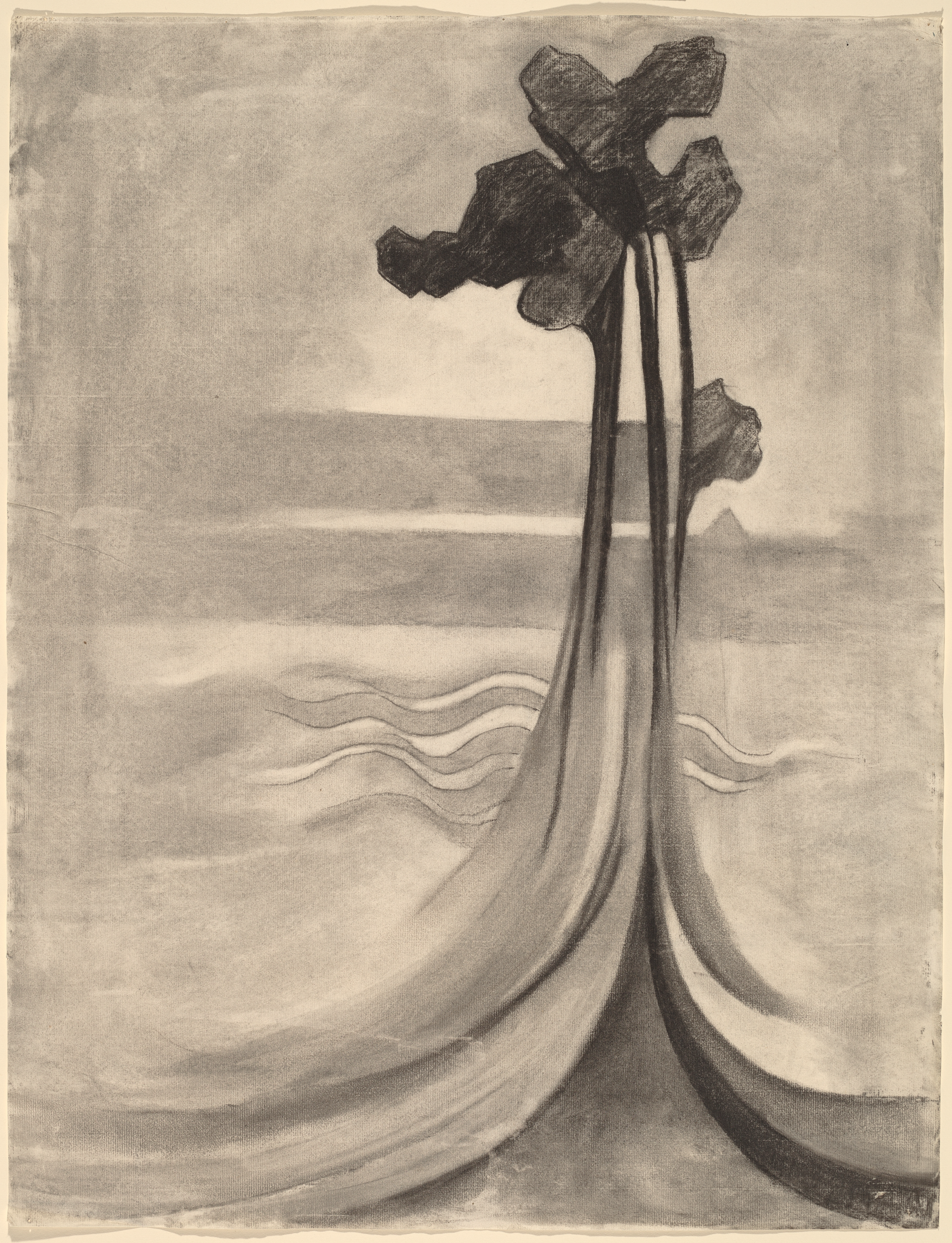
Georgia O'Keeffe, Second, Out of My Head, charcoal on Fabriano laid paper, 61 x 47 cm (24 x 18 1/2 in.), 1915, National Gallery of Art

While teaching at Columbia College in South Carolina, O'Keeffe completed a series of highly innovative charcoal abstractions in 1915, which were unique in their form. Other earlier creators of abstract art used Cubist shapes, but she used the rhythms and shapes that she found in nature to conceptualize her subconscious feelings, which she called the "unknown", to dictate her compositions.

== Overview ==
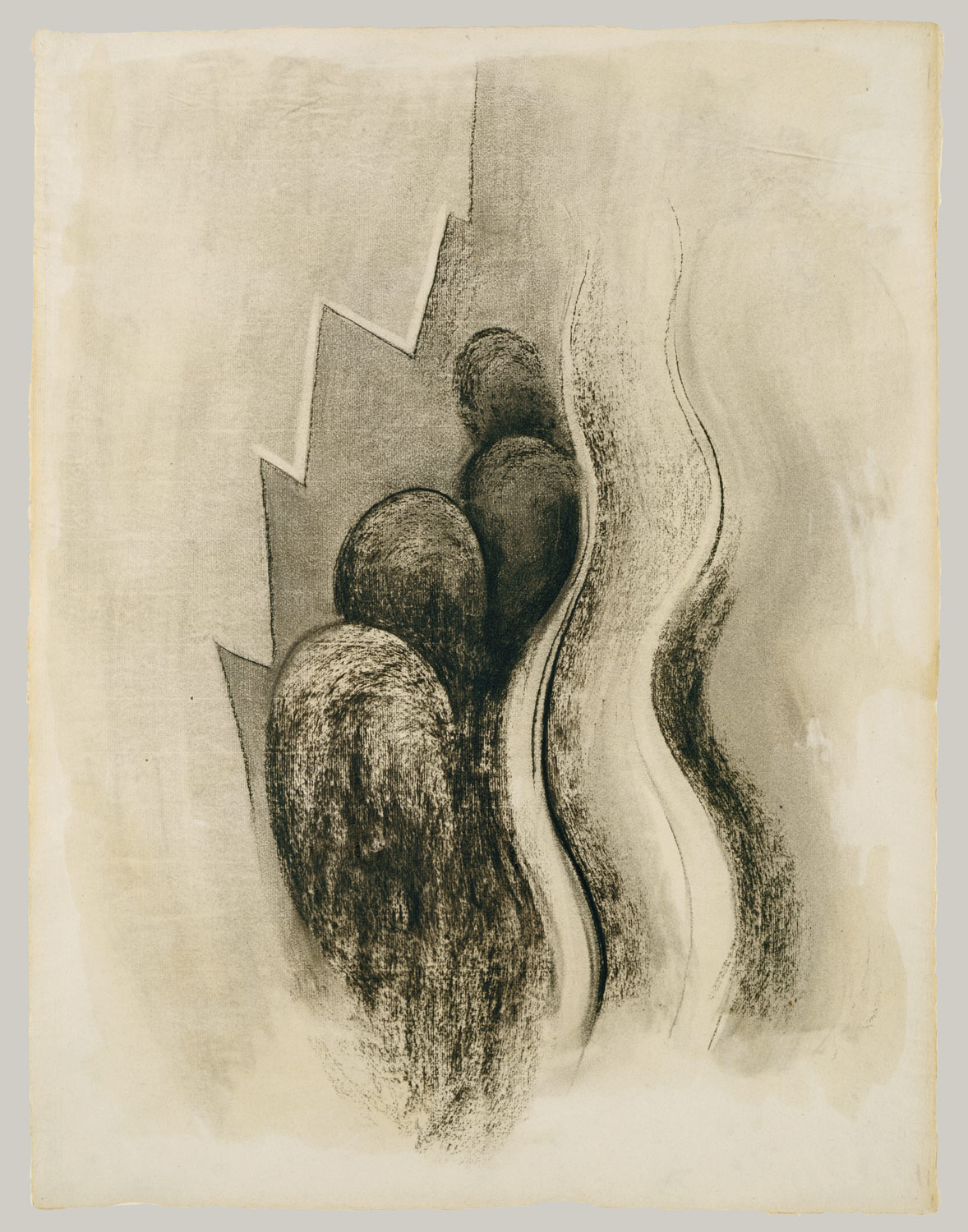
Georgia O'Keeffe, Drawing XIII, 1915, charcoal on paper, 24 3/8 x 18 1/2 in. (61.9 x 47 cm), Metropolitan Museum of Art

Drawing XIII is an example of how O'Keeffe began to develop her own sense of design and composition. A rising flame or flowing river are suggested by the curved line on the right side of the drawing. On the left is a jagged line that seems to represent a lightning strike or mountains. In between the two are four rounded images that appear to be trees or a rolling hillside.

== Exhibit ==
O'Keeffe mailed the drawings to friend and former classmate, Anita Pollitzer, who took them to Alfred Stieglitz at his 291 gallery early in 1916. Stieglitz found them to be the "purest, finest, sincerest things that had entered 291 in a long while", and in April, Stieglitz exhibited ten of her drawings at 291. O'Keeffe was surprised that Stieglitz had not communicated when her work would be shown. She confronted him, but agreed to let exhibit continue.

== Gallery ==
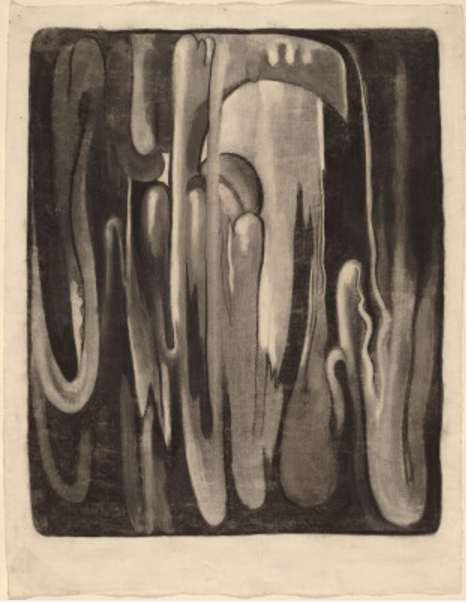
Georgia O'Keeffe, No. 5 Special, 1915, National Gallery of Art

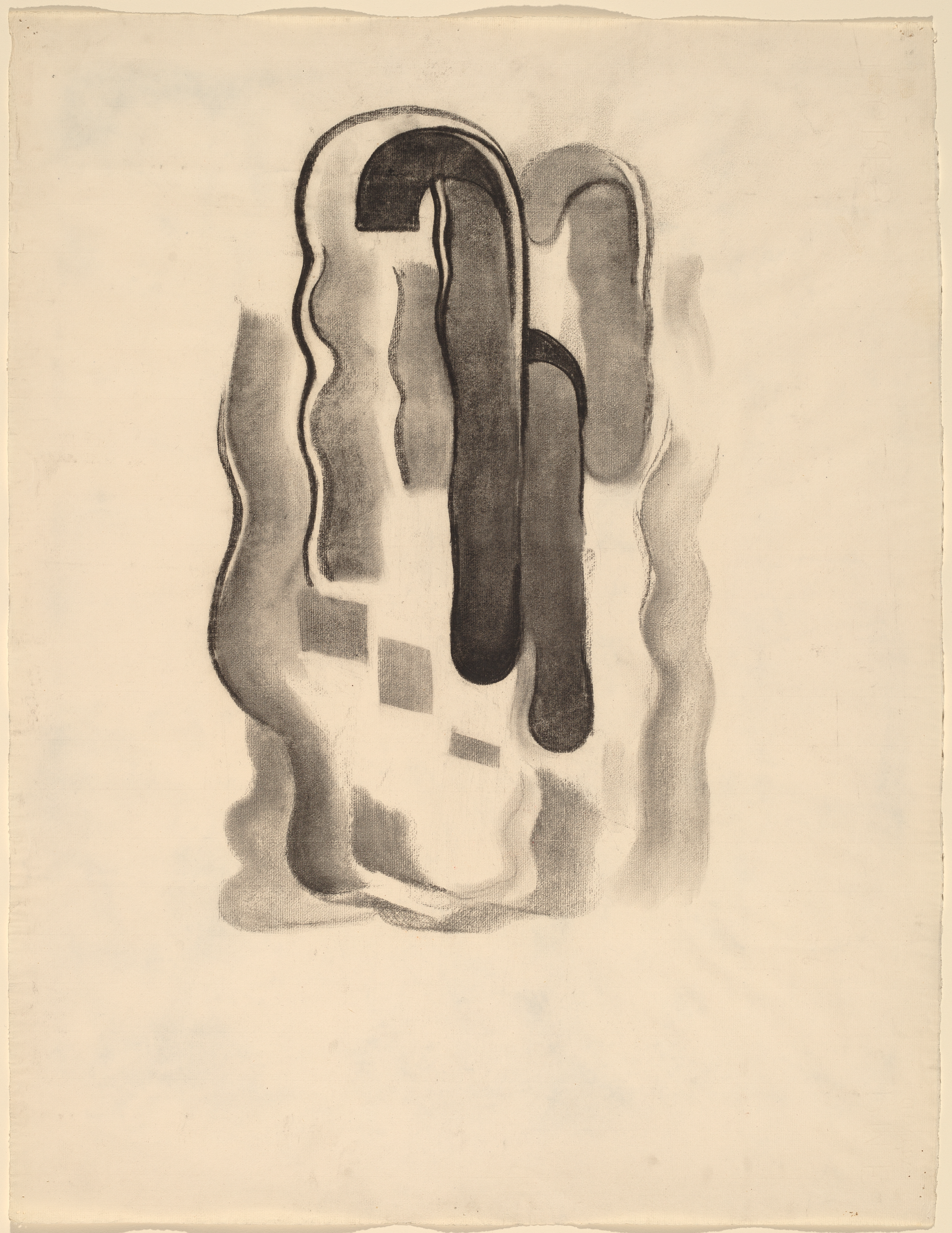
Georgia O'Keeffe, No. 7 Special, 1915, National Gallery of Art

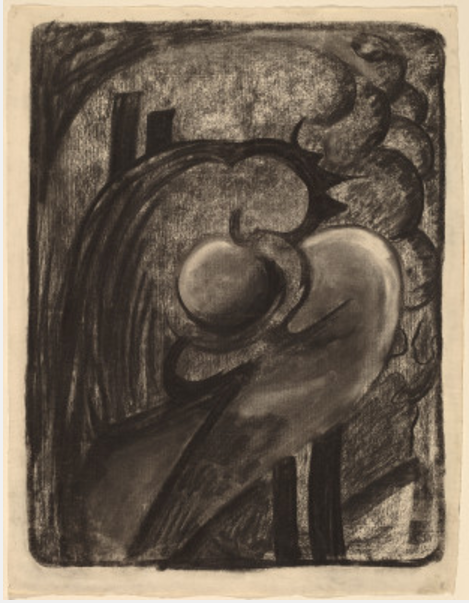
Georgia O'Keeffe, No. 12 Special, 1915, National Gallery of Art

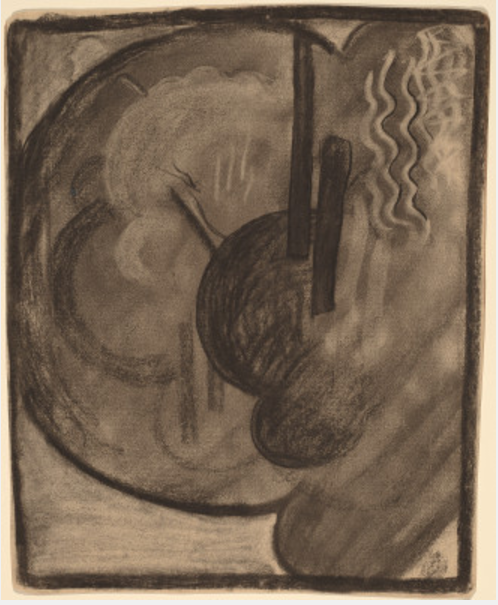
Georgia O'Keeffe, No. 20 From Music Special, 1915, National Gallery of Art
