= Lastomerci =

- Location in Slovenia
- Coordinates: 46°38′15.25″N 15°57′25.82″E
- Country: Slovenia
- Traditional region: Styria
- Statistical region: Mura
- Municipality: Gornja Radgona

Area
  - Total: 2.28 km^{2} (0.88 sq mi)
- Elevation: 264.8 m (869 ft)

Population (2020)
  - Total: 111
  - Density: 48.7/km^{2} (126/sq mi)

Lastomerci (pronounced [lastɔˈmeːɾtsi], German: Lastomerzen) is a dispersed village in the valley of the upper course of the Ščavnica River and the surrounding hills in the Municipality of Gornja Radgona in northeastern Slovenia.
