= Stavešinci =

- Location in Slovenia
- Coordinates: 46°36′26.74″N 15°58′43.33″E
- Country: Slovenia
- Traditional region: Styria
- Statistical region: Mura
- Municipality: Gornja Radgona

Area
  - Total: 1.41 km^{2} (0.54 sq mi)
- Elevation: 212.2 m (696 ft)

Population (2020)
  - Total: 78
  - Density: 55/km^{2} (140/sq mi)

Stavešinci (pronounced [ˈstaːʋɛʃintsi], in older sources also Stavenci, German: Pfefferdorf) is a small village in the Ščavnica Valley in the Municipality of Gornja Radgona in northeastern Slovenia.

There is a small chapel-shrine with an onion-domed belfry just north of the main settlement. It was built in 1922.
