= Guideline (disambiguation) =

Guideline or variant may refer to:

- guideline, a type of documentation
- S-75 Dvina, Soviet surface-to-air missile with the NATO reporting name "SA-2 Guideline"
- guide line, a line laid underwater to guide scuba divers back to a specific point
- Guidelines (film) 2014 Quebec film

== See also ==
- Policy (disambiguation)
