= Politeia (disambiguation) =

Politeia (Greek: πολιτεία) is an Ancient Greek word with no single English translation.

Politeia may also refer to:

== Publications ==
- Republic (Plato) (Greek: Politeia), a book by Plato

== Other uses ==
- Politeia (think tank), centre-right British political think tank
- Politeia (moth), a genus of moths in the family Geometridae
- Politeia, Athens, a neighbourhood in the north of Athens, Greece

== See also ==
- Politics (Aristotle) (Greek: Politiká), a book by Aristotle
- Politia (disambiguation)
