= Police, Gornja Radgona =

Police
- Location in Slovenia
- Coordinates: 46°39′50.53″N 15°57′18.57″E
- Country: Slovenia
- Traditional region: Styria
- Statistical region: Mura
- Municipality: Gornja Radgona

Area
  - Total: 4 km^{2} (1.5 sq mi)
- Elevation: 316.6 m (1,039 ft)

Population (2020)
  - Total: 380
  - Density: 95/km^{2} (250/sq mi)

Police (pronounced [pɔˈliːtsɛ]) is a dispersed settlement in the hills southwest of Gornja Radgona in northeastern Slovenia.
