= Municipality of Gornja Radgona =

Municipality of Slovenia

Municipality of Gornja Radgona Občina Gornja Radgona
- Municipality
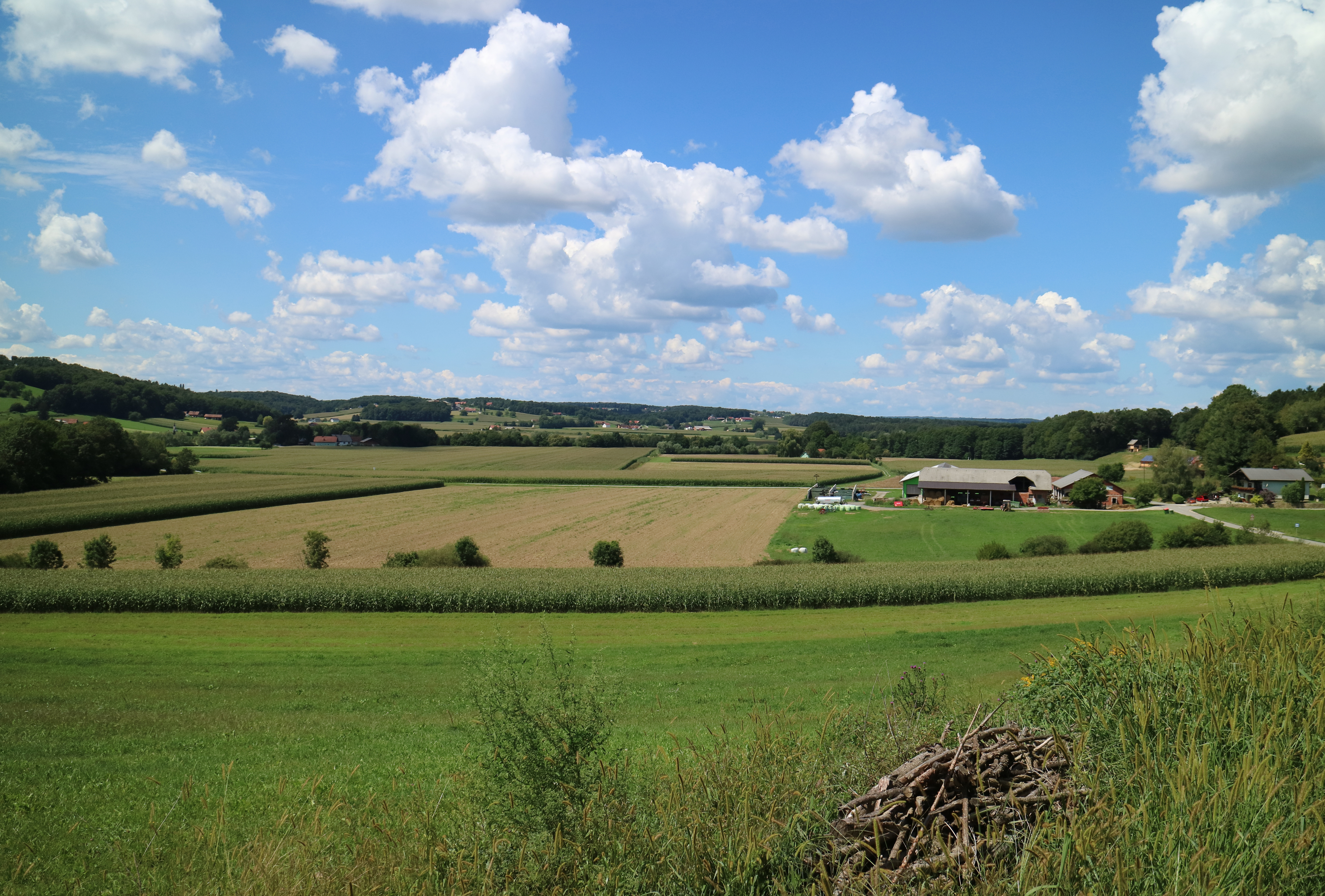

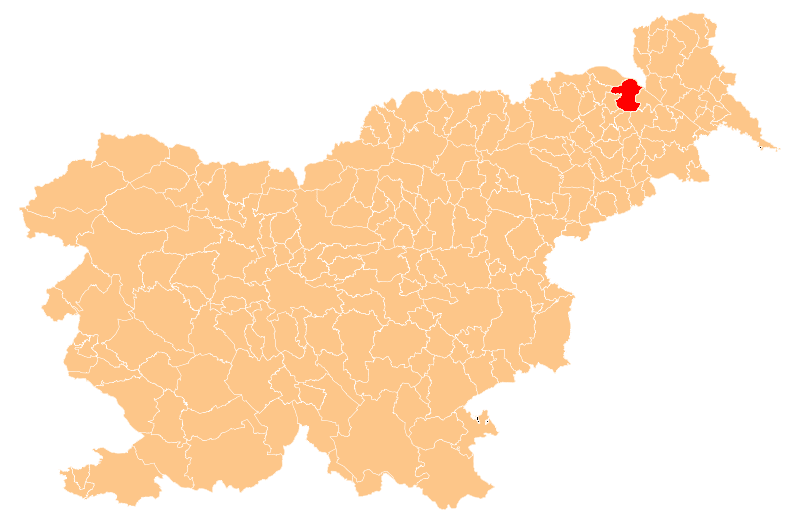
- Location of the Municipality of Gornja Radgona in Slovenia
- Coordinates: 46°40′N 15°59′E
- Country: Slovenia

Government
  - Mayor: Urška Mauko Tuš (Independent)

Area
  - Total: 75 km^{2} (29 sq mi)

Population (2012)
  - Total: 8,617
  - Density: 110/km^{2} (300/sq mi)
- Time zone: UTC+01 (CET)
  - Summer (DST): UTC+02 (CEST)
- Website: www.gor-radgona.si

The Municipality of Gornja Radgona (pronounced [ˈɡoːɾnja ˈɾaːdɡɔna]; Slovene: Občina Gornja Radgona) is a municipality in Slovenia. The seat of the municipality is the town of Gornja Radgona. It borders Austria.

== Settlements ==
In addition to the municipal seat of Gornja Radgona, the municipality also includes the following settlements:

- Aženski Vrh
- Črešnjevci
- Gornji Ivanjci
- Hercegovščak
- Ivanjski Vrh
- Ivanjševci ob Ščavnici
- Ivanjševski Vrh
- Kunova
- Lastomerci
- Lokavci
- Lomanoše
- Mele
- Negova
- Norički Vrh
- Očeslavci
- Orehovci
- Orehovski Vrh
- Plitvički Vrh
- Podgrad
- Police
- Ptujska Cesta
- Radvenci
- Rodmošci
- Spodnja Ščavnica
- Spodnji Ivanjci
- Stavešinci
- Stavešinski Vrh
- Zagajski Vrh
- Zbigovci
