= Zagajski Vrh =

- Location in Slovenia
- Coordinates: 46°38′36.86″N 15°54′18.56″E
- Country: Slovenia
- Traditional region: Styria
- Statistical region: Mura
- Municipality: Gornja Radgona

Area
  - Total: 1.7 km^{2} (0.66 sq mi)
- Elevation: 277.4 m (910 ft)

Population (2020)
  - Total: 136
  - Density: 80/km^{2} (210/sq mi)

Zagajski Vrh (pronounced [zaˈɡaːi̯ski ˈʋəɾx]) is a settlement in the Municipality of Gornja Radgona in northeastern Slovenia.

There are three small chapel-shrines in the village, each bearing its own belfry and all dating to the early 20th century.
