= Spodnji Ivanjci =

- Location in Slovenia
- Coordinates: 46°35′36.78″N 15°58′52.29″E
- Country: Slovenia
- Traditional region: Styria
- Statistical region: Mura
- Municipality: Gornja Radgona

Area
  - Total: 3.16 km^{2} (1.22 sq mi)
- Elevation: 225.1 m (739 ft)

Population (2020)
  - Total: 138
  - Density: 43.7/km^{2} (113/sq mi)

Spodnji Ivanjci (pronounced [ˈspoːdnji iˈʋaːntsi], German: Unteriswanzen) is a village in the Ščavnica Valley in the Municipality of Gornja Radgona in northeastern Slovenia.

There is a small chapel-shrine with a belfry in the settlement. It was built in the early 20th century.
