= List of Slovenian psychiatrists and psychologists =

A list of notable psychiatrists and psychologists from Slovenia:

== Psychologists ==
=== G ===
- Christian Gostečnik

=== P ===
- Vid Pečjak

=== Š ===
- Marjan Šetinc

=== T ===
- Anton Trstenjak
