= Ivanjševci ob Ščavnici =

- Location in Slovenia
- Coordinates: 46°37′9.2″N 15°58′1.79″E
- Country: Slovenia
- Traditional region: Styria
- Statistical region: Mura
- Municipality: Gornja Radgona

Area
  - Total: 1.89 km^{2} (0.73 sq mi)
- Elevation: 216.3 m (710 ft)

Population (2020)
  - Total: 66
  - Density: 35/km^{2} (90/sq mi)

Ivanjševci ob Ščavnici (pronounced [iˈʋaːnʃɛu̯tsi ɔp ˈʃtʃaːu̯nitsi], in older sources Ivanjšovci, German: Eibersdorf) is a small village in the valley of the upper course of the Ščavnica River in the Municipality of Gornja Radgona in northeastern Slovenia.

== Name ==
The name of the settlement was changed from Ivanjševci to Ivanjševci ob Ščavnici in 1955.
