= School of Economics and Business, Ljubljana =

Coordinates: 46°04′28″N 14°31′01″E

School of Economics and Business, University of Ljubljana
- Ekonomska fakulteta Univerze v Ljubljani
- Type: Public
- Established: 1946
- Dean: Metka Tekavčič
- Students: 6,000
- Location: Ljubljana, Slovenia
- Affiliations: AACSB, EQUIS, AMBA
- Website: www.ef.uni-lj.si/ www.efnet.si/en

The School of Economics and Business (SEB LU) in Ljubljana is part of the University of Ljubljana and was founded in 1946. It was one of the first faculties in the country to establish new internationally comparable Bologna 3+2 programs in 2005. In 2006 it was awarded EQUIS accreditation. In 2010 the school received business accreditation from AACSB International. Six years later, the school also received AMBA accreditation. With the addition of the AMBA accreditation, the school became one of 77 business schools in the world to hold the Triple Crown accreditation.

== Full-time programs in English ==
School of Economics and Business offers various undergraduate and graduate programs in business and economics in Slovenian and English.

=== Undergraduate program ===
The school offers a degree in business and economics with two specializations:

- Marketing
- International business

=== Master's programs ===
- Master in International Business
- Master in Bank and Financial Management (Double degree)
- Master in Money and Finance (Double degree)
- Master in Economics (Double degree)
- Master in Business Informatics (Information Management) (Double degree)
- Master in Logistics/Supply Chain Management
- International Full Time Master Program in Business Administration (IMB)
- European Master in Tourism Management (Joint program)
- Master in Business Administration in Co-operation with the ICPE
- International Business Academy – Macedonia
- Public Sector and Environmental Economics (JMPSE) (Joint triple degree program)

=== Doctoral program ===
- Doctoral Program in Economics and Business

== Executive education ==
This program allows employed executives to refine their knowledge at the school.

=== Open courses ===
Open development programs target general needs and address issues facing organizations, as assessed from clients' needs and suggestions. Each program is headed by a program director and is run jointly with other schools.

The open course portfolio includes the following areas of specialization

- general management;
- conducting business in foreign languages;
- informatics and organization;
- leadership and personal development;
- finance;
- accounting and controlling;
- marketing; and
- special topics (e.g., EU Projects/Funds, Legal Issues).

=== Company specific programs ===
Programs are provided for individual organizations. An additional program, titled “Business Academy”, is designed as a management development tool for top executives, middle managers or aspiring young managers.

== Research ==
Researchers and activities are organised within the Research Centre at the School of Economics and Business and fifteen applied research institutes.

The School of Economics and Business’ researchers regularly participate at scientific and professional conferences, produce monographs and publish in international scientific and professional journals such as the Journal of Business Finance & Accounting, the Academy of Management Review and Interactive Learning Environments.
