= Police (Šumperk District) =

- Municipality
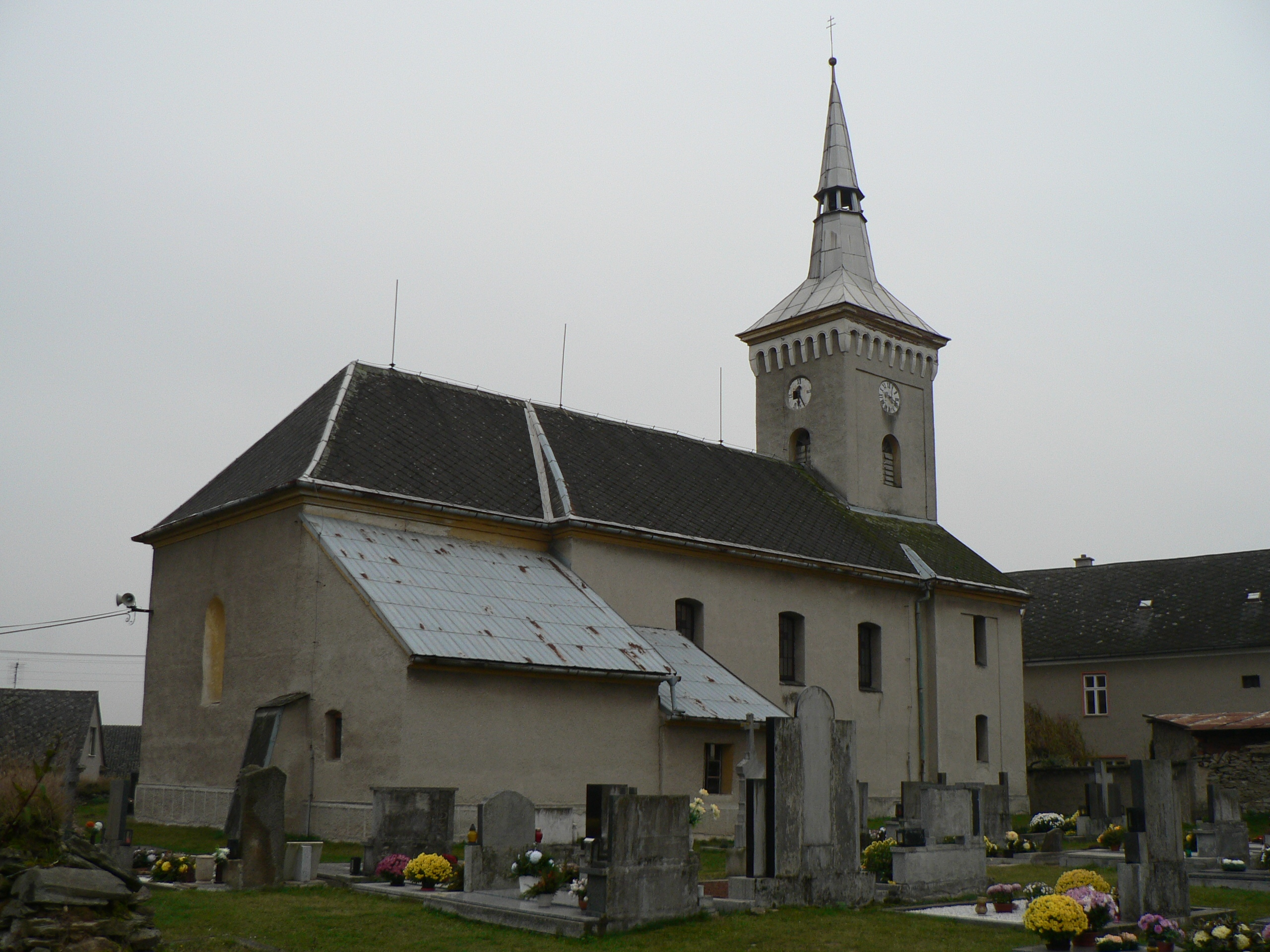
- Church of Saint Nicholas

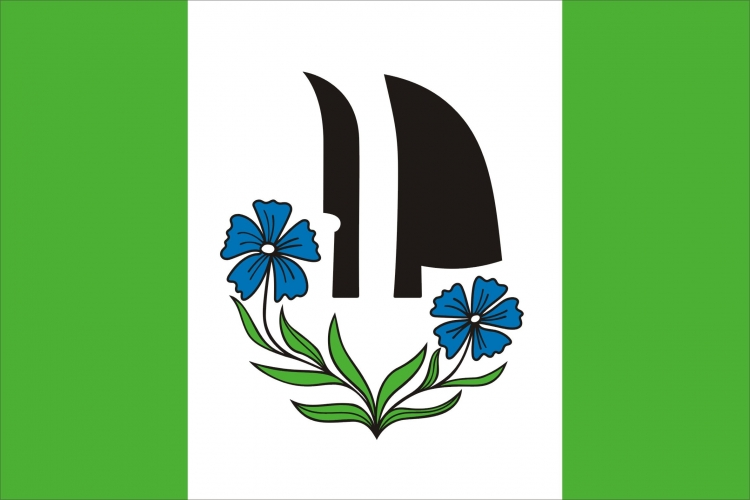
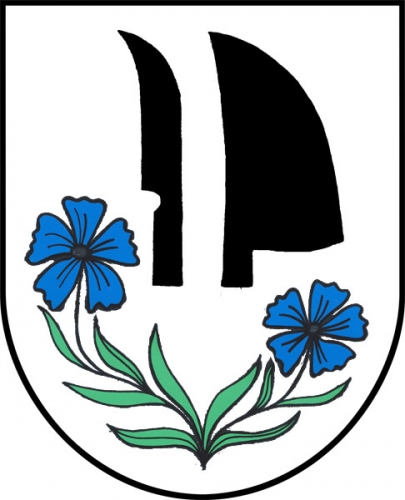
- Flag Coat of arms

- Location in the Czech Republic
- Coordinates: 49°48′53″N 16°59′47″E
- Country: Czech Republic
- Region: Olomouc
- District: Šumperk
- First mentioned: 1312

Area
  - Total: 5.63 km^{2} (2.17 sq mi)
- Elevation: 286 m (938 ft)

Population (2026-01-01)
  - Total: 244
  - Density: 43.3/km^{2} (112/sq mi)
- Time zone: UTC+1 (CET)
  - Summer (DST): UTC+2 (CEST)
- Postal codes: 789 73
- Website: www.police-mohelnicko.cz

Police (Czech pronunciation: [ˈpolɪtsɛ]; German: Pollaitz) is a municipality and village in Šumperk District in the Olomouc Region of the Czech Republic. It has about 200 inhabitants.

Police is approximately 16 kilometres (10 mi) south of Šumperk, 32 km (20 mi) north-west of Olomouc, and 187 km (116 mi) east of Prague.

== History ==
The first written mention of Police is from 1312.

== Demographics ==
Historical population
| Year | Pop. | ±% |
|---|---|---|
| 1869 | 427 | — |
| 1880 | 461 | +8.0% |
| 1890 | 464 | +0.7% |
| 1900 | 447 | −3.7% |
| 1910 | 468 | +4.7% |
| 1921 | 520 | +11.1% |
| 1930 | 455 | −12.5% |
| 1950 | 282 | −38.0% |
| 1961 | 255 | −9.6% |
| 1970 | 264 | +3.5% |
| 1980 | 263 | −0.4% |
| 1991 | 257 | −2.3% |
| 2001 | 245 | −4.7% |
| 2011 | 214 | −12.7% |
| 2021 | 205 | −4.2% |
Source: Censuses
