= Gornja Radgona Castle =

- Grad Gornja Radgona
- Gornja Radgona, Slovenia
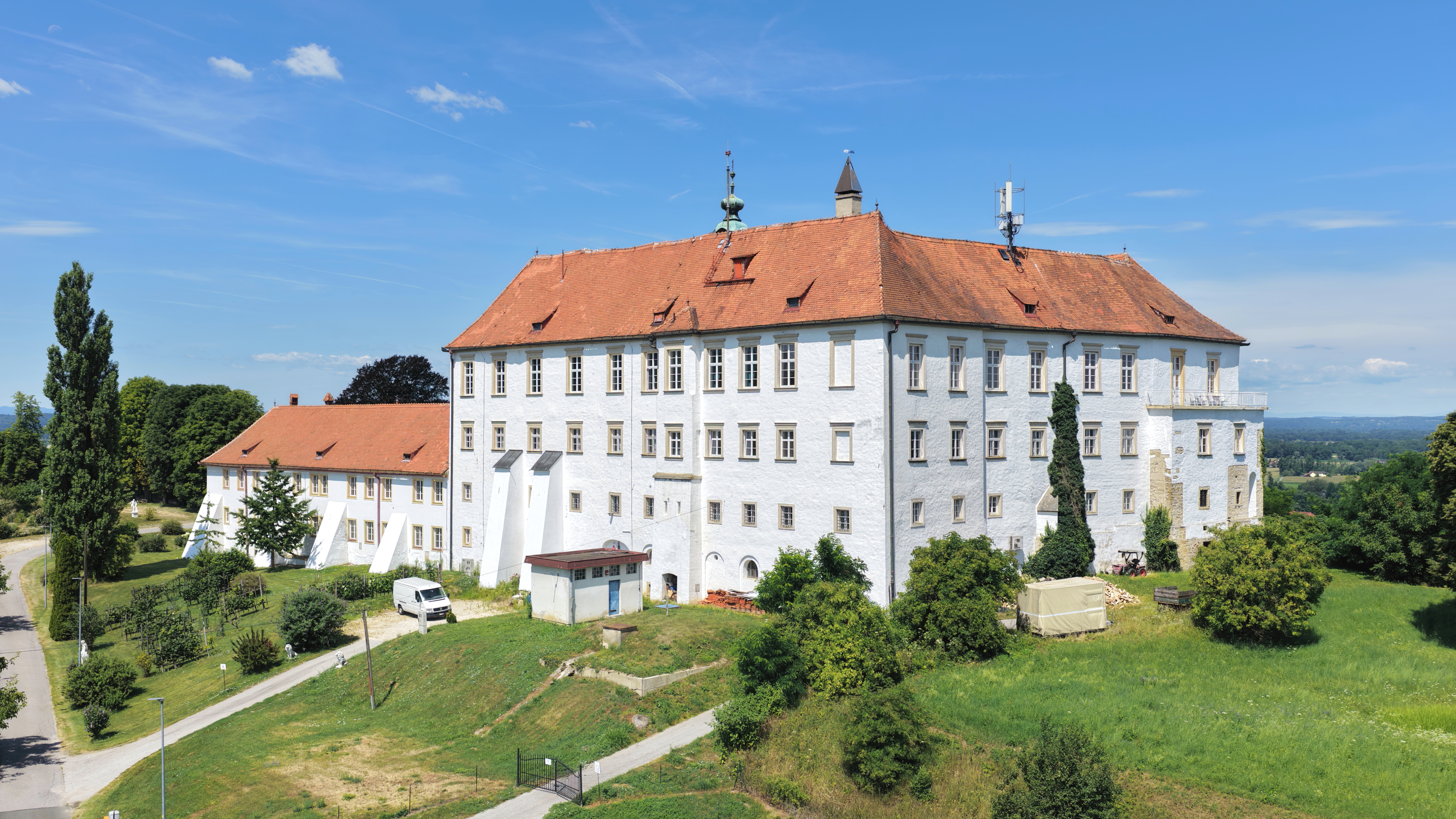
- Gornja Radgona Castle

Location
- Location in Slovenia
- Coordinates: 46.675°N 15.9925°E

Gornja Radgona Castle (Slovene: Grad Gornja Radgona, German: Schloss Oberradkersburg; sometimes also Ratigoj Castle) is a castle in Gornja Radgona, Slovenia.

== History ==
The castle was built sometime between 1147 and 1182, and served as an important fortress on the border of Styria with Hungary. The town of Gornja Radgona grew up at the base of the hill upon which the castle is built. The castle is mentioned in 1265 as having 40 subservient villages with 355 farms.

In the late 15th century it was the property of one Hans von Stubenberg (d. 1462), who joined Andreas Baumkircher, Freiherr von Schlaining (1420-1471) in a rebellion against Emperor Frederick III. When the rebellion failed, the emperor seized the castle. In 1479 it was occupied by troops loyal to Matthias Corvinus who kept control of the castle until Corvinus' death in 1490. Subsequently it was owned by the emperor but leased to different castellans for a long time. In the late 16th century, it underwent a thorough reconstruction.

In 1623 Emperor Ferdinand II sold the castle to Hans Ulrich von Eggenberg. It remained within the Eggenberg family until 1717, when it befell Leopold, count of Herberstein (1712-1789) through marriage. In 1789, he sold it to the House of Wurmbrand-Stuppach and it then stayed in the same family until 1914. In 1931, Slovenian authorities took over the castle itself; it has since served a number of purposes. It was damaged in 1945 during World War II but later repaired. It is today rented out and used as a private residence.
