= Politzer =

Politzer is a surname deriving from Politz. Notable people with the surname include:

- Adam Politzer, Hungarian physician
  - Politzerization, a treatment technique for ear infections, developed by him
- Georges Politzer, French philosopher
- H. David Politzer, American physicist
- Heinz Politzer, Austrian writer
- Rózsa Péter (1905–1977), born Rózsa Politzer, a Hungarian mathematician

== See also ==
- Pollitzer
- Pulitzer (disambiguation)
- Pölitz, Pomerania
