= Lomanoše =

- Location in Slovenia
- Coordinates: 46°40′12.12″N 15°56′53.07″E
- Country: Slovenia
- Traditional region: Styria
- Statistical region: Mura
- Municipality: Gornja Radgona

Area
  - Total: 2.59 km^{2} (1.00 sq mi)
- Elevation: 231.9 m (761 ft)

Population (2024)
  - Total: 239
  - Density: 92.3/km^{2} (239/sq mi)

Lomanoše (pronounced [lɔˈmaːnɔʃɛ], in older sources Lumanoše, German: Deutsch Radersdorf) is a village in the Municipality of Gornja Radgona in northeastern Slovenia.
