= Pulitzer (surname) =

Pulitzer is a surname. Notable people with the surname include:

- Henry F. Pulitzer (1899–1979), Austrian-born English art dealer
- J. Hutton Pulitzer, entrepreneur
- Joseph Pulitzer (1847–1911), American newspaper publisher and journalist
- Joseph Pulitzer Jr. (1913–1993), American newspaper publisher, grandson of Joseph
- Lilly Pulitzer (1931–2013), American socialite and fashion designer
- Lisa Pulitzer (born c. 1962), author and journalist
- Patsy Pulitzer (1928–2011), American model and socialite, granddaughter of Joseph
- Ralph Pulitzer (1879–1939), son of Joseph
- Roxanne Pulitzer (born 1951), American socialite, actress, novelist
