= Policy (disambiguation) =

A policy is a principle or rule that guides decisions in order to achieve a rational outcome.

Policy may also refer to:

== Principle or rule ==
- Domestic policy
- Economic policy
- Education policy
- Energy policy
- Environmental policy
- Foreign policy
- Health policy
- Human resource policies
- Information policy
- Immigration policy
- Macroeconomic policy
- Military policy
- Monetary policy
- Privacy policy
- Public policy, government action
- Public policy doctrine
- Science policy
- Security policy
  - Computer security policy
- Social policy
- Urban planning, urban policy

== Music ==
- Policy (Martha Davis album), 1987 album by Martha Davis
- Policy (Will Butler album), 2015 debut solo album by Arcade Fire member Will Butler

== Other uses ==
- Insurance policy, a contract between the insurer and the insured which determines the claims which the insurer is legally required to pay
- Policy game or policy racket, a form of illegal gambling or illegal lottery
- A reinforcement learning policy

== See also ==
- Guideline (disambiguation)
- Separation of mechanism and policy, a design principle in computer science
