= Anita Pollitzer =

American photographer and suffragist

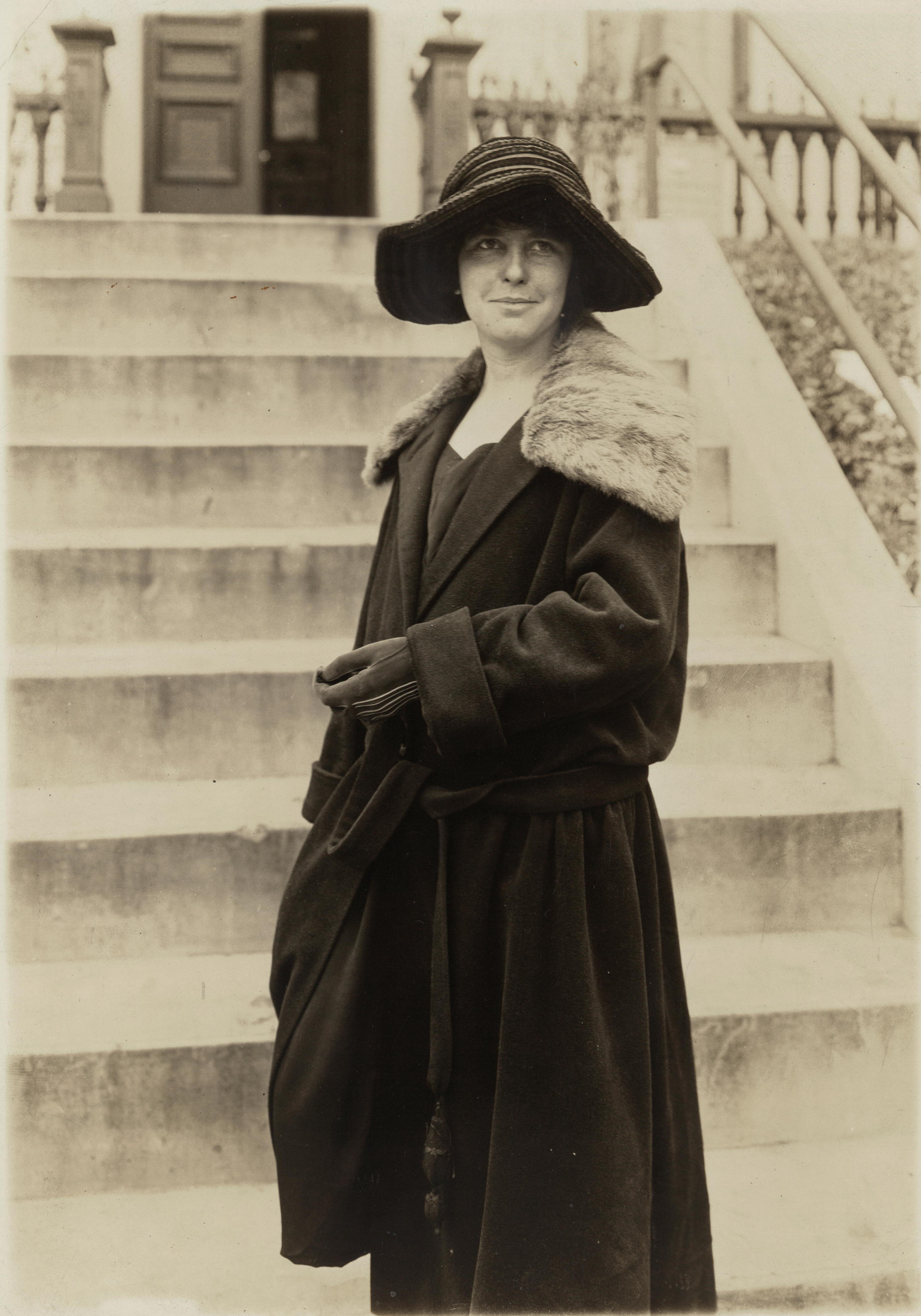
- Born: October 31, 1894; Charleston, South Carolina
- Died: July 3, 1975 (aged 80); New York City
- Known for: Photography
- Spouse: Elie Charlier Edson (m. 1928)

Anita Lily Pollitzer (October 31, 1894 – July 3, 1975) was an American photographer and suffragist.

== Early life and education ==
Anita Lily Pollitzer was born October 31, 1894, in Charleston, South Carolina. Her parents were Clara Guinzburg Pollitzer, the daughter of an immigrant rabbi from Prague, and Gustave Pollitzer, who ran a cotton company at Charleston, South Carolina. She had two sisters, Carrie (b. December 1881) and Mabel (b. January 1885) and a brother, Richard (b. October 1883).

Anita was raised Jewish and, as a young woman, taught Sabbath school in Charleston at Kahal Kadosh Beth Elohim. She was later a "nonobservant" Jew and relied upon her own personal strength, rather than reliance on religion. In response to her sister Mabel, who said in prayer, "God gave me mountains to climb and the strength to climb them," Anita's response was, "I don’t want God to give me mountains to climb…I want to find my own."

Anita graduated from Memminger High School in 1913 and left Charleston to study art at Teachers College, Columbia University.

== Career ==
=== Artist ===
Pollitzer "gained recognition for her close friendship with Georgia O'Keeffe", whom she met at Columbia University. They lived together for several years, and corresponded with each other. O'Keeffe mailed a set of charcoal drawings she made in 1915 to Pollitzer, who took them to Alfred Stieglitz at his 291 gallery early in 1916. Stieglitz found them to be the "purest, finest, sincerest things that had entered 291 in a long while", and in April, Stieglitz exhibited ten of her drawings at 291. This was the beginning of one of the most significant relationships among artists in the 20th century; Stieglitz promoted her career and later married O'Keeffe.

Pollitzer wrote a book entitled A Woman on Paper: Georgia O'Keeffe that contained letters that she exchanged with O'Keeffe since they attended Columbia University. The memoir not only contains her affection and love for O'Keeffe, but also anecdotes, family stories, and excerpts from their early letters. The early letters shared between the two mentioned questions of art and life and questions about the future. They remained friends until Pollitzer's death. Lynne Bundesen, who wrote a review of the book for The New York Times, said "it is a book that tells you that the voices of the most independent, far-seeing women of the times, the pioneers of women's rights and visions talked to each other as gushing, enthusiastic, eager and confused schoolgirls straight out of the Victorian era—as they may not have talked with their men." The book was published in 1988.

=== Suffragist ===
In January 1919, Anita went to Florida in an attempt to persuade state legislators to urge the U.S. Senators to support the Susan B. Anthony Amendment, this was a tactic used by the NWP to try to get federal action. She also attempted to gain media support by attending the South Florida Press Association meeting where she impressed editors so the Association passed a resolution favoring women's suffrage.

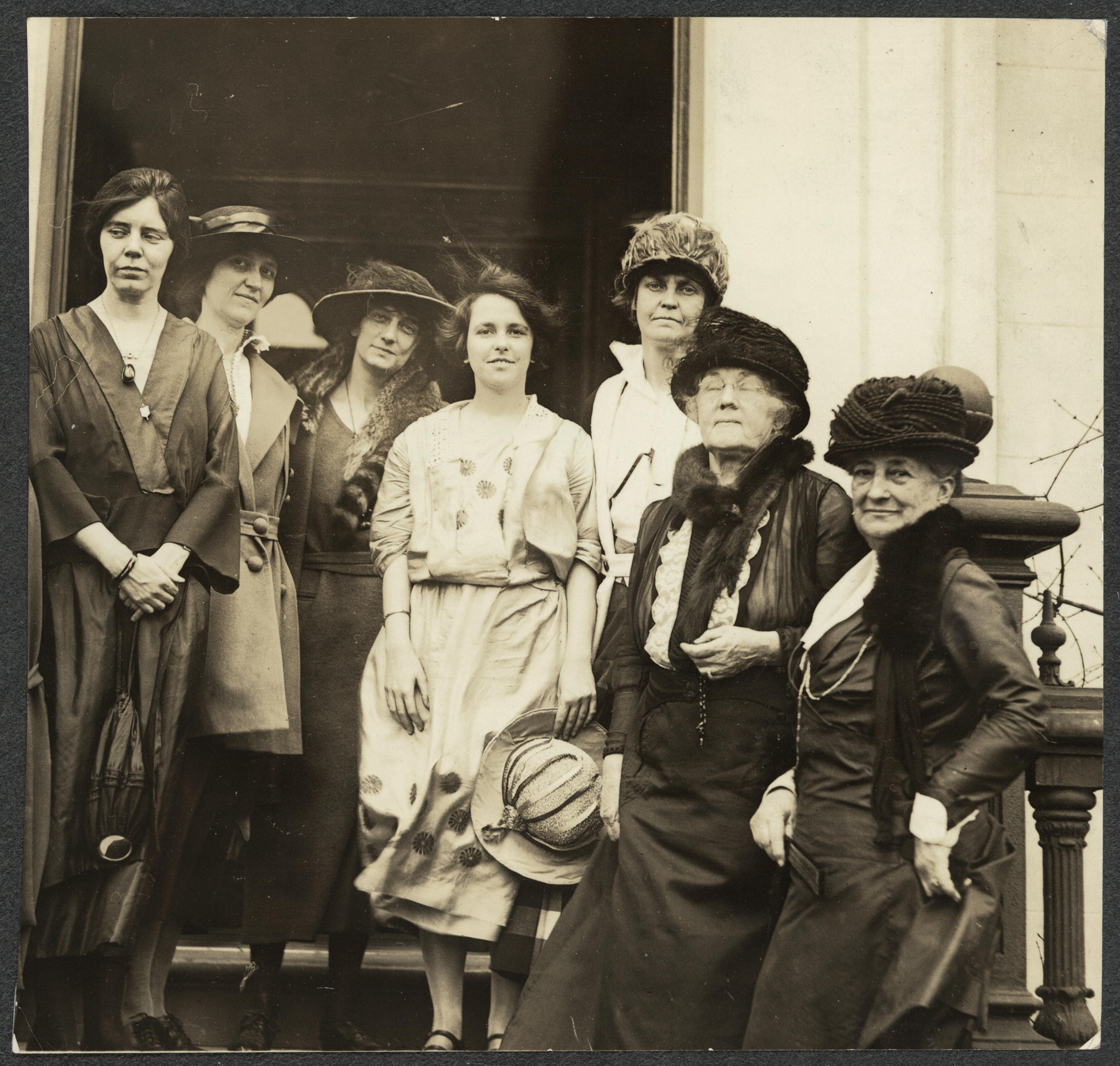
Photograph of (left to right) Alice Paul, Sue White, Florence Boeckel, Anita Pollitzer (center, holding hat), Mary Winsor, Sophie Meredith, and Mrs. Richard Wainwright of the National Woman's Party standing on front steps in front of new national headquarters building, across from the U.S. capitol in May 1922

Pollitzer was instrumental in the passage of the 19th Amendment. After it was ratified, Anita worked to encourage the passage of the Equal Rights Amendment, which was first presented to Congress by Alice Paul in 1923.

In 1926, Anita represented South Carolina at the International Feminists Conference (also known as International Alliance of Women and International Woman Suffrage Alliance) in Paris.

Throughout her time as a suffragist, Anita Pollitzer was in contact with many prominent figures, including Amelia Earhart and Eleanor Roosevelt.

Anita Pollitzer held positions of leadership in the National Woman's Party serving as National Chairman from 1945 until 1949.

== Personal life ==
On December 29, 1928, she married Elie Charlier Edson, Pete Seeger's uncle. Pollitzer died on July 3, 1975, in New York City.

== In media ==
In 2021, PBS ran a special titled SC Suffragists: Clubwomen, The Pollitzer Sisters, and the Vote, which was in part about Anita.
