= Mabel Pollitzer =

American educator

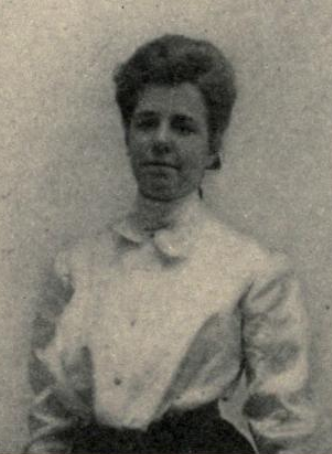
- Mabel Pollitzer, from the 1906 yearbook of Teachers College, Columbia University
- Born: Mabel Louise Pollitzer; January 11, 1885; Charleston, South Carolina
- Died: April 27, 1979 (aged 94)
- Occupations: Educator, suffragist
- Relatives: Anita Pollitzer (sister); William S. Pollitzer (nephew)

Mabel Louise Pollitzer (January 11, 1885 – April 27, 1979) was an American educator and suffragist from South Carolina. She was the South Carolina state chair of the National Woman's Party for almost forty years, and led the creation of the free public library system in Charleston County.

== Early life and education ==
Pollitzer was born in Charleston, South Carolina, the daughter of Gustave Moritz Pollitzer and Clara Guinzburg Pollitzer. Her younger sister was photographer and suffragist Anita Pollitzer; their father was a cotton broker. The Pollitzer family were members of Kahal Kadosh Beth Elohim in Charleston. She trained for teaching at Memminger Normal School, and earned a bachelor's degree from Teachers College, Columbia University in 1906.

== Career ==
Pollitzer taught science classes at Memminger High School for over forty years. She organized the Natural Science department, and designed the department's laboratories. She worked with students in the school's gardens. In 1920 she was elected president of the Charleston County Teachers' Association. She created an early sex education course, titled Child Development and Family Relations, for high school seniors.

Beyond the classroom, Pollitzer was involved in conservation and beautification efforts in South Carolina. She founded Charleston's annual Plant Exchange Day event in 1915, co-sponsored by the Charleston Civic Club. With her sisters Carrie and Anita, she was a charter member of the Charleston Equal Suffrage League, and later joined the National Woman's Party, for which she was South Carolina state chair. She led efforts to open a free public library system in Charleston County in the 1930s; it served both Black and white residents, though in separate facilities, under the racial segregation laws of the Jim Crow South.

She was inducted into the halls of fame maintained by the Charleston Federation of Women's Clubs and the National Council of Jewish Women. In 1973 and 1974, she gave interviews for the Oral Histories of the American South project.

== Personal life and legacy ==
Pollitzer died in 1979, at the age of 94. In 2006, a historical marker was placed at the Pollitzer sisters' home in Charleston, telling their stories. A documentary about the Pollitzer sisters, emphasizing their suffrage work, aired on PBS stations in 2021.
