= Gornja Radgona =

- Town
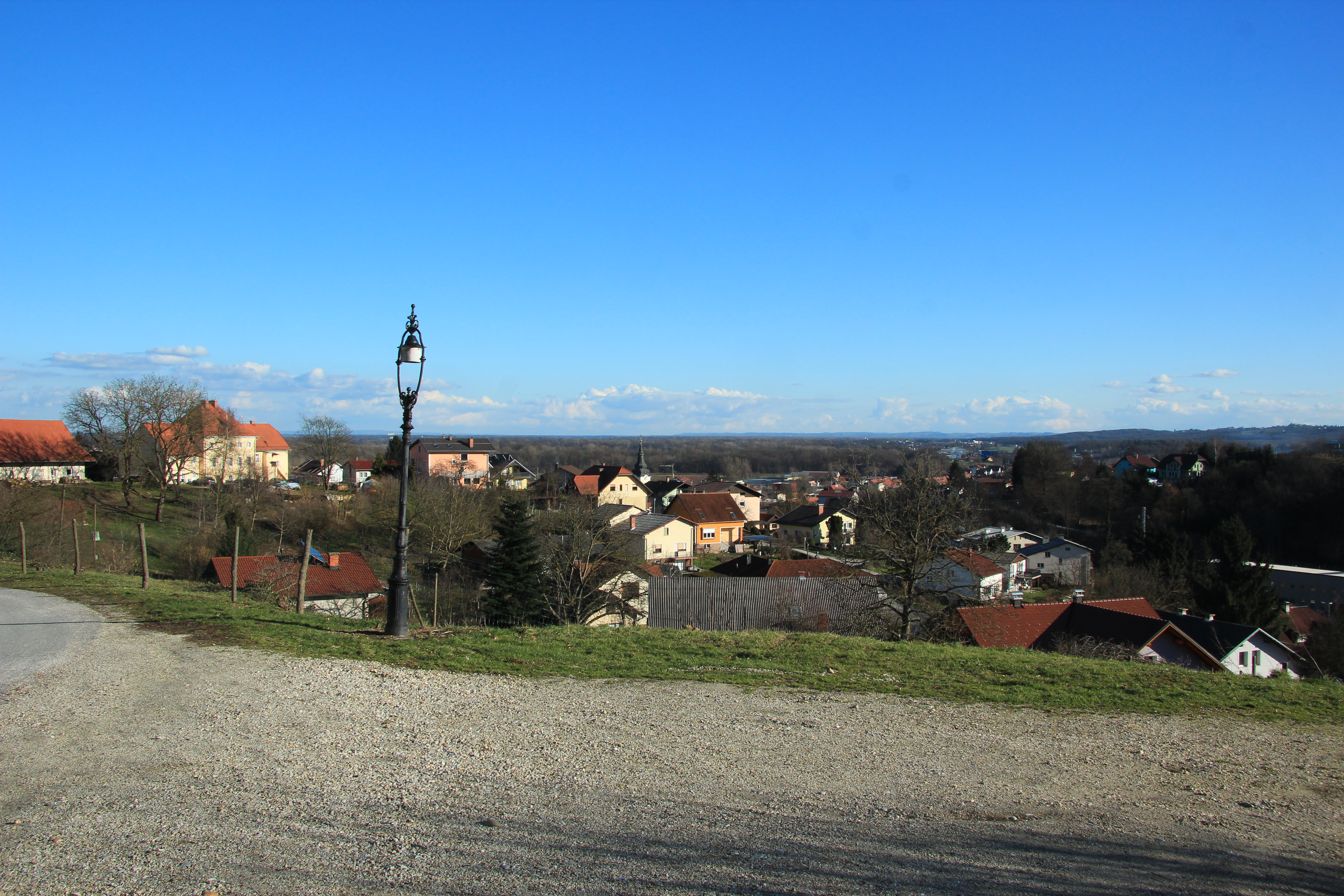
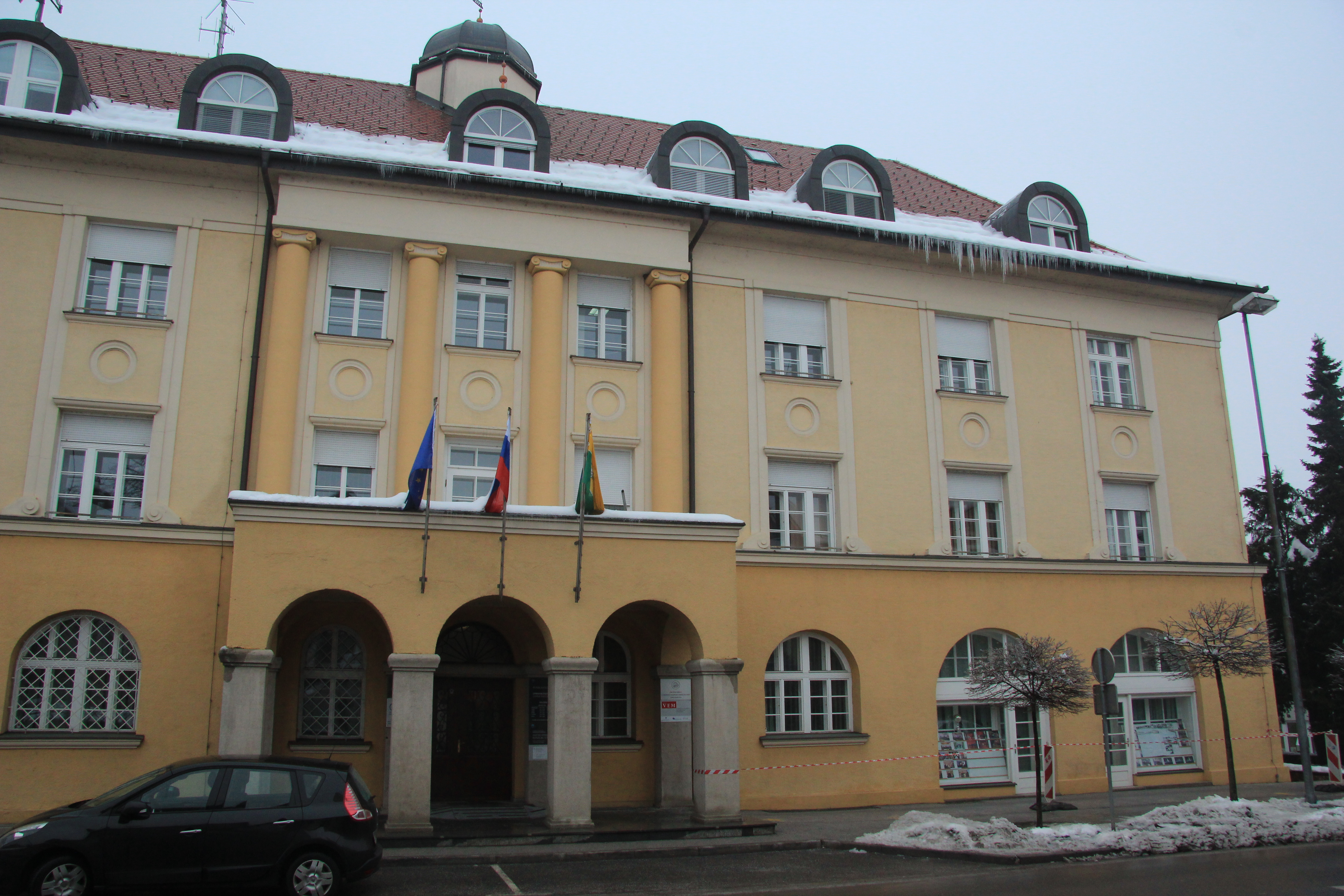
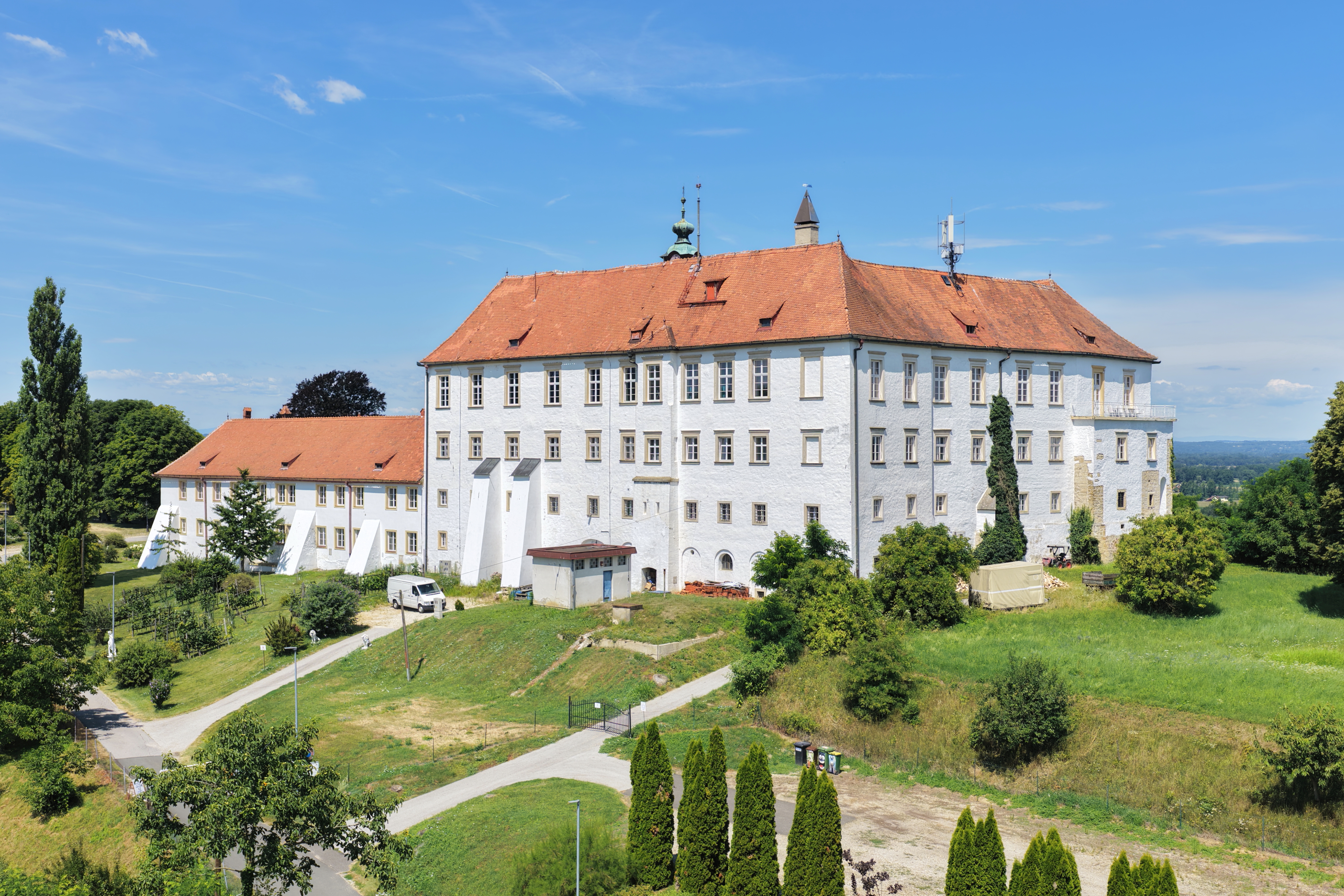
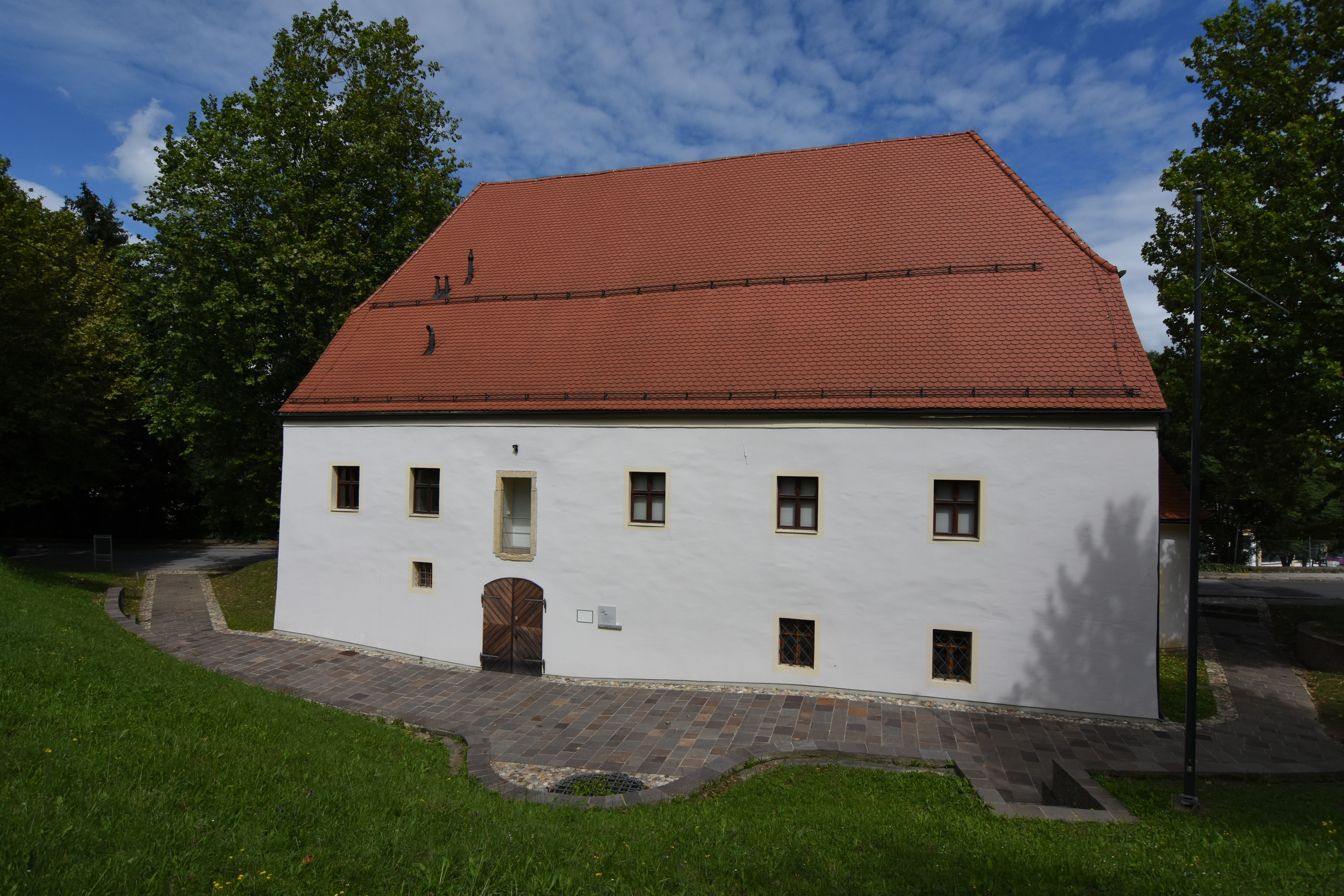
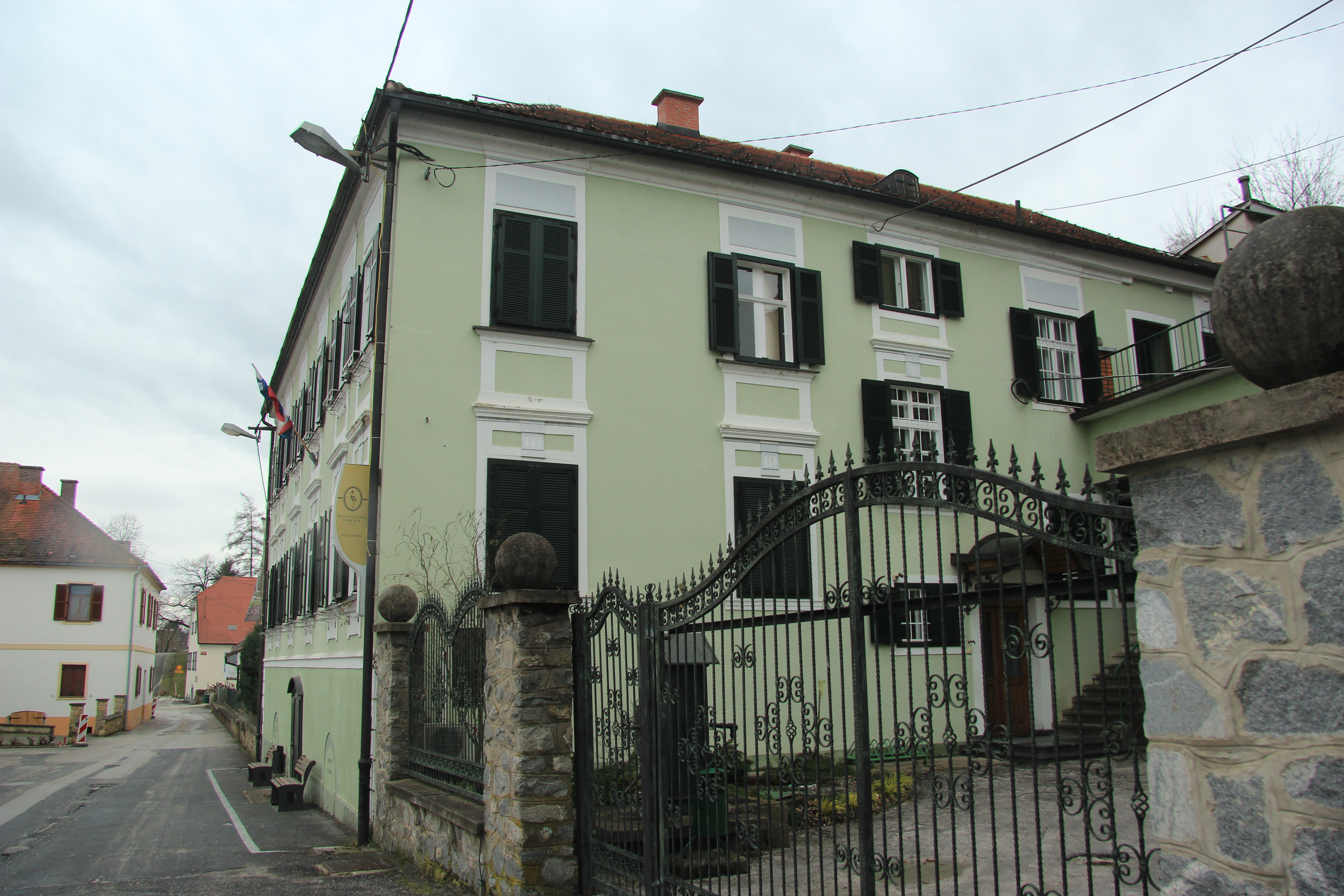
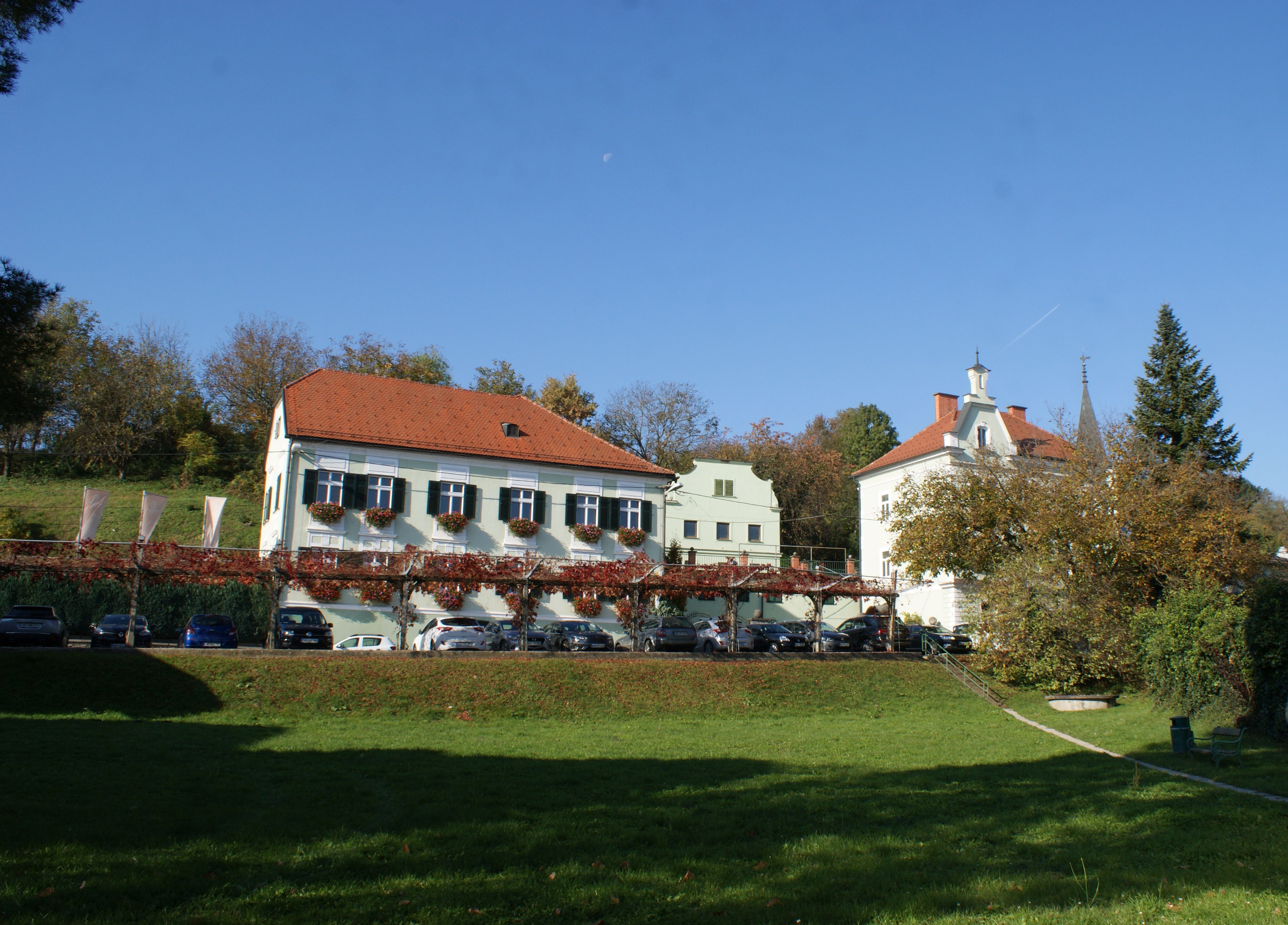
- From top, left to right: Overview of Gornja Radgona, Town Hall, Radgona Castle, Museum, Old manor, Palace complex

- Flag Coat of arms

- Location in Slovenia
- Coordinates: 46°40′30.84″N 15°59′33.38″E
- Country: Slovenia
- Traditional region: Styria
- Statistical region: Mura
- Municipality: Gornja Radgona

Area
  - Total: 3.0 km^{2} (1.2 sq mi)
- Elevation: 206 m (676 ft)

Population (2020)
  - Total: 3,086
- Vehicle registration: MS

Gornja Radgona (pronounced [ˈɡóːɾnja ˈɾáːdɡɔna]; German: Oberradkersburg, Hungarian: Felsőregede) is a town in Slovenia. It is the seat of the Municipality of Gornja Radgona. Once it was a defensive stronghold for today's regional centre and its twin city, Bad Radkersburg, on the other side of the Mura River in Austria. The towns were split in 1919, when the state of Styria was divided between Austria and Slovenia. They afterward developed separately, and Gornja Radgona grew into a new town centre.

== History ==
Traces of Neolithic settlement on Castle Hill attest to settlement during the Urnfield culture. Later finds indicate that there may have been a small Roman settlement here. The Parish of Gornja Radgona belonged to the Diocese of Salzburg and was founded under the Spanheims in the first half of the 12th century. The parish church in Gornja Radgona is dedicated to Saint Peter and was built in 1813 and extended in 1890.

The history of Gornja Radgona itself reaches back to the 12th century, when a settlement was established beneath Ratigoj Castle. King Albert I of Habsburg founded today's Radkersburg on an island in the Mura River, and it was mentioned as a market in 1265 and as a town in 1299. Eventually, the old settlement turned into a suburb of the town. Gornja Radgona was built on the slope of Castle Hill (265 m) and the tip of the Slovene Hills (Slovene: Slovenske gorice), which separate the Apače Basin from the Mura Basin.

Because of its important location on the Mura River, in the 12th and 13th centuries, Gornja Radgona and Radkersburg suffered multiple attacks by the Hungarians and, in the 15th and 16th centuries, attacks by the Ottoman Turks. In the early 18th century, peasant rebellions were a major problem.

In 1605 the Mura flooded, causing great damage to Gornja Radgona and Radkersberg, and nearly every generation experienced the plague. The worst outbreak was in 1680, and left many houses without occupants.

Gornja Radgona received market rights in 1907, and town status after World War II. Prior to 1918, it was administratively connected with Radkersburg. In February 1929, exceptionally cold weather caused ice to accumulate against the old wooden bridge between Gornja Radona and Radkersburg, destroying it. A new wooden bridge was not built until 1932. The favorable geographical location and economic contacts (including joint cooperation in preventing flood and fires, and important transport links) resulted in the joint construction of a new bridge. The bridge was ceremonially opened on 12 October 1968 by Yugoslav leader Josip Broz Tito and Austrian President Franz Jonas.

During the Ten-Day War for Slovenia's independence in 1991, major fighting occurred at the Gornja Radgona border crossing.

Historical population
Year	Pop.	±%
1948	1,239	—
1953	1,709	+37.9%
1961	1,759	+2.9%
1971	2,497	+42.0%
1981	3,345	+34.0%
1991	3,780	+13.0%
2002	3,259	−13.8%
2011	3,159	−3.1%
2021	3,103	−1.8%
Population size may be affected by changes in administrative divisions.

== Economy ==
Gornja Radgona is also known as a host of international fair events that are organized by Pomurski Sejem d.d. The best known is the International Agricultural and Food Fair, which is held every year and is attended by over 120,000 people. Gornja Radgona is known also for its wines.
