= Cvetkovci =

- Interactive map of Cvetkovci
- Location in Slovenia
- Coordinates: 46°24′43.74″N 16°3′49.6″E
- Country: Slovenia
- Traditional region: Styria
- Statistical region: Drava
- Municipality: Ormož

Area
  - Total: 5.62 km^{2} (2.17 sq mi)
- Elevation: 202.3 m (664 ft)

Population (2002)
  - Total: 469

Shrines in Cvetkovci

Cvetkovci (pronounced [tsʋɛˈtkoːu̯tsi], German: Zwetkofzen) is a village in the Municipality of Ormož northeastern Slovenia. The area is part of the traditional region of Styria and is now included in the Drava Statistical Region. The area is also known as Prlekija. The earliest mention of the village is in written documents dating to 1320, when it was called Maierhof.

Remains of a Roman settlement on the merchant road from Poetovio to Savaria were found in the southern part of the village during construction excavations monitored by archaeologists in 1995 and 1997. Cvetkovci lies on both sides of regional road from Ptuj to Ormož and borders on the villages of Osluševci, Podgorci, and Trgovišče. To the south is the border with Croatia. The Pesnica and Drava rivers flow eastwards just south of the settlement.

The village itself is divided into five hamlets: Zgornje Cvetkovci, Spodnje Cvetkovci, Trnje, Dobrava, and Otok.

The main activity in which the locals are involved is agriculture, with fields on northern side of the village and some agricultural land also to the south. Farmers are involved in cattle breeding and poultry farming. Recently vegetable growing and horse breeding have also become popular. Locals also work in nearby towns such as Ormož, Ptuj, and Maribor.
