= Gomila =

Gomila is a place name that may refer to:

- Gomila, Destrnik, a settlement in the Municipality of Destrnik, northeastern Slovenia
- Gomila, Mirna, a settlement in the Municipality of Mirna, central Slovenia
- Gomila pri Kogu, a settlement in the Municipality of Ormož, northeastern Slovenia
- Gomila, a hamlet of Šmarčna, a settlement in the Municipality of Sevnica, central Slovenia
