= Vitan =

Vitan may refer to:

- Vitan, a neighborhood in southeastern Bucharest, Romania
- Vitan, a settlement in the Ormož Municipality in northeastern Slovenia.
