= Runeč =

- Location in Slovenia
- Coordinates: 46°26′59.88″N 16°2′28.85″E
- Country: Slovenia
- Traditional region: Styria
- Statistical region: Drava
- Municipality: Ormož

Area
  - Total: 0.75 km^{2} (0.29 sq mi)
- Elevation: 266.8 m (875 ft)

Population (2002)
  - Total: 54

Runeč (pronounced [ˈɾuːnətʃ]) is a settlement in the hills north of Ormož in northeastern Slovenia. The area belongs to the traditional region of Styria. It is now included in the Drava Statistical Region.

The local church is dedicated to the Holy Family and belongs to the Parish of Velika Nedelja.
