= Lačaves =

- Location in Slovenia
- Coordinates: 46°27′10.15″N 16°15′0.72″E
- Country: Slovenia
- Traditional region: Styria
- Statistical region: Drava
- Municipality: Ormož

Area
  - Total: 1.5 km^{2} (0.58 sq mi)
- Elevation: 304.6 m (999 ft)

Population (2002)
  - Total: 134

Lačaves (pronounced [ˈlaːtʃaʋɛs]) is a settlement in the hills northeast of Ormož in northeastern Slovenia. It lies next to the village of Kog, close to the border with Croatia. The area belongs to the traditional region of Styria and is now included in the Drava Statistical Region.
