= Lunovec =

- Location in Slovenia
- Coordinates: 46°26′30.59″N 16°6′10.37″E
- Country: Slovenia
- Traditional region: Styria
- Statistical region: Drava
- Municipality: Ormož

Area
  - Total: 0.33 km^{2} (0.13 sq mi)
- Elevation: 316.7 m (1,039 ft)

Population (2002)
  - Total: 25

Lunovec (pronounced [ˈluːnɔʋəts]) is a small settlement in the hills north of Velika Nedelja in the Municipality of Ormož in northeastern Slovenia. The area belongs to the traditional region of Styria and is now included in the Drava Statistical Region.
