= Senešci =

- Location in Slovenia
- Coordinates: 46°25′33.09″N 16°5′20.97″E
- Country: Slovenia
- Traditional region: Styria
- Statistical region: Drava
- Municipality: Ormož

Area
  - Total: 2.17 km^{2} (0.84 sq mi)
- Elevation: 204.7 m (672 ft)

Population (2002)
  - Total: 233

Senešci (pronounced [ˈseːnɛʃtsi]) is a settlement northwest of Velika Nedelja in the Municipality of Ormož in northeastern Slovenia. The area belongs to the traditional region of Styria. It is now included in the Drava Statistical Region.

There is a small roadside chapel with a belfry and an open porch in the settlement. It was built in 1904.
