= Zasavci =

- Location in Slovenia
- Coordinates: 46°27′10.66″N 16°13′43.41″E
- Country: Slovenia
- Traditional region: Styria
- Statistical region: Drava
- Municipality: Ormož

Area
  - Total: 0.87 km^{2} (0.34 sq mi)
- Elevation: 293.7 m (964 ft)

Population (2002)
  - Total: 56

Zasavci (pronounced [ˈzaːsau̯tsi]) is a settlement in the Municipality of Ormož in northeastern Slovenia. It lies in the hills above Miklavž pri Ormožu. The area belongs to the traditional region of Styria. It is now included in the Drava Statistical Region.
