= Dobrovščak =

- Location in Slovenia
- Coordinates: 46°26′52.85″N 16°7′59.07″E
- Country: Slovenia
- Traditional region: Styria
- Statistical region: Drava
- Municipality: Ormož

Area
  - Total: 0.69 km^{2} (0.27 sq mi)
- Elevation: 273.6 m (898 ft)

Population (2002)
  - Total: 12

Dobrovščak (pronounced [ˈdoːbɾɔu̯ʃtʃak]) is a small settlement in the Slovene Hills north of the town of Ormož in northeastern Slovenia. The area belongs to the traditional region of Styria and is now included in the Drava Statistical Region.
