= Svetinje =

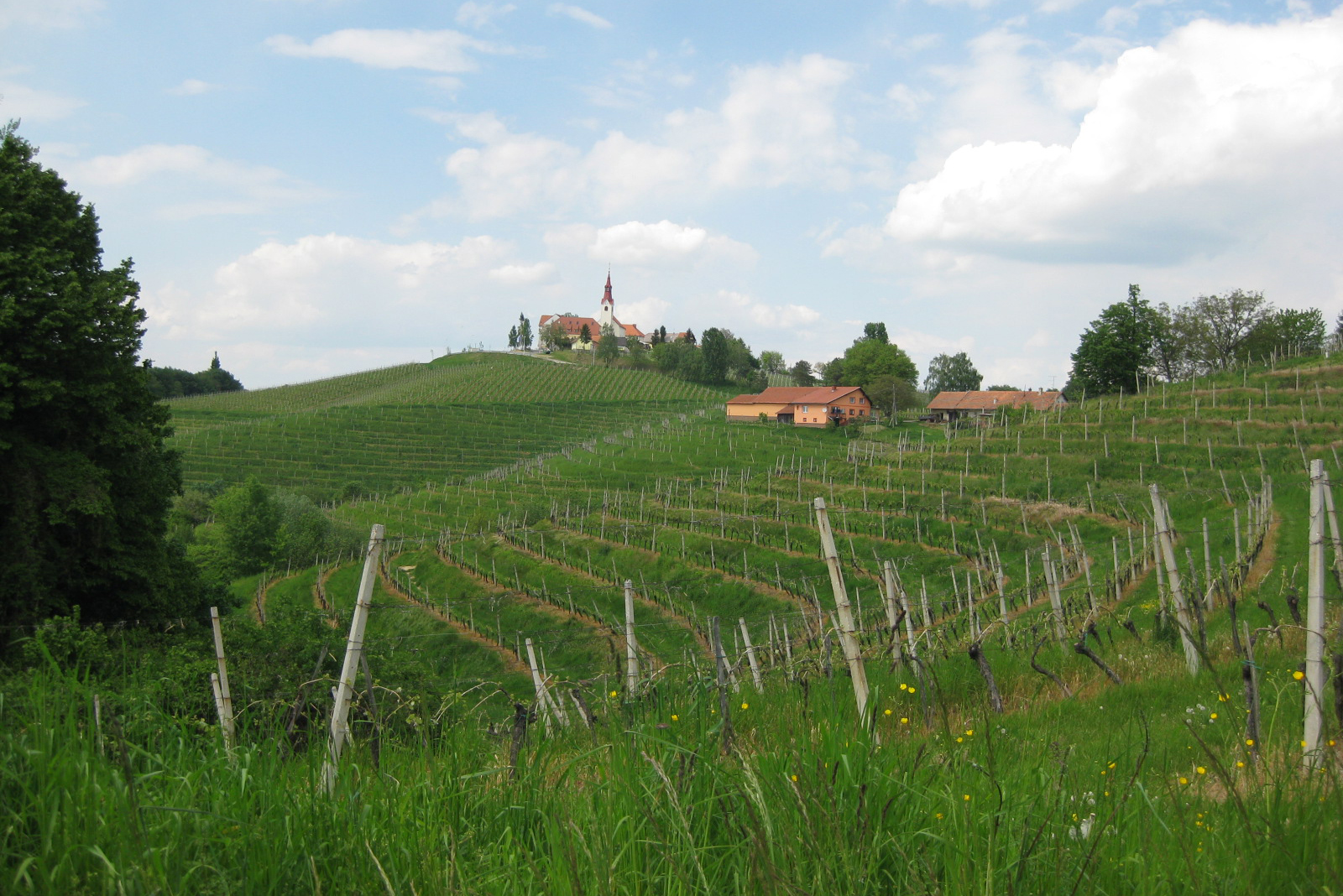

- Location in Slovenia
- Coordinates: 46°27′44″N 16°10′12″E
- Country: Slovenia
- Traditional region: Styria
- Statistical region: Drava
- Municipality: Ormož

Area
  - Total: 0.6 km^{2} (0.23 sq mi)

Population (2014)
  - Total: 52
  - Density: 88/km^{2} (230/sq mi)

Svetinje (pronounced [ˈsʋeːtinjɛ]) is a small village in the Municipality of Ormož in northeastern Slovenia. It lies on a small rise in the Slovene Hills east of the railway from Ormož to Hodoš and the village of Ivanjkovci, northeast of the village of Mihalovci. The village is part of the traditional region of Styria and is included in the Drava Statistical Region.

== History ==
Svetinje was established as a village in 2005 by ceding from Mihalovci. Its territory was expanded in 2006, when part of Veličane was reassigned to Svetinje.

== Church ==
A simple Baroque church, dedicated to All Saints, stands in the center of Svetinje. It is the parish church of the Parish of Svetinje, part of the Archdiocese of Maribor. It was completed in 1730.

== Notable people ==
Notable people that were born or lived in Svetinje include the following:

- Vladimir Vauhnik (1896–1955), Yugoslav military officer
