= Strmec pri Ormožu =

- Location in Slovenia
- Coordinates: 46°25′51.82″N 16°7′40″E
- Country: Slovenia
- Traditional region: Styria
- Statistical region: Drava
- Municipality: Ormož

Area
  - Total: 0.76 km^{2} (0.29 sq mi)
- Elevation: 283.7 m (931 ft)

Population (2002)
  - Total: 53

Strmec pri Ormožu (pronounced [ˈstəɾməts pɾi ˈoːɾmɔʒu]) is a small settlement in the hills immediately northwest of Ormož in northeastern Slovenia. The area belongs to the traditional region of Styria. It is now included in the Drava Statistical Region.
