= Lešniški Vrh =

- Location in Slovenia
- Coordinates: 46°26′14.19″N 16°8′42.3″E
- Country: Slovenia
- Traditional region: Styria
- Statistical region: Drava
- Municipality: Ormož

Area
  - Total: 0.51 km^{2} (0.20 sq mi)
- Elevation: 297.3 m (975 ft)

Population (2002)
  - Total: 52

Lešniški Vrh (pronounced [ˈleːʃniʃki ˈʋəɾx]) is a small settlement in the hills east of Lešnica in the Municipality of Ormož in northeastern Slovenia. The area belongs to the traditional region of Styria and is now included in the Drava Statistical Region.
