= Šardinje =

- Location in Slovenia
- Coordinates: 46°26′9.4″N 16°6′28.26″E
- Country: Slovenia
- Traditional region: Styria
- Statistical region: Drava
- Municipality: Ormož

Area
  - Total: 1.68 km^{2} (0.65 sq mi)
- Elevation: 302.1 m (991 ft)

Population (2002)
  - Total: 125

Šardinje (pronounced [ˈʃaːɾdinjɛ]) is a small settlement in the vineyard-covered hills northwest of Ormož in northeastern Slovenia. The area belongs to the traditional region of Styria. It is now included in the Drava Statistical Region.
