= Pušenci =

- Location in Slovenia
- Coordinates: 46°24′12.47″N 16°10′43.36″E
- Country: Slovenia
- Traditional region: Styria
- Statistical region: Drava
- Municipality: Ormož

Area
  - Total: 3.12 km^{2} (1.20 sq mi)
- Elevation: 193.8 m (636 ft)

Population (2002)
  - Total: 275

Pušenci (pronounced [ˈpuːʃɛntsi]) is a settlement east of Ormož in northeastern Slovenia. The area belonged to the traditional region of Styria. It is now included in the Drava Statistical Region.

There is a small chapel with a belfry in the settlement. It was built in the early 20th century on the site of an older chapel.
