= Mali Brebrovnik =

- Location in Slovenia
- Coordinates: 46°27′35.39″N 16°10′58.99″E
- Country: Slovenia
- Traditional region: Styria
- Statistical region: Drava
- Municipality: Ormož

Area
  - Total: 2.39 km^{2} (0.92 sq mi)
- Elevation: 302.8 m (993 ft)

Population (2002)
  - Total: 180

Mali Brebrovnik (pronounced [ˈmaːli bɾɛˈbɾou̯nik]) is a settlement in the hills north of Ormož in northeastern Slovenia. The area belongs to the traditional region of Styria and is now included in the Drava Statistical Region.
