= Krčevina, Ormož =

Krčevina
- Location in Slovenia
- Coordinates: 46°25′45.61″N 16°12′29.83″E
- Country: Slovenia
- Traditional region: Styria
- Statistical region: Drava
- Municipality: Ormož

Area
  - Total: 2.79 km^{2} (1.08 sq mi)
- Elevation: 234.9 m (771 ft)

Population (2002)
  - Total: 72

Krčevina (pronounced [ˈkəɾtʃɛʋina], in older sources Krčovina, German: Kertschovina) is a small settlement northeast of Ormož in northeastern Slovenia. The area belongs to the traditional region of Styria and is now included in the Drava Statistical Region.
