= Ritmerk =

- Location in Slovenia
- Coordinates: 46°26′59.88″N 16°2′28.85″E
- Country: Slovenia
- Traditional region: Styria
- Statistical region: Drava
- Municipality: Ormož

Area
  - Total: 0.75 km^{2} (0.29 sq mi)
- Elevation: 266.8 m (875 ft)

Population (2002)
  - Total: 54

Ritmerk (pronounced [ˈɾiːtmɛɾk], German: Ritenberg) is a small settlement north of Podgorci in the Municipality of Ormož in northeastern Slovenia. The area belonged to the traditional region of Styria. It is now included in the Drava Statistical Region.

There is a small chapel in the settlement. It dates to the late 19th to early 20th century.
