= Hardek =

- Location in Slovenia
- Coordinates: 46°25′5.6″N 16°9′39.41″E
- Country: Slovenia
- Traditional region: Styria
- Statistical region: Drava
- Municipality: Ormož

Area
  - Total: 1.09 km^{2} (0.42 sq mi)
- Elevation: 236.6 m (776 ft)

Population (2002)
  - Total: 240

Hardek (pronounced [xaɾˈdeːk], German: Hardegg) is a settlement that is an urban continuation of Ormož in northeastern Slovenia. The area belongs to the traditional Styria region and is now included in the Drava Statistical Region.

The outbuildings of Ormož Castle are located in the south of the settlement. The U-shaped building with an inner courtyard dates to the 18th century.
