= Jastroblje =

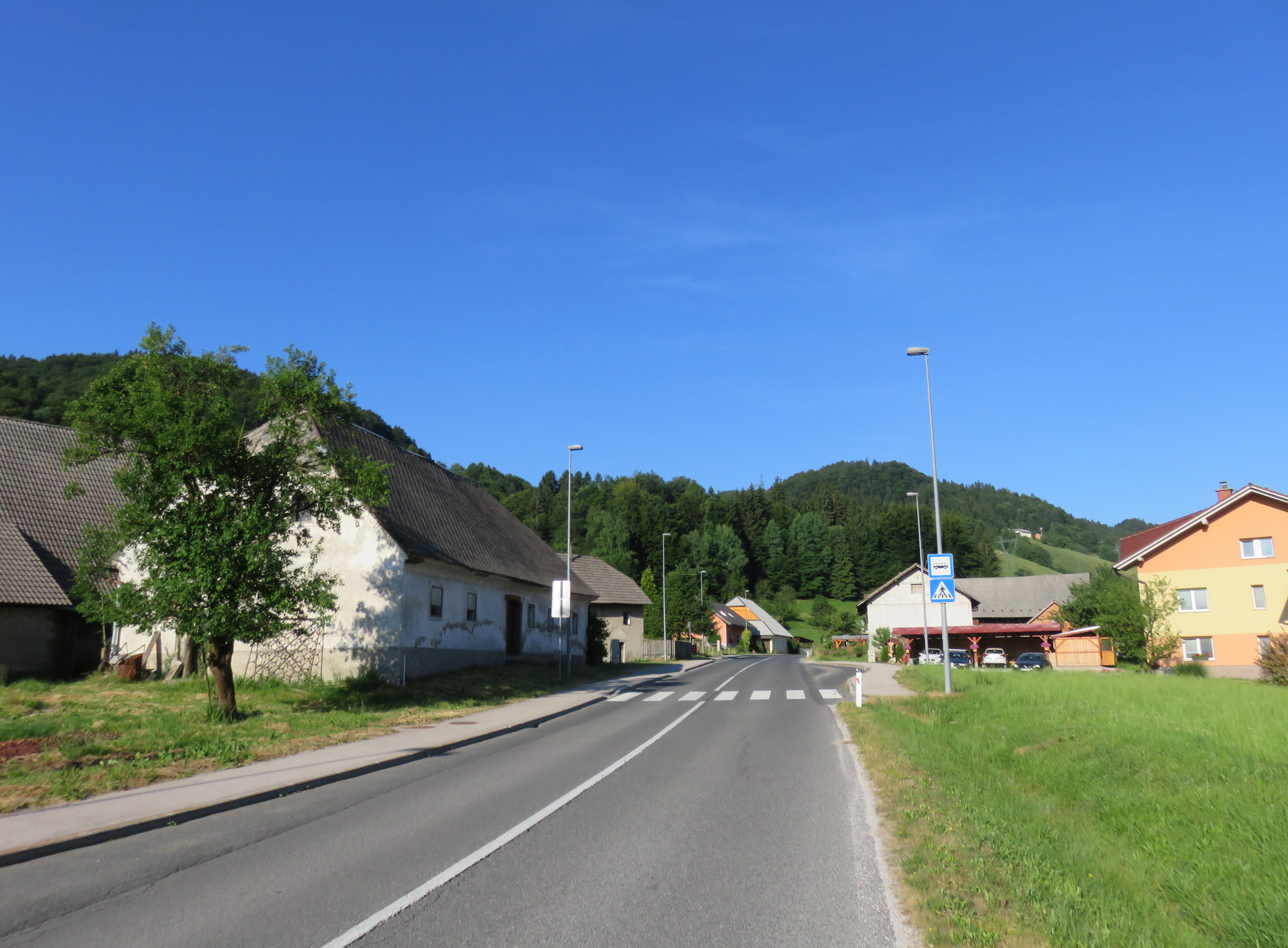

- Location in Slovenia
- Coordinates: 46°12′55″N 14°50′00″E
- Country: Slovenia
- Traditional region: Upper Carniola
- Statistical region: Central Slovenia
- Municipality: Kamnik
- Elevation: 525 m (1,722 ft)

Jastroblje (pronounced [ˈjaːstɾɔbljɛ], in older sources Jastroble) is a former settlement in the Municipality of Kamnik in central Slovenia. It is now part of the village of Špitalič. The area is part of the traditional region of Upper Carniola. The municipality is now included in the Central Slovenia Statistical Region.

== Geography ==
Jastroblje is a scattered village about 900 meters (3,000 ft) west of the center of Špitalič. Motnišnica Creek flows north of the settlement, and the road to the Lipovec Pasture above Špitalič turns off of the main road at Jastroblje.

== Name ==
Jastroblje was attested as Gasterdorff in 1488. The name Jastroblje is believed to derive from the common noun jastreb 'goshawk; vulture', referring to local fauna. It is related to similar toponyms such as Jastrebci and Jastrebnik.

== History ==
Jastroblje was annexed by Špitalič in 1953, ending its existence as an independent settlement.
