= Spodnji Ključarovci =

- Location in Slovenia
- Coordinates: 46°27′7.5″N 16°6′11.59″E
- Country: Slovenia
- Traditional region: Styria
- Statistical region: Drava
- Municipality: Ormož

Area
  - Total: 3.26 km^{2} (1.26 sq mi)
- Elevation: 219.5 m (720 ft)

Population (2008)
  - Total: 121

Spodnji Ključarovci (pronounced [ˈspoːdnji kljuˈtʃaːɾɔu̯tsi]) is a settlement in the Slovene Hills northwest of Ormož in northeastern Slovenia. The area traditionally belonged to the region of Styria. It is now included in the Drava Statistical Region.

There is a small roadside chapel with a belfry in the southern part of the settlement. It was built in the 1920s.
