= Kajžar =

- Location in Slovenia
- Coordinates: 46°27′31.9″N 16°13′26.08″E
- Country: Slovenia
- Traditional region: Styria
- Statistical region: Drava
- Municipality: Ormož

Area
  - Total: 0.86 km^{2} (0.33 sq mi)
- Elevation: 319.4 m (1,048 ft)

Population (2002)
  - Total: 164

Kajžar (pronounced [ˈkaːi̯ʒaɾ]) is a small settlement in the hills northeast of Ormož in northeastern Slovenia. The area belongs to the traditional region of Styria and is now included in the Drava Statistical Region.
