= Pavlovski Vrh =

- Location in Slovenia
- Coordinates: 46°26′41.51″N 16°10′39.08″E
- Country: Slovenia
- Traditional region: Styria
- Statistical region: Drava
- Municipality: Ormož

Area
  - Total: 1.55 km^{2} (0.60 sq mi)
- Elevation: 267.6 m (878 ft)

Population (2002)
  - Total: 153

Pavlovski Vrh (pronounced [ˈpaːu̯lɔu̯ski ˈʋəɾx]) is a settlement in the hills north of Pavlovci in the Municipality of Ormož in northeastern Slovenia. The area belongs to the traditional region of Styria and is now included in the Drava Statistical Region.
