= Lahonci =

- Location in Slovenia
- Coordinates: 46°28′57.3″N 16°6′44.76″E
- Country: Slovenia
- Traditional region: Styria
- Statistical region: Drava
- Municipality: Ormož

Area
  - Total: 4.05 km^{2} (1.56 sq mi)
- Elevation: 311.3 m (1,021 ft)

Population (2002)
  - Total: 355

Lahonci (pronounced [ˈlaːxɔntsi], German: Lachonetz) is a settlement in the hills north of Ormož in northeastern Slovenia. The area belongs to the traditional region of Styria and is now included in the Drava Statistical Region.

There is a small chapel with a belfry in the settlement. It was built in the early 20th century.
