= Hajndl =

- Location in Slovenia
- Coordinates: 46°25′6.24″N 16°7′30.63″E
- Country: Slovenia
- Traditional region: Styria
- Statistical region: Drava
- Municipality: Ormož

Area
  - Total: 0.75 km^{2} (0.29 sq mi)
- Elevation: 266.2 m (873 ft)

Population (2002)
  - Total: 116

Hajndl (pronounced [ˈxaːi̯ndəl]) is a small settlement immediately west of Ormož in northeastern Slovenia. The area belongs to the traditional region of Styria and is now included in the Drava Statistical Region.
