= Preclava =

- Location in Slovenia
- Coordinates: 46°25′53.61″N 16°2′14″E
- Country: Slovenia
- Traditional region: Styria
- Statistical region: Drava
- Municipality: Ormož

Area
  - Total: 0.25 km^{2} (0.097 sq mi)
- Elevation: 279.4 m (917 ft)

Population (2002)
  - Total: 41

Preclava (pronounced [ˈpɾeːtslaʋa] or [ˈpɾɛːtslaʋa], German: Prezlava) is a small settlement east of Podgorci in the Municipality of Ormož in northeastern Slovenia. The area belongs to the traditional region of Styria and is now included in the Drava Statistical Region.
