= Pavlovci =

Pavlovci may refer to:

- Pavlovci, Serbia, a settlement in the Srem District in Vojvodina, Serbia
- Pavlovci, Slovenia, a settlement in the Ormož municipality in Slovenia
- Pavlovci, Požega-Slavonia County, a village near Brestovac, Croatia
- Pavlovci, Brod-Posavina County, a village near Nova Kapela, Croatia
