= Vitan, Ormož =

Vitan
- Location in Slovenia
- Coordinates: 46°26′22.17″N 16°14′34.33″E
- Country: Slovenia
- Traditional region: Styria
- Statistical region: Drava
- Municipality: Ormož

Area
  - Total: 2.41 km^{2} (0.93 sq mi)
- Elevation: 242.5 m (796 ft)

Population (2002)
  - Total: 87

Vitan (pronounced [ˈʋiːtan]) is a settlement northeast of Ormož in northeastern Slovenia. It lies on the regional road from Središče ob Dravi to Miklavž pri Ormožu. The area belongs to the traditional region of Styria. It is now included in the Drava Statistical Region.
