= Frankovci =

Frankovci may refer to:

- Frankovci (political party), a Croatian party also known as Frankists
- Frankovci, Slovenia, a village near Ormož
