= Mihovci pri Veliki Nedelji =

- Location in Slovenia
- Coordinates: 46°24′26.81″N 16°6′42.66″E
- Country: Slovenia
- Traditional region: Styria
- Statistical region: Drava
- Municipality: Ormož

Area
  - Total: 4.98 km^{2} (1.92 sq mi)
- Elevation: 195.1 m (640 ft)

Population (2002)
  - Total: 563

Mihovci pri Veliki Nedelji (pronounced [ˈmiːxɔu̯tsi pɾi ˈʋeːliki ˈneːdɛlji]) is a settlement west of Ormož in northeastern Slovenia. To the south its territory extends to the banks of the Drava River and the border with Croatia. The area belongs to the traditional Styria region and is now included in the Drava Statistical Region.

== Name ==
The name of the settlement was changed from Mihovci to Mihovci pri Veliki Nedelji in 1953.

== Cultural heritage ==
The Roman road from Poetovio to Savaria ran through the settlement and a section of it survives as a regional road. Its profile was recorded by an archaeological field survey in 1963.
