= Veličane =

- Location in Slovenia
- Coordinates: 46°28′30.49″N 16°10′15.83″E
- Country: Slovenia
- Traditional region: Styria
- Statistical region: Drava
- Municipality: Ormož

Area
  - Total: 2.1 km^{2} (0.81 sq mi)

Population (2014)
  - Total: 117
  - Density: 55/km^{2} (140/sq mi)

Veličane (pronounced [ʋɛliˈtʃaːnɛ], German: Velitschan) is a dispersed settlement in the Slovene Hills north of Ormož, east of the Ormož–Hodoš Railway, in northeastern Slovenia. The area belongs to the traditional region of Styria. It is now included in the Drava Statistical Region. In 2006, part of the settlement's territory was transferred to the newly created settlement of Svetinje. In 2007, another part was transferred to the settlement of Trstenik.
