= Libanja =

- Location in Slovenia
- Coordinates: 46°26′27.87″N 16°10′43″E
- Country: Slovenia
- Traditional region: Styria
- Statistical region: Drava
- Municipality: Ormož

Area
  - Total: 2.06 km^{2} (0.80 sq mi)
- Elevation: 259 m (850 ft)

Population (2002)
  - Total: 84

Libanja (pronounced [liˈbaːnja]) is a settlement in the hills north of Ormož in northeastern Slovenia. The area belongs to the traditional Styria region and is now included in the Drava Statistical Region.

There is a small chapel with a belfry in the settlement. It was built in the early 20th century.

The railway line from Maribor to Murska Sobota runs through the settlement.
