= Lake Ormož =

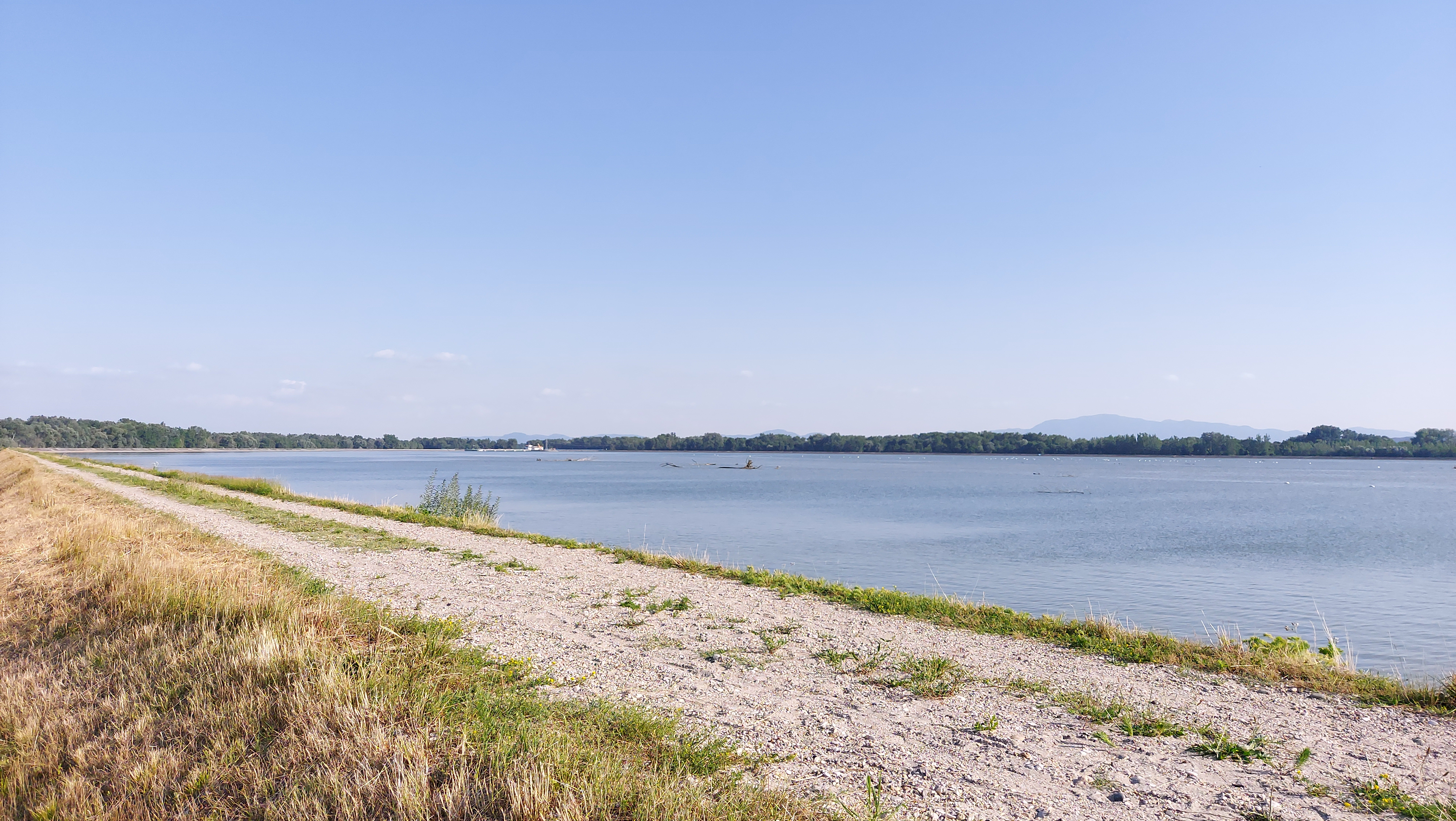
- Lake Ormož, as seen from the left bank

- Location within Slovenia Location within Croatia
- Interactive map of Lake Ormož
- Location: Municipality of Ormož, Slovenia; Varaždin County, Croatia
- Coordinates: 46°23′26″N 16°10′22″E
- Type: reservoir
- Primary inflows: Drava
- Primary outflows: Drava
- Surface area: 3 km^{2} (1.2 sq mi)
- Settlements: Ormož, Frankovci, Otok Virje, Vratno Otok

Lake Ormož (Slovene and Croatian: Ormoško jezero) is a reservoir on the Drava River in northeastern Slovenia and northwestern Croatia, forming a part of the border between the two countries. It was named after the nearby Slovenian town of Ormož on the left bank of the Drava River, just next to its northern end, and has an area of approximately 3 km^{2}.

The reservoir was constructed in 1975, when both Slovenia and Croatia were part of Yugoslavia, to serve the Varaždin Hydroelectric Power Plant. The dam and the power plant are on the Croatian side of the border and represent the southern end of Lake Ormož. The border follows the natural course of the Drava River as it appeared before the construction of the reservoir.

On the Slovenian side of the border, six retention basins were built near the left bank of Lake Ormož in 1980 to manage wastewater from a sugar refinery that operated in Ormož at the time. In 1992, the Municipality of Ormož protected the Slovenian part of Lake Ormož and the area along its left bank as a nature reserve due to its importance as a habitat for birds. After the sugar refinery ceased operations, the six retention basins became a marsh in a matter of years, eventually being protected as a nature reserve on a national level in 2017. As many as 261 different bird species were spotted around Lake Ormož, with the nature reserve also attracting some rare species of migratory birds.
