= Litmerk =

- Location in Slovenia
- Coordinates: 46°26′21.33″N 16°9′13.84″E
- Country: Slovenia
- Traditional region: Styria
- Statistical region: Drava
- Municipality: Ormož

Area
  - Total: 3.37 km^{2} (1.30 sq mi)
- Elevation: 296.6 m (973 ft)

Population (2002)
  - Total: 179

Litmerk (pronounced [ˈliːtmɛɾk]) is a settlement in the hills north of Ormož in northeastern Slovenia. The area belongs to the traditional region of Styria and is now included in the Drava Statistical Region.

There is a small chapel with a metal-covered spire in the settlement. It was built in 1879.
