= Strjanci =

- Location in Slovenia
- Coordinates: 46°26′28.4″N 16°3′10.88″E
- Country: Slovenia
- Traditional region: Styria
- Statistical region: Drava
- Municipality: Ormož

Area
  - Total: 1.46 km^{2} (0.56 sq mi)
- Elevation: 295.7 m (970 ft)

Population (2002)
  - Total: 84

Strjanci (pronounced [stəɾˈjaːntsi], in older sources Sterjanci, German: Sterianzen) is a small settlement in the Slovene Hills above Podgorci in the Municipality of Ormož in northeastern Slovenia. The area belongs to the traditional region of Styria. It is now included in the Drava Statistical Region.
