= Loperšice =

- Location in Slovenia
- Coordinates: 46°24′16.76″N 16°12′9.13″E
- Country: Slovenia
- Traditional region: Styria
- Statistical region: Drava
- Municipality: Ormož

Area
  - Total: 2.8 km^{2} (1.1 sq mi)
- Elevation: 205.2 m (673 ft)

Population (2002)
  - Total: 172

Loperšice (pronounced [ˈloːpɛɾʃitsɛ], German: Loperschitsch) is a village east of Ormož in northeastern Slovenia. The area belongs to the traditional region of Styria and is now included in the Drava Statistical Region.
