= Lešnica, Ormož =

Lešnica
- Location in Slovenia
- Coordinates: 46°26′14.33″N 16°7′56.39″E
- Country: Slovenia
- Traditional region: Styria
- Statistical region: Drava
- Municipality: Ormož

Area
  - Total: 4.8 km^{2} (1.9 sq mi)
- Elevation: 209.9 m (689 ft)

Population (2002)
  - Total: 206

Lešnica (pronounced [ˈleːʃnitsa]) is a settlement north of Ormož in northeastern Slovenia. The area belongs to the traditional region of Styria and is now included in the Drava Statistical Region.
