= Stanovno =

- Location in Slovenia
- Coordinates: 46°27′36.62″N 16°8′27.16″E
- Country: Slovenia
- Traditional region: Styria
- Statistical region: Drava
- Municipality: Ormož

Area
  - Total: 2.07 km^{2} (0.80 sq mi)
- Elevation: 236.9 m (777 ft)

Population (2002)
  - Total: 109

Stanovno (pronounced [stanɔu̯ˈnɔ]) is a settlement in the Slovene Hills in the Municipality of Ormož in northeastern Slovenia. The area belongs to the traditional region of Styria. It is now included in the Drava Statistical Region.
