= Trstenik, Ormož =

Trstenik
- Location in Slovenia
- Coordinates: 46°27′42.93″N 16°9′45.03″E
- Country: Slovenia
- Traditional region: Styria
- Statistical region: Drava
- Municipality: Ormož

Area
  - Total: 0.2 km^{2} (0.077 sq mi)

Population (2013)
  - Total: 38
  - Density: 186/km^{2} (480/sq mi)

Trstenik (pronounced [təɾstɛˈniːk]) is a small village in the Municipality of Ormož in northeastern Slovenia. Until 2007, the area was part of the settlement of Mihalovci. The village is part of the traditional region of Styria and is included in the Drava Statistical Region.
