= Bojan Polak =

Major General Bojan Polak
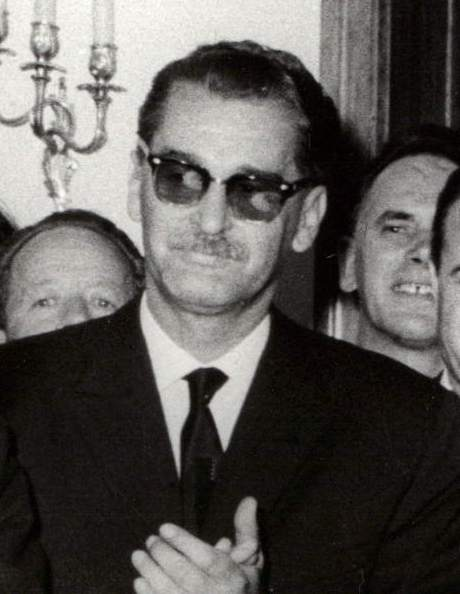

Yugoslav Ambassador to East Germany
- In office 1964–1968

Personal details
- Born: 28 November 1918 Ormož, State of Slovenes, Croats and Serbs
- Died: 4 July 2004 (aged 85) Ljubljana, Slovenia
- Party: League of Communists of Yugoslavia
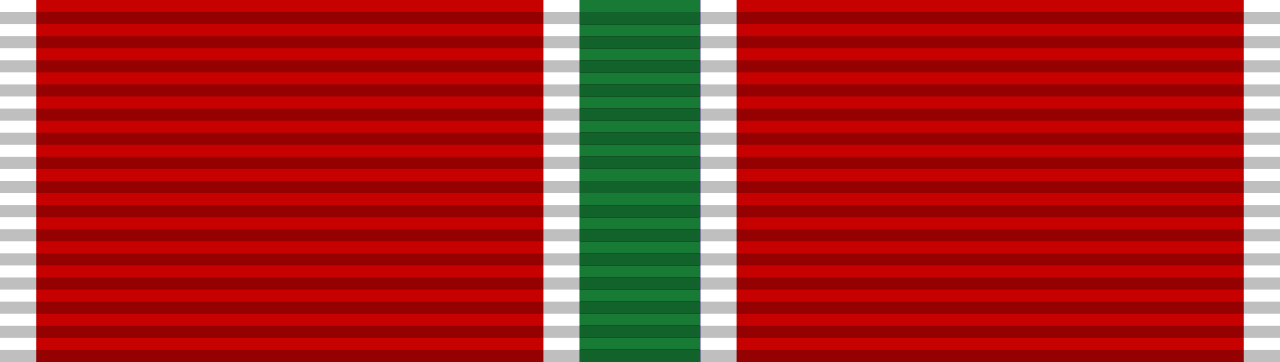
- Awards

Military service
- Allegiance: Kingdom of Yugoslavia; Yugoslavia
- Branch/service: Yugoslav People's Army
- Years of service: 1940–1953
- Rank: Major General
- Battles/wars: World War II

Bojan Polak (nom de guerre Stjenka; 28 November 1918 – 4 July 2004) was a Yugoslav military officer, communist politician, and athlete of Slovene ethnicity.

== Biography ==
Polak was born in Ormož on 28 November 1918, shortly after the end of the First World War. He was raised in Žiri and Ljubljana and showed considerable prowess in athletics, becoming the Yugoslav national champion in decathlon in 1938. He attended the military academy for reserve officers of the Royal Yugoslav Army in Sarajevo and graduated in 1940. Following the defeat of the Royal Army in the April War, he joined the Yugoslav Partisans and by 1943 was made commander of the Ljubo Sercer Shock Brigade. In 1946, Polak was sent to the Soviet Artillery Academy in Moscow, where he remained for two years. In 1953, he retired from military service.

After his retirement from the military, Polak became involved in politics and veterans advocacy. He was appointed the Yugoslav Ambassador to the German Democratic Republic in 1964, a post he held until 1968. In 1969, he was made commander of the Defense Staff of the Territorial Defense of the Socialist Republic of Slovenia. When Marshal Tito died, Polak was one of the guards of honor at his funeral. He was president of the Federation of Veterans Associations of the People's Liberation War from 1983 to 1984, and in 1988 Polak was made president of the ZZB NOV Slovenije, the largest organization for Partisan veterans of the Second World War in Slovenia.

He died in Ljubljana on 4 July 2004.
