= Vladimir Vauhnik =

Yugoslav military officer

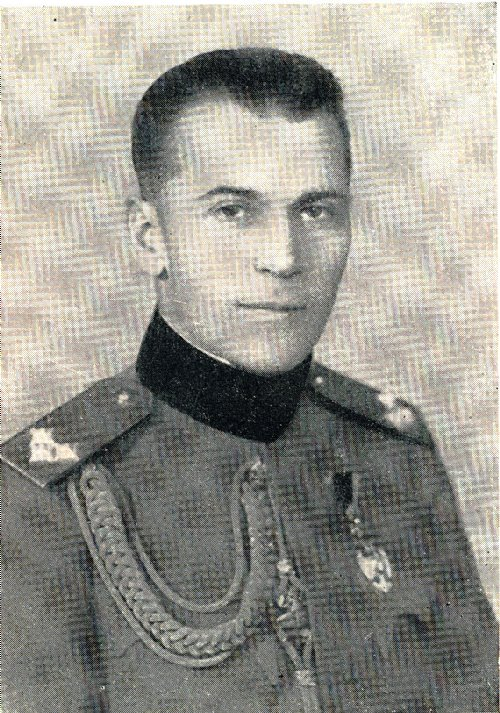
- Vauhnik in 1920s
- Born: June 24, 1896; Svetinje, Austria-Hungary
- Died: March 31, 1955 (aged 58); Buenos Aires, Argentina
- Military career
- Allegiance: Yugoslavia (1941–45)
- Rank: Colonel
- Conflicts: Austro-Slovene conflict in Carinthia

Vladimir Vauhnik (24 June 1896 – 31 May 1955) was a Yugoslav military officer of Slovenian extraction. Vauhnik is most notable for his counterintelligence activities before and during World War II that could have changed the course of the war.

== Early life ==
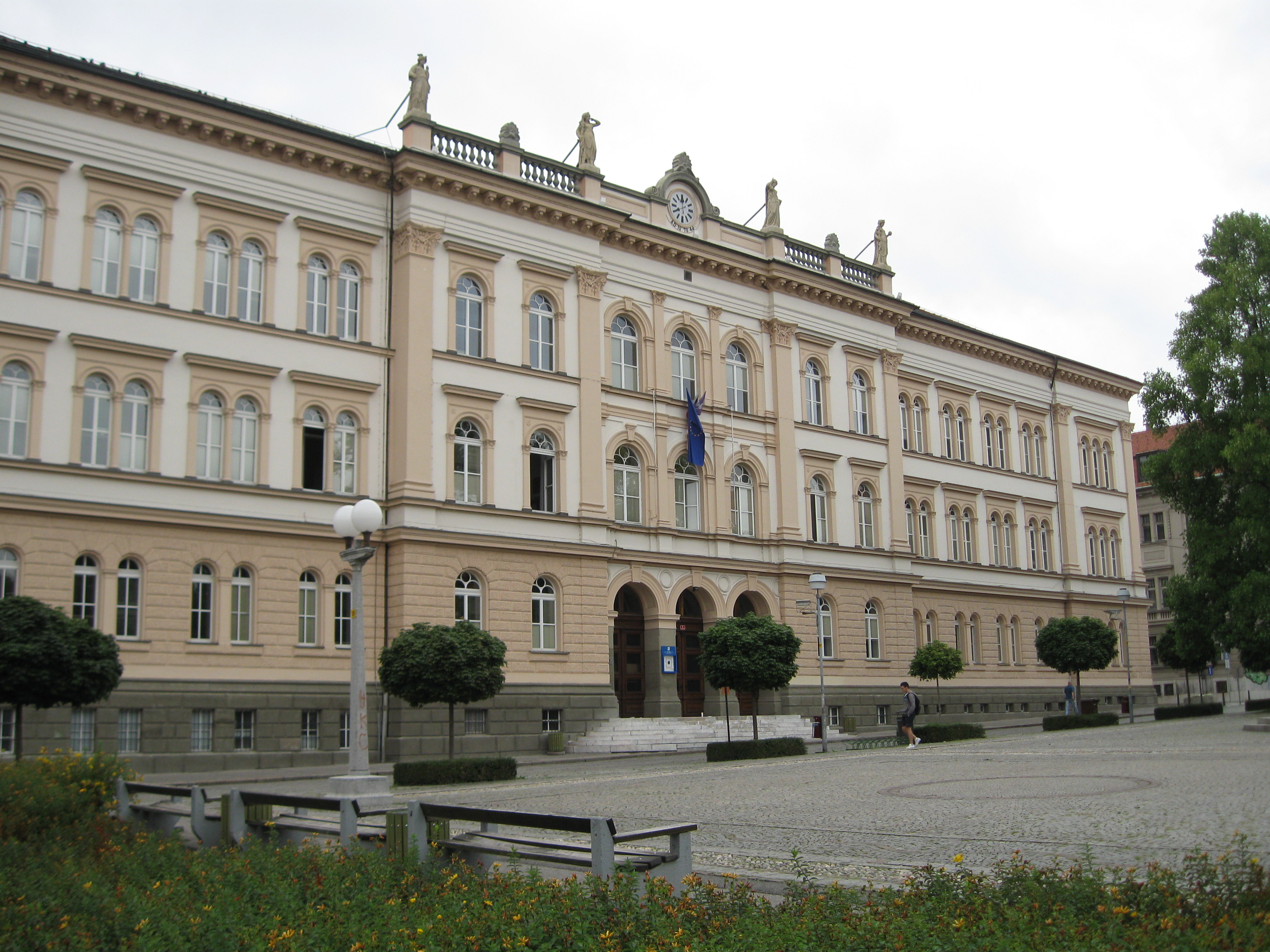
Vauhnik graduated from the First Gymnasium in Maribor

Vauhnik was born on 24 June 1896 in Svetinje, Austria-Hungary (modern-day Slovenia) into a patriotic Slovenian family and was drawn to the military even as a young boy. He graduated from the First Gymnasium in Maribor, became a cadet, and later enrolled in the Theresian Military Academy near Vienna. His parents were teachers.

After World War I, he returned to newly established Yugoslavia and participated in the Austro-Slovene conflict in Carinthia. He was decorated by Yugoslav authorities for his bravery in this conflict and promoted to the rank of captain.

== Prelude to World War II ==
Vauhnik was probably the first in the world who presented information that the Nazi Germany would invade Poland and Yugoslavia and later Soviet Union, based on the covert and legal methods he used.

Based on the orders of Milan Nedić, who was Minister of Defence of the Kingdom of Yugoslavia, Vauhnik visited German supreme command twice, to secure Yugoslav interest in the port of Thessaloniki.

== During World War II ==
Before the outbreak of the World War II Vauhnik had the rank of colonel as a military attaché in Berlin, where he closely cooperated with Ivo Andrić.

According to his own testimony, by 14 March 1941 Vauhnik had "irrefutable proof and even fairly detailed plans" about the initiation of preparations for attacks on Soviet Union by German forces. He emphasized that government of the United Kingdom was informed about those plans.

After Axis invasion of Yugoslavia, Vauhnik was captured in Belgrade and transported to Berlin at the beginning of May 1941 where he was interrogated in Reich Security Main Office. He was released as German citizen because he was born in part of Yugoslavia which was annexed by Germany at that time. After his release Vauhnik went to Zagreb.

In 1942, Vauhnik forged a plan to transport King Peter II of Yugoslavia to Axis occupied Yugoslavia to mobilize Serbs and Croats under his command. His plan was based on the fact that German forces were entingled on Eastern Front while Italians could be convinced not to interfere.

Vauhnik was a coworker of Ivan Prezelj, commander of Slovenian Chetniks (Blue Guard). Vauhnik was initiator for establishment of the Military Council of all Slovene liberal political movements (Slovene: Zveza). Vauhnik was at that time on the position of acting commander of the Headquarter of the Chetniks in Slovenia.

According to some sources, Vauhnik travelled to Switzerland in June 1944 to offer to put Slovene Home Guard forces (Slovene: domobranci), some soldiers of the Independent State of Croatia, and some Chetnik units under British command. His offer was rejected by the British representatives.

== After World War II ==
After World War II Vauhnik went to Buenos Aires, Argentina, where he lived quietly without joining any Yugoslav émigré groups. Vauhnik died on 31 May 1955, aged 58, in Buenos Aires.

== Bibliography ==
Works by/about Vauhnik include:

- Vauhnik, Vladimir (1967). Memoiren eines Militärattachés: (Ein Kampf gegen das Fingerspitzengefühl Hitlers) [Mit Abbildungen, Diagramm, und Karten-Skizze]. Editorial Palabra Eslovena.
- Vauhnik, Vladimir (1972). Nevidna fronta. Delo.
- Krizman, Bogdan (1986). Pavelić u bjekstvu. Globus. ISBN 9788634301397.

== Sources ==
- Podbregar, Iztok; Ivanusa, Teodora (6 December 2016). The Anatomy of Counterintelligence: European Perspective. Bentham Science Publishers. ISBN 978-1-68108-411-4.
- Zalar, Charles (1961). Yugoslav Communism: A Critical Study. U.S.GovernmentPrint.Office.
- Jukić, Ilija (1974). The fall of Yugoslavia. Harcourt Brace Jovanovich. ISBN 9780151301003.
- Dimitrijević, Bojan; Nikolić, Kosta (2004). Đeneral Mihailović: biografija. Институт за савремену историју (Belgrade, Serbia). ISBN 9788674030950.
- Trifković, Srdja (1998). Ustaša: Croatian separatism and european politics 1929-1945. The Lord Byron Foundation for Balkan Studies. ISBN 9781892478009.
- Mitić, Miodrag (2002). Poete u fraku. ISBN 9788673633299.
- Bevc, Vladislav (2007). Liberal Forces in Twentieth Century Yugoslavia: Memoirs of Ladislav Bevc. Peter Lang. ISBN 978-1-4331-0008-6.
- Sirc, Ljubo (1989). Between Hitler and Tito: Nazi Occupation and Communist Oppression. André Deutsch. ISBN 978-0-233-98405-6.
- Vojinović, Aleksandar (1988). Leon Rupnik. Centar za informacije i publicitet. ISBN 978-86-7125-030-6.
- Rahten, Andrej (2009). Nova slovenska biografija. Založba ZRC, ZRC SAZU. ISBN 978-961-254-131-6.
- Лесковац, Младен; Форишковић, Александар; Попов, Чедомир (2004). Српски биографски речник. Будућност. ISBN 9788683651627.
