= Trgovišče =

- Location in Slovenia
- Coordinates: 46°24′49.19″N 16°5′38.36″E
- Country: Slovenia
- Traditional region: Styria
- Statistical region: Drava
- Municipality: Ormož

Area
  - Total: 5.95 km^{2} (2.30 sq mi)
- Elevation: 197.9 m (649 ft)

Population (2002)
  - Total: 218

Trgovišče (pronounced [ˈtəɾɡɔʋiʃtʃɛ]) is a settlement on the left bank of the Drava River on the road from Ptuj to Ormož in the Municipality of Ormož in northeastern Slovenia. Although the main core of the settlement is built on and around the main road, its territory extends south towards the Drava, right to the border with Croatia. The area belongs to the traditional region of Styria. It is now included in the Drava Statistical Region.
