= Vinski Vrh, Ormož =

Vinski Vrh
- Location in Slovenia
- Coordinates: 46°27′32.05″N 16°12′11.1″E
- Country: Slovenia
- Traditional region: Styria
- Statistical region: Drava
- Municipality: Ormož

Area
  - Total: 2.51 km^{2} (0.97 sq mi)
- Elevation: 304.1 m (998 ft)

Population (2002)
  - Total: 242

Vinski Vrh (pronounced [ˈʋiːnski ˈʋəɾx], German: Weinberg) is a settlement in the vineyard-covered Slovene Hills northeast of Ormož in northeastern Slovenia. The area belongs to the traditional region of Styria. It is now included in the Drava Statistical Region.
