= Žvab =

- Location in Slovenia
- Coordinates: 46°28′1.46″N 16°7′31.43″E
- Country: Slovenia
- Traditional region: Styria
- Statistical region: Drava
- Municipality: Ormož

Area
  - Total: 0.78 km^{2} (0.30 sq mi)
- Elevation: 310.5 m (1,019 ft)

Population (2002)
  - Total: 92

Žvab (pronounced [ˈʒʋaːp], German: Schwaben) is a small settlement in the Municipality of Ormož in northeastern Slovenia. The area belongs to the traditional region of Styria. It is now included in the Drava Statistical Region.
