= Vuzmetinci =

- Location in Slovenia
- Coordinates: 46°27′51.78″N 16°13′45.28″E
- Country: Slovenia
- Traditional region: Styria
- Statistical region: Drava
- Municipality: Ormož

Area
  - Total: 2.14 km^{2} (0.83 sq mi)
- Elevation: 230.8 m (757 ft)

Population (2026)
  - Total: 132

Vuzmetinci (pronounced [ʋuˈzmeːtintsi]) is a settlement in the Municipality of Ormož in northeastern Slovenia. It lies in the Slovene Hills close to the border with Croatia. The area belongs to the traditional region of Styria. It is now included in the Drava Statistical Region.
