= Vičanci =

- Location in Slovenia
- Coordinates: 46°26′45.17″N 16°5′25.55″E
- Country: Slovenia
- Traditional region: Styria
- Statistical region: Drava
- Municipality: Ormož

Area
  - Total: 3.68 km^{2} (1.42 sq mi)
- Elevation: 288.2 m (946 ft)

Population (2002)
  - Total: 241

Vičanci (pronounced [ˈʋiːtʃantsi]) is a settlement in the Slovene Hills northwest of Ormož in northeastern Slovenia. The area belongs to the traditional region of Styria. It is now included in the Drava Statistical Region.

There is a small roadside chapel with a belfry in the northern part of the settlement. It was built in the early 20th century.
