= Hermanci =

- Location in Slovenia
- Coordinates: 46°28′41.35″N 16°13′13.58″E
- Country: Slovenia
- Traditional region: Styria
- Statistical region: Drava
- Municipality: Ormož

Area
  - Total: 2.64 km^{2} (1.02 sq mi)
- Elevation: 238.5 m (782 ft)

Population (2002)
  - Total: 157

Hermanci (pronounced [ˈxɛːɾmantsi], German: Hermanetz) is a dispersed settlement in the Municipality of Ormož in northeastern Slovenia, on the border with Croatia. The area is part of the traditional region of Styria and is now included in the Drava Statistical Region.

There is an 18th-century Baroque mansion in the settlement known as Temnar Mansion. It was built on the site of an older mansion, first mentioned as an estate in written documents dating to the 13th century. It is located on a hill amid vineyards and also has a small museum of viticulture.
