= Cerovec Stanka Vraza =

Cerovec Stanka Vraza Cerovec (until 1980)
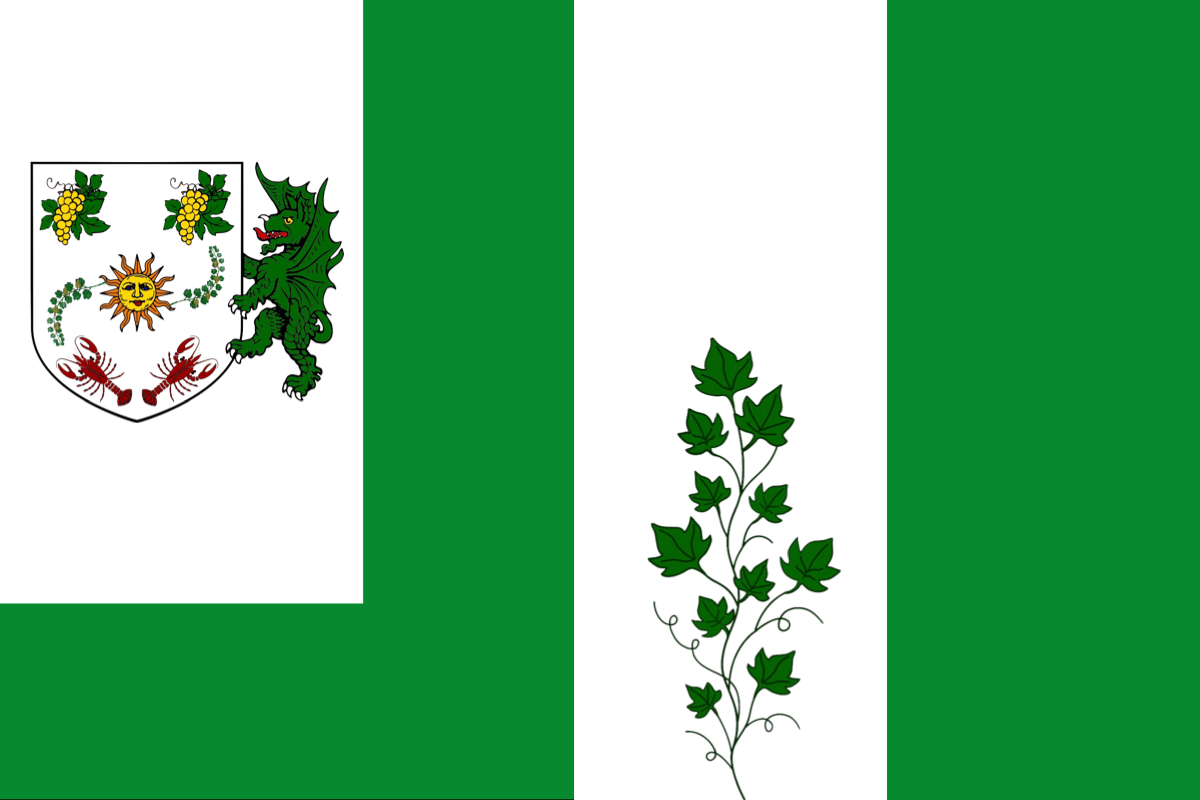
- Flag

- Location in Slovenia
- Coordinates: 46°28′55.68″N 16°9′59.78″E
- Country: Slovenia
- Traditional region: Styria
- Statistical region: Drava
- Municipality: Ormož
- Elevation: 300.1 m (985 ft)

Population (2002)
  - Total: 112

Cerovec Stanka Vraza (pronounced [tsɛˈɾɔːʋəts ˈstaːŋka ˈʋɾaːza]) is a village in the Municipality of Ormož in northeastern Slovenia. The area belongs to the traditional Styria region and is now included in the Drava Statistical Region.

== Name ==
The name of the settlement was changed from Cerovec to Cerovec Stanka Vraza in 1980.

== Cultural heritage ==
The village is the birthplace of Stanko Vraz, after whom it was renamed (as well as to differentiate it from a number of other settlements in Slovenia named Cerovec). The house in which Vraz was born in 1810 is preserved, and a commemorative plaque was unveiled on it in 1951.
