= Hum pri Ormožu =

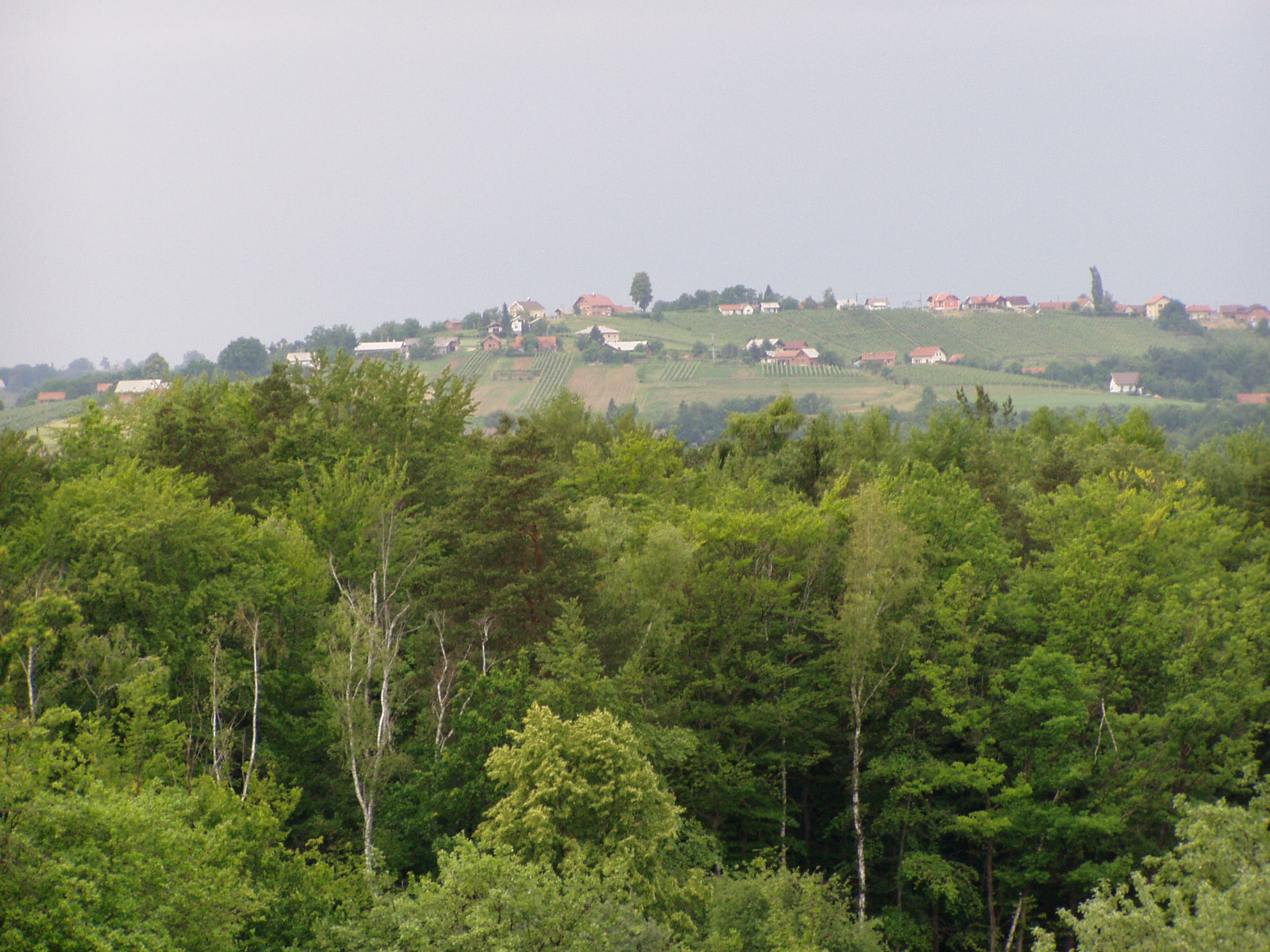

- Location in Slovenia
- Coordinates: 46°24′51.01″N 16°11′40.48″E
- Country: Slovenia
- Traditional region: Styria
- Statistical region: Drava
- Municipality: Ormož

Area
  - Total: 3.83 km^{2} (1.48 sq mi)
- Elevation: 266 m (873 ft)

Population (2002)
  - Total: 322

Hum pri Ormožu (pronounced [ˈxuːm pɾi ˈoːɾmɔʒu], German: Kulmberg) is a settlement in the Municipality of Ormož in northeastern Slovenia. The area is part of the traditional region of Styria and is now included in the Drava Statistical Region.

The local church is dedicated to John the Baptist and belongs to the Parish of Ormož. It was built in 1611 and has a rectangular barrel vaulted nave with a three sided sanctuary and a belfry on its western facade.
