= Veliki Brebrovnik =

- Location in Slovenia
- Coordinates: 46°26′48.28″N 16°11′44.83″E
- Country: Slovenia
- Traditional region: Styria
- Statistical region: Drava
- Municipality: Ormož

Area
  - Total: 3.03 km^{2} (1.17 sq mi)
- Elevation: 274 m (899 ft)

Population (2002)
  - Total: 244

Veliki Brebrovnik (pronounced [ˈʋeːliki bɾɛˈbɾoːu̯nik]) is a dispersed settlement in the Slovene Hills northeast of Ormož in northeastern Slovenia. The area belongs to the traditional region of Styria. It is now included in the Drava Statistical Region.

There is a small roadside chapel in the southern part of the settlement. It is dedicated to Our Lady of Lourdes and was built in 1908.
