= Hujbar =

- Location in Slovenia
- Coordinates: 46°29′20.56″N 16°8′39.19″E
- Country: Slovenia
- Traditional region: Styria
- Statistical region: Drava
- Municipality: Ormož

Area
  - Total: 0.4 km^{2} (0.15 sq mi)
- Elevation: 294 m (965 ft)

Population (2002)
  - Total: 27

Hujbar (pronounced [ˈxuːi̯baɾ], German: Huber) is a small settlement in the Slovene Hills in the Municipality of Ormož in northeastern Slovenia. The area belongs to the traditional region of Styria and is now included in the Drava Statistical Region.
