= Strezetina =

- Location in Slovenia
- Coordinates: 46°27′8.65″N 16°8′38.29″E
- Country: Slovenia
- Traditional region: Styria
- Statistical region: Drava
- Municipality: Ormož

Area
  - Total: 0.89 km^{2} (0.34 sq mi)
- Elevation: 301.6 m (990 ft)

Population (2002)
  - Total: 69

Strezetina (pronounced [ˈstɾeːzɛtina]) is a small settlement in the Slovene Hills in the Municipality of Ormož in northeastern Slovenia. The area belongs to the traditional region of Styria. It is now included in the Drava Statistical Region.
