= Varaždin Hydroelectric Power Plant =

Hydroelectric power plant

- Country: Croatia
- Coordinates: 46°20′53″N 16°16′05″E

Power generation
- Nameplate capacity: 94 MW

Varaždin Hydroelectric Power Plant is a hydroelectric power plant on the river Drava, near the city of Varaždin located in Varaždin County, in northwest Croatia.

The Varaždin Hydroelectric Power Plant is a multipurpose hydroelectric plant harnessing the Drava water power on a 28.5 km long stretch, providing flood and erosion control for the land and settlements, enabling water supply, draining excessive soil moisture content and offering the possibilities for gravity drainage of the valley and gravity land irrigation. Installed power at generator terminals is 86 MW, and the possible average annual output is 476 GWh.

The dam created the Lake Ormož reservoir that stretches across the border with Slovenia.

== See also ==
- Hrvatska elektroprivreda
