= Jastrebci =

- Location in Slovenia
- Coordinates: 46°26′51.2″N 16°15′15.29″E
- Country: Slovenia
- Traditional region: Styria
- Statistical region: Drava
- Municipality: Ormož

Area
  - Total: 1.82 km^{2} (0.70 sq mi)
- Elevation: 260 m (850 ft)

Population (2002)
  - Total: 175

Jastrebci (pronounced [ˈjaːstɾɛptsi], German: Jastrovetz) is a small dispersed settlement in the hills northeast of Ormož in northeastern Slovenia, right on the border with Croatia. The area belongs to the traditional region of Styria and is now included in the Drava Statistical Region.
