= Žerovinci =

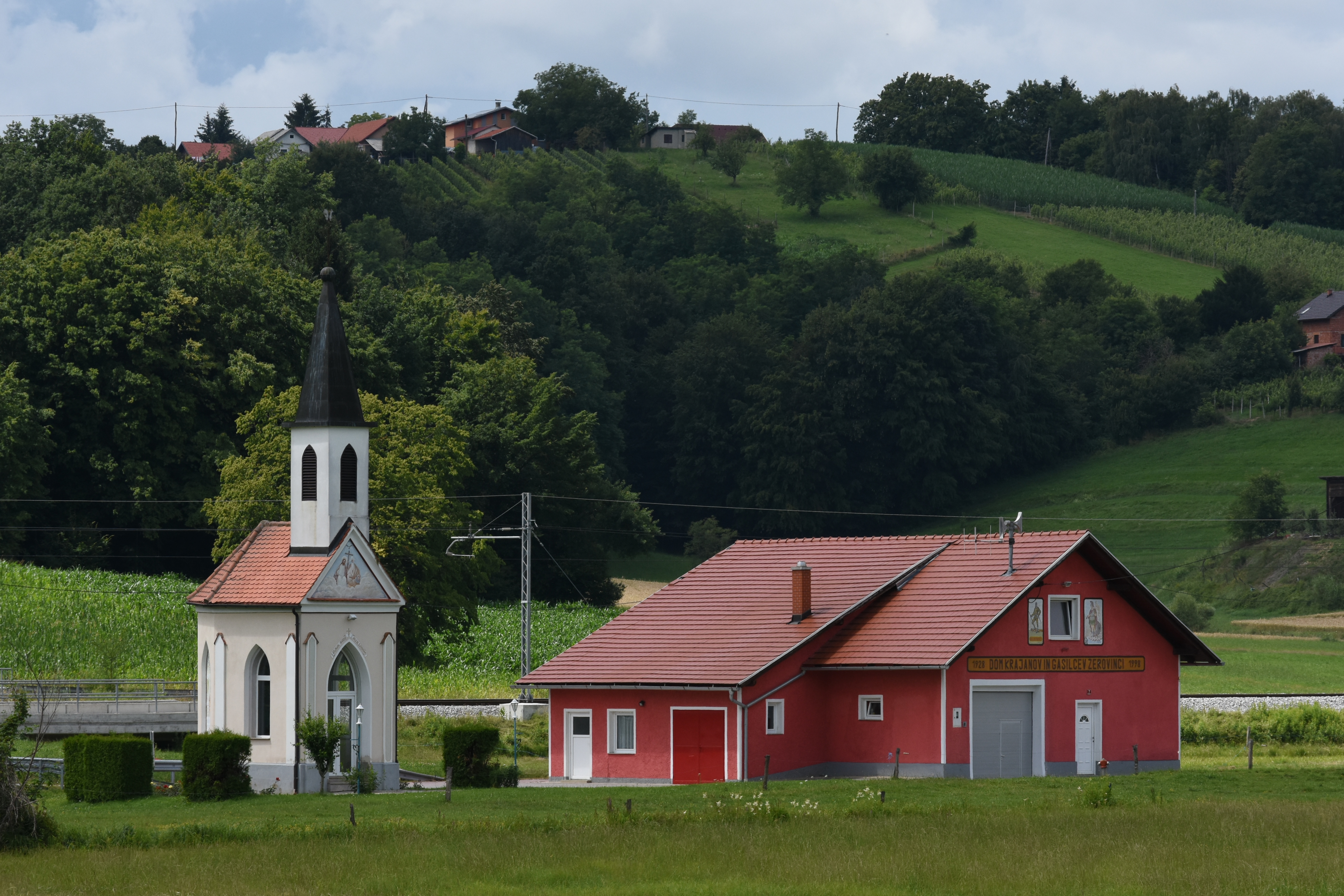

- Location in Slovenia
- Coordinates: 46°29′33.27″N 16°9′25.88″E
- Country: Slovenia
- Traditional region: Styria
- Statistical region: Drava
- Municipality: Ormož

Area
  - Total: 3.32 km^{2} (1.28 sq mi)
- Elevation: 284.3 m (933 ft)

Population (2002)
  - Total: 311

Žerovinci (pronounced [ʒɛɾɔˈʋiːntsi], German: Scherovinzen) is a settlement in the Municipality of Ormož in northeastern Slovenia. It lies on the main road from Ormož to Ljutomer, and the railway line from Maribor to Murska Sobota runs through the settlement. The area traditionally belonged to the region of Styria. It is now included in the Drava Statistical Region.

There is a small chapel with a belfry in the settlement. It was built in the early 20th century.
