= Vodranci =

- Location in Slovenia
- Coordinates: 46°26′12.09″N 16°15′8.3″E
- Country: Slovenia
- Traditional region: Styria
- Statistical region: Drava
- Municipality: Ormož

Area
  - Total: 3.64 km^{2} (1.41 sq mi)
- Elevation: 209.4 m (687 ft)

Population (2002)
  - Total: 146

Vodranci (pronounced [ʋɔˈdɾaːntsi]) is a settlement in the Municipality of Ormož in northeastern Slovenia. It lies north of Središče ob Dravi, close to the border with Croatia. The area belongs to the traditional region of Styria. It is now included in the Drava Statistical Region.

There is a small roadside chapel in the northeastern part of the settlement. It was built in the early 20th century.
