= Mihalovci =

- Location in Slovenia
- Coordinates: 46°27′6.63″N 16°9′49.48″E
- Country: Slovenia
- Traditional region: Styria
- Statistical region: Drava
- Municipality: Ormož

Area
  - Total: 2.3 km^{2} (0.89 sq mi)
- Elevation: 219.5 m (720 ft)

Population (2014)
  - Total: 145
  - Density: 62/km^{2} (160/sq mi)

Mihalovci (pronounced [miˈxaːlɔu̯tsi]) is a settlement in the Slovene Hills north of Ormož, east of the Ormož–Hodoš Railway, in northeastern Slovenia. The area belongs to the traditional region of Styria and is now included in the Drava Statistical Region. In 2005, the village of Svetinje ceded from Mihalovci.
