= Bresnica, Ormož =

Bresnica
- Location in Slovenia
- Coordinates: 46°26′34.4″N 16°2′17.12″E
- Country: Slovenia
- Traditional region: Styria
- Statistical region: Drava
- Municipality: Ormož

Area
  - Total: 4.49 km^{2} (1.73 sq mi)
- Elevation: 282.8 m (928 ft)

Population (2002)
  - Total: 237

Bresnica (pronounced [bɾɛˈsniːtsa], in older sources Breznica, German: Wresnitzen) is a settlement in the Municipality of Ormož in northeastern Slovenia. The area belongs to the traditional Styria region and is now included in the Drava Statistical Region.

== Name ==
Before the Second World War, the village was named Breznica. It was known as Wresnitzen in German in the past.
