= Gomila pri Kogu =

- Location in Slovenia
- Coordinates: 46°28′40.91″N 16°14′53.9″E
- Country: Slovenia
- Traditional region: Styria
- Statistical region: Drava
- Municipality: Ormož

Area
  - Total: 2.06 km^{2} (0.80 sq mi)
- Elevation: 283.7 m (931 ft)

Population (2002)
  - Total: 175

Gomila pri Kogu (pronounced [ɡɔˈmiːla pɾi ˈkoːɡu]) is a settlement located in the hills northeast of Ormož, in northeastern Slovenia, near the border with Croatia. The area belongs to the traditional region of Styria and is now part of the Drava Statistical Region.

== Name ==
The name of the settlement was changed from Gomila to Gomila pri Kogu in 1955.
