= Kog =

- Location in Slovenia
- Coordinates: 46°27′31.9″N 16°13′26.08″E
- Country: Slovenia
- Traditional region: Styria
- Statistical region: Drava
- Municipality: Ormož

Area
  - Total: 0.86 km^{2} (0.33 sq mi)
- Elevation: 319.4 m (1,048 ft)

Population (2002)
  - Total: 164

Kog (pronounced [ˈkoːk], German: Kaag) is a village in the hills northeast of Ormož in northeastern Slovenia, right on the border with Croatia. The area is part of the traditional region of Styria and is now included in the Drava Statistical Region.

The parish church in the village is dedicated to Saint Wolfgang (Slovene: sveti Bolfenk) and belongs to the Roman Catholic Archdiocese of Maribor. The church was built in 1688, but greatly damaged in the Second World War and rebuilt in the second half of the 20th century.

The village was unofficially known as Sveti Bolfenk pri Središču (German: St. Wolfgang bei Polstrau) in the past.
