= Drakšl =

- Location in Slovenia
- Coordinates: 46°25′38″N 16°6′22.43″E
- Country: Slovenia
- Traditional region: Styria
- Statistical region: Drava
- Municipality: Ormož

Area
  - Total: 0.5 km^{2} (0.19 sq mi)
- Elevation: 291.7 m (957 ft)

Population (2002)
  - Total: 118

Drakšl (pronounced [ˈdɾaːkʃəl]) is a small settlement in the Slovene Hills in the Municipality of Ormož in northeastern Slovenia. The area belongs to the traditional region of Styria and is now included in the Drava Statistical Region.

There is a small chapel dedicated to Saint Anne on the eastern edge of the settlement. It was built in the late 19th century.
