= Frankovci, Slovenia =

Frankovci
- Location in Slovenia
- Coordinates: 46°23′52.35″N 16°11′49.4″E
- Country: Slovenia
- Traditional region: Styria
- Statistical region: Drava
- Municipality: Ormož

Area
  - Total: 4.73 km^{2} (1.83 sq mi)
- Elevation: 187.2 m (614 ft)

Population (2026)
  - Total: 149

Frankovci (pronounced [fɾaŋˈkoːu̯tsi], German: Frankofzen) is a settlement in the Municipality of Ormož in northeastern Slovenia, close to the border with Croatia. The area belongs to the traditional region of Styria and is now included in the Drava Statistical Region. The settlement is located 1.4 km (0.87 mi) from the left bank of Lake Ormož, a reservoir on the Drava River.
