= Municipality of Ormož =

Municipality of Slovenia

Municipality of Ormož Občina Ormož
- Municipality
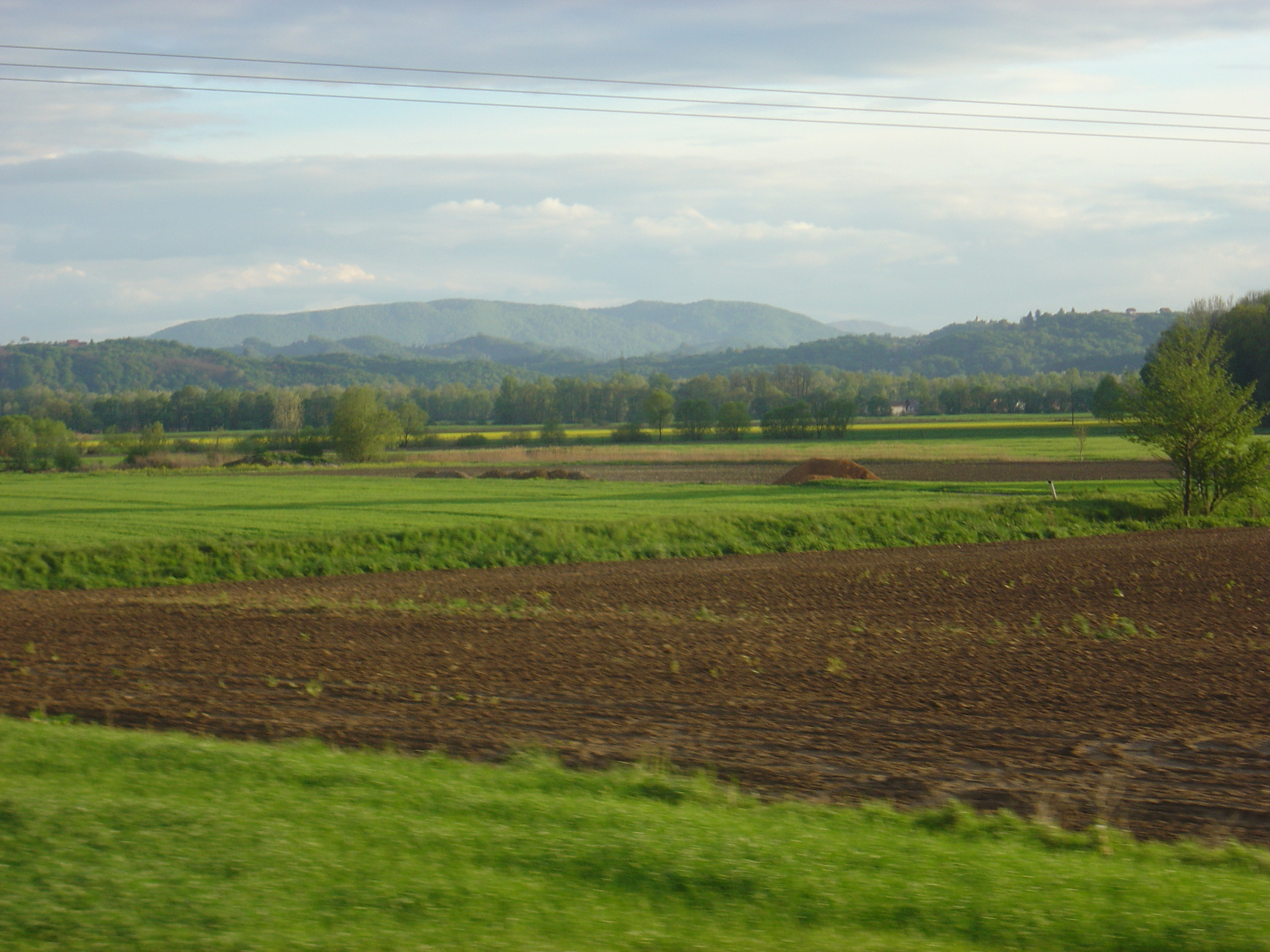

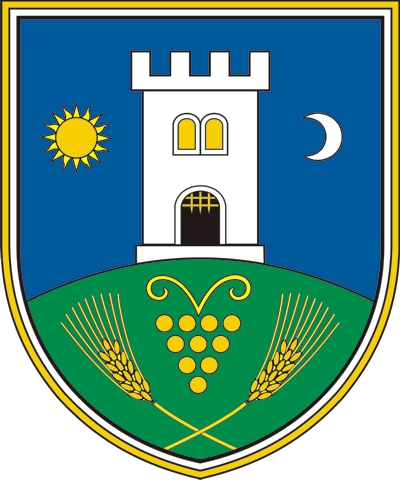
- Coat of arms

- Location of the Municipality of Ormož in Slovenia
- Coordinates: 46°25′N 16°09′E
- Country: Slovenia

Government
  - Mayor: Danijel Vrbnjak (SDS)

Area
  - Total: 141.6 km^{2} (54.7 sq mi)

Population (2016)
  - Total: 12,288
  - Density: 86.78/km^{2} (224.8/sq mi)
- Time zone: UTC+01 (CET)
  - Summer (DST): UTC+02 (CEST)
- Website: www.ormoz.si

The Municipality of Ormož (pronounced [ˈoːɾmɔʃ]; Slovene: Občina Ormož) is a municipality in the traditional region of Styria in northeastern Slovenia. The seat of the municipality is the town of Ormož. Ormož became a municipality in 1994. It borders Croatia.

== Geography ==
The municipality includes Jeruzalem–Ormož Hills Nature Park (Slovene: Krajinski park Jeruzalemsko - ormoške gorice), which covers 1,911 hectares (4,720 acres).

=== Settlements ===
In addition to the municipal seat of Ormož, the municipality also includes the following settlements:

- Bresnica
- Cerovec Stanka Vraza
- Cvetkovci
- Dobrava
- Dobrovščak
- Drakšl
- Frankovci
- Gomila pri Kogu
- Hajndl
- Hardek
- Hermanci
- Hujbar
- Hum pri Ormožu
- Ivanjkovci
- Jastrebci
- Kajžar
- Kog
- Krčevina
- Lačaves
- Lahonci
- Lešnica
- Lešniški Vrh
- Libanja
- Litmerk
- Loperšice
- Lunovec
- Mali Brebrovnik
- Mihalovci
- Mihovci pri Veliki Nedelji
- Miklavž pri Ormožu
- Osluševci
- Pavlovci
- Pavlovski Vrh
- Podgorci
- Preclava
- Pušenci
- Ritmerk
- Runeč
- Šardinje
- Senešci
- Sodinci
- Spodnji Ključarovci
- Stanovno
- Strezetina
- Strjanci
- Strmec pri Ormožu
- Svetinje
- Trgovišče
- Trstenik
- Veličane
- Velika Nedelja
- Veliki Brebrovnik
- Vičanci
- Vinski Vrh
- Vitan
- Vodranci
- Vuzmetinci
- Zasavci
- Žerovinci
- Žvab
