= Ivanjkovci =

- Location in Slovenia
- Coordinates: 46°27′48.59″N 16°9′0.22″E
- Country: Slovenia
- Traditional region: Styria
- Statistical region: Drava
- Municipality: Ormož

Area
  - Total: 2.23 km^{2} (0.86 sq mi)
- Elevation: 220.6 m (724 ft)

Population (2002)
  - Total: 277

Ivanjkovci (pronounced [iˈʋaːŋkɔu̯tsi]; German: Ivankofzen) is a settlement in the Municipality of Ormož in northeastern Slovenia. The area belongs to the traditional Styria region and is now included in the Drava Statistical Region.

The railway line from Maribor to Murska Sobota runs through the settlement.
