= Šmarčna =

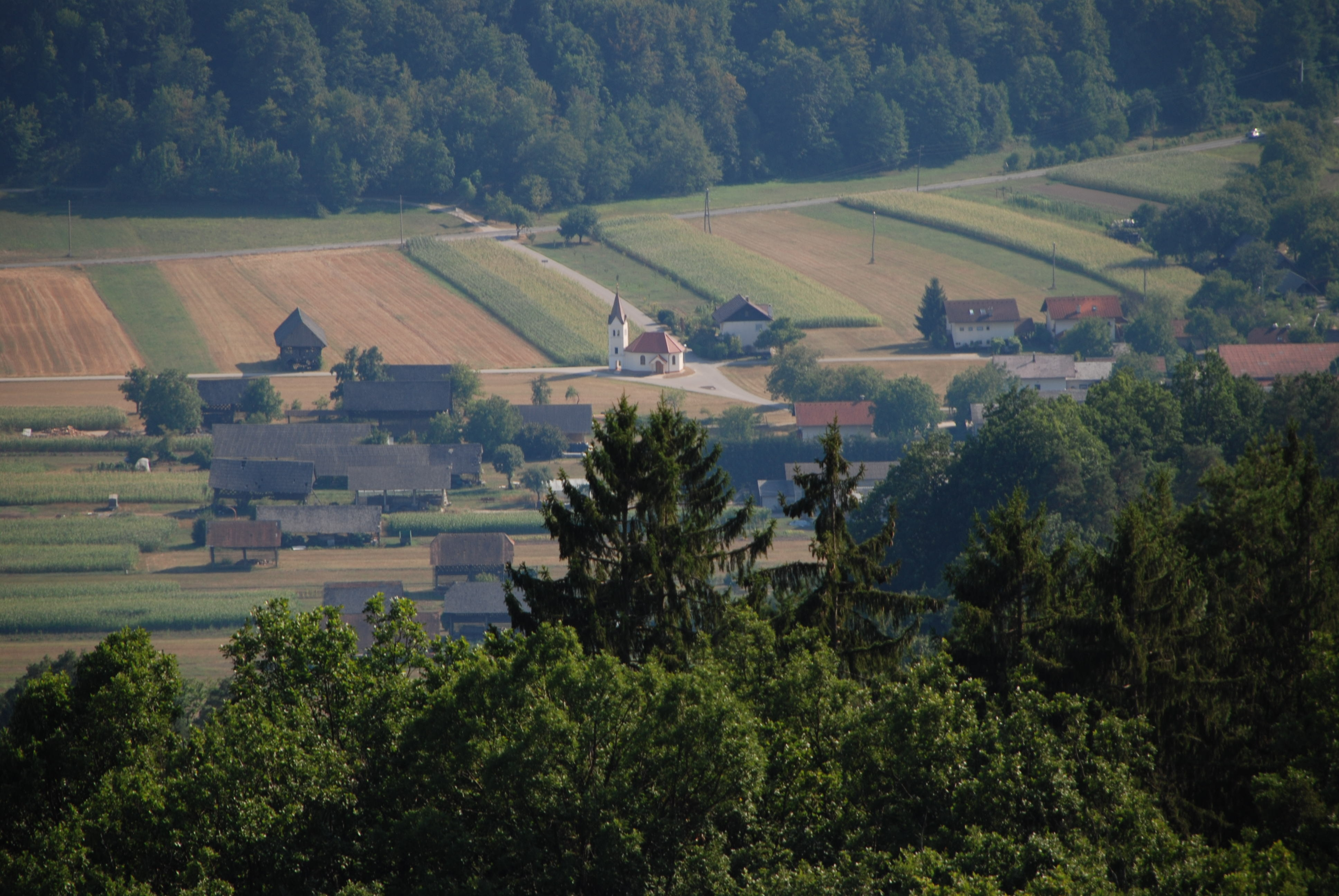

- Location in Slovenia
- Coordinates: 46°2′38.7″N 15°14′50.76″E
- Country: Slovenia
- Traditional region: Lower Carniola
- Statistical region: Lower Sava
- Municipality: Sevnica

Area
  - Total: 1.44 km^{2} (0.56 sq mi)
- Elevation: 185.6 m (609 ft)

Population (2002)
  - Total: 95

Šmarčna (pronounced [ˈʃmaːɾtʃna]) is a settlement on the right bank of the Sava River in the Municipality of Sevnica in east-central Slovenia. The area is part of the historical region of Lower Carniola. The municipality is now included in the Lower Sava Statistical Region. The settlement includes the hamlet of Gomila (or Spodnji Erkenštajn, German: Unteerckenstein, Untererkenstein).

== History ==
Settlement of Šmarčna in prehistoric times is attested by Hallstatt culture finds. In the Middle Ages, Lower Erkenstin Castle (German: Untererkenstein, Slovene: Spodnji Erkenštajn) stood in the hamlet of Gomila. During the Second World War, the German authorities deported the population of the village and settled Gottschee Germans there. The village was burned one week before the end of the war.

=== Mass grave ===
Šmarčna is the site of a mass grave from the end of the Second World War. The Šmarčna Čeček Field Mass Grave (Slovene: Grobišče Šmarčna na čečkovi njivi) lies south of the settlement on a lot by the house at Šmarčna no. 2. It contains the remains of eight Ustaša soldiers killed in May 1945 while withdrawing towards Austria.

== Church ==
The local church is dedicated to Mary Help of Christians (Slovene: Marija Pomočnica) and belongs to the Parish of Boštanj. It was built in 1970 on the site of an older chapel that was incorporated into the new building.
