= Miklavž pri Ormožu =

Miklavž pri Ormožu Sveti Miklavž pri Ormožu (until 1955)
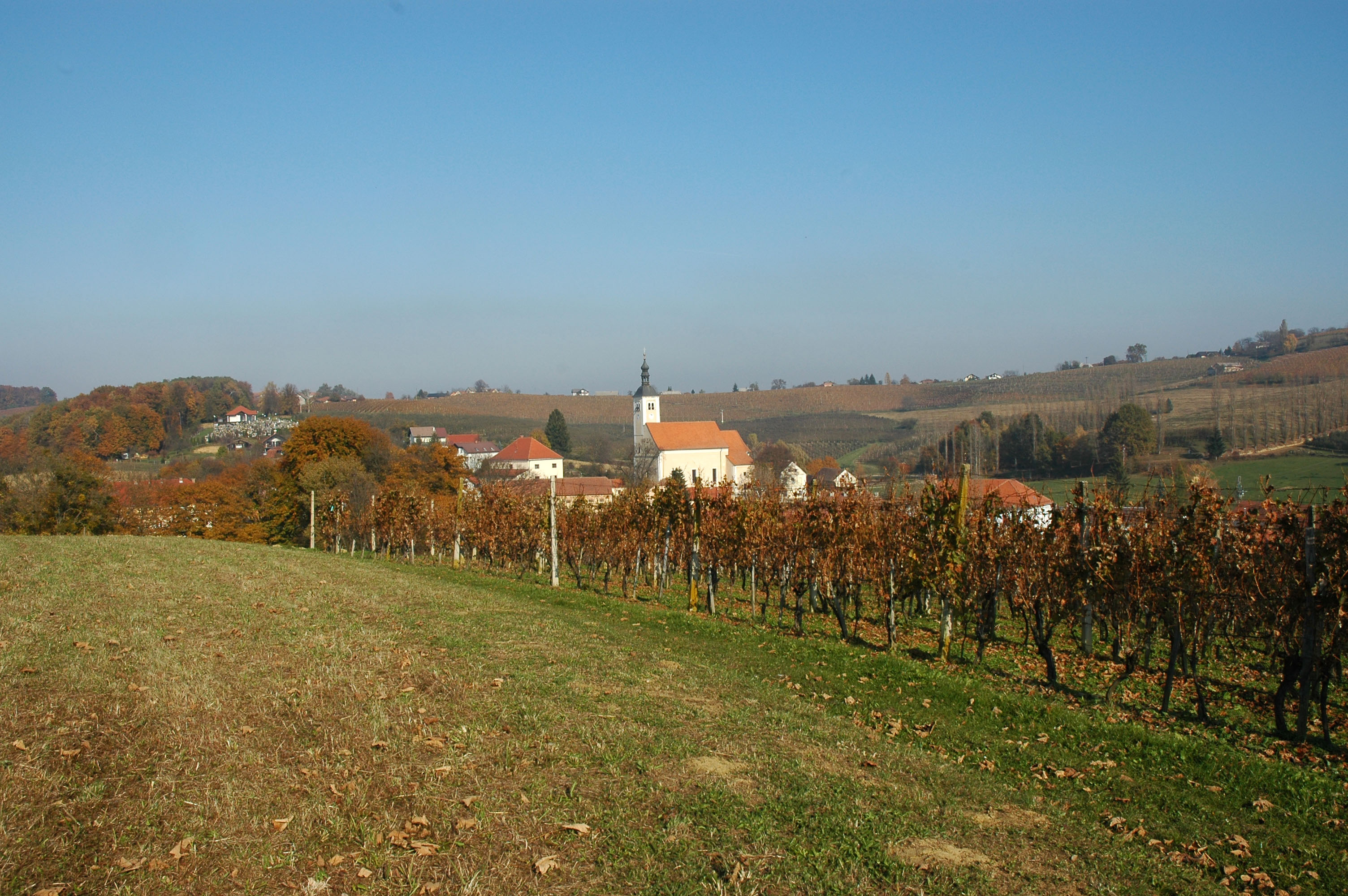

- Location in Slovenia
- Coordinates: 46°27′32.58″N 16°12′52.82″E
- Country: Slovenia
- Traditional region: Styria
- Statistical region: Drava
- Municipality: Ormož

Area
  - Total: 4.32 km^{2} (1.67 sq mi)
- Elevation: 231.8 m (760 ft)

Population (2002)
  - Total: 262

Miklavž pri Ormožu (pronounced [miˈklaːu̯ʃ pɾi ˈoːɾmɔʒu]) is a settlement in the hills northeast of Ormož in northeastern Slovenia. The area traditionally belongs to the Styria region and is now included in the Drava Statistical Region.

== Name ==
The name of the settlement was changed from Sveti Miklavž pri Ormožu (literally, 'Saint Nicholas near Ormož') to Miklavž pri Ormožu (literally, 'Nicholas near Ormož') in 1955. The name was changed on the basis of the 1948 Law on Names of Settlements and Designations of Squares, Streets, and Buildings as part of efforts by Slovenia's postwar communist government to remove religious elements from toponyms.

== Church ==
The parish church, from which the settlement gets its name, is dedicated to Saint Nicholas (Slovene: sveti Miklavž). It belongs to the Roman Catholic Archdiocese of Maribor. It was built between 1683 and 1692 in the Baroque style.
