= Osluševci =

- Location in Slovenia
- Coordinates: 46°24′33.92″N 16°2′51.35″E
- Country: Slovenia
- Traditional region: Styria
- Statistical region: Drava
- Municipality: Ormož

Area
  - Total: 2.31 km^{2} (0.89 sq mi)
- Elevation: 203.3 m (667 ft)

Population (2002)
  - Total: 200

Osluševci (pronounced [ɔˈsluːʃɛu̯tsi], German: Osluschofzen) is a settlement in the Municipality of Ormož in northeastern Slovenia. The area belongs to the traditional region of Styria and is now included in the Drava Statistical Region.
