= Pavlovci, Ormož =

Pavlovci
- Location in Slovenia
- Coordinates: 46°25′9.67″N 16°10′24.92″E
- Country: Slovenia
- Traditional region: Styria
- Statistical region: Drava
- Municipality: Ormož

Area
  - Total: 2.79 km^{2} (1.08 sq mi)
- Elevation: 208.4 m (684 ft)

Population (2002)
  - Total: 191

Pavlovci (pronounced [ˈpaːu̯lɔu̯tsi], German: Paulofzen) is a settlement in the Municipality of Ormož in northeastern Slovenia. The area belongs to the traditional region of Styria and is now included in the Drava Statistical Region.

The railway line from Maribor to Murska Sobota runs through the settlement.
