= Podgorci, Ormož =

Podgorci
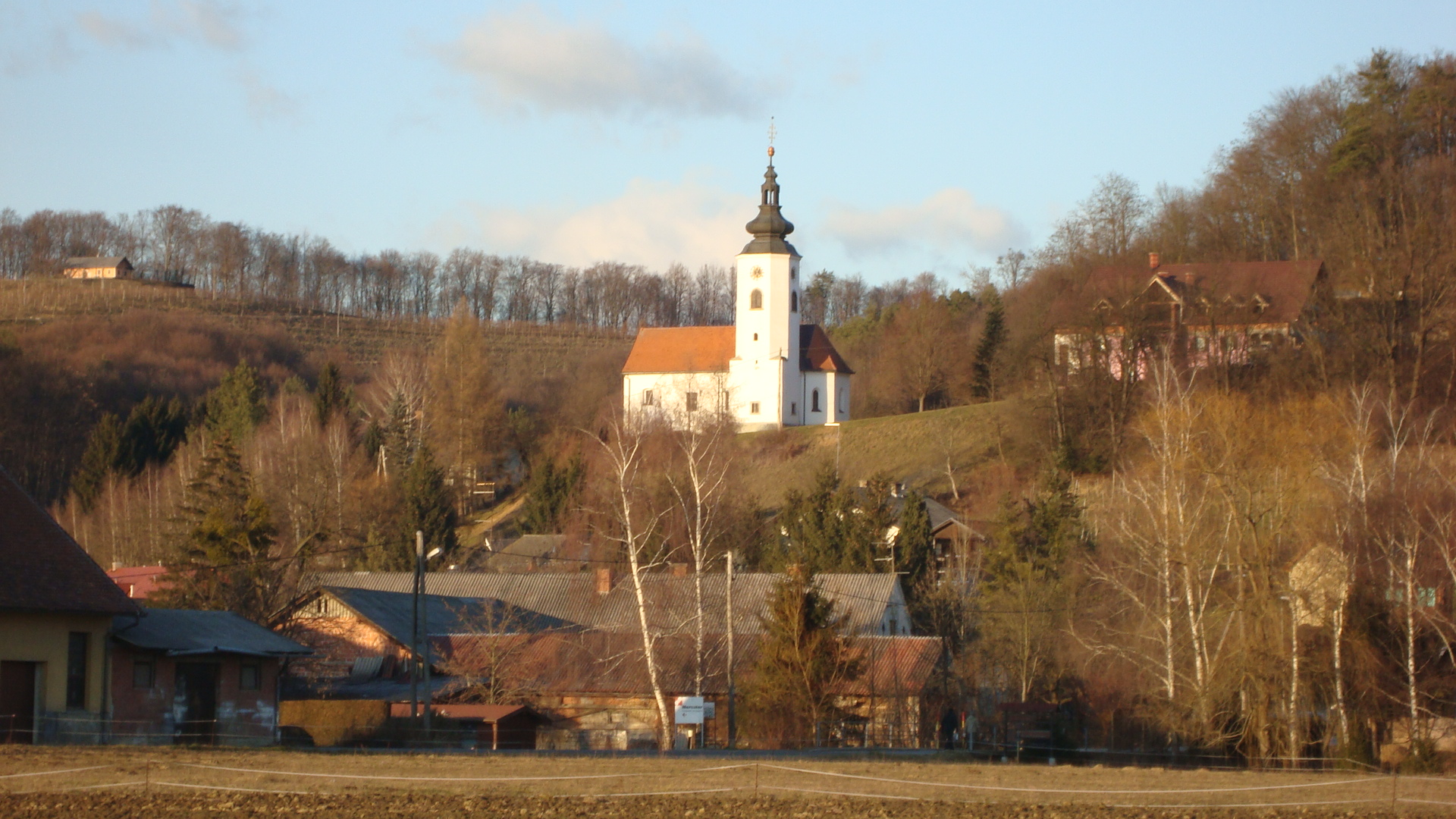

- Location in Slovenia
- Coordinates: 46°25′27.52″N 16°3′9.71″E
- Country: Slovenia
- Traditional region: Styria
- Statistical region: Drava
- Municipality: Ormož

Area
  - Total: 2.96 km^{2} (1.14 sq mi)
- Elevation: 210.1 m (689 ft)

Population (2002)
  - Total: 519

Podgorci (pronounced [pɔdˈɡoːɾtsi], German: Podgorzen) is a village west of Velika Nedelja in the Municipality of Ormož in northeastern Slovenia. The area is part of the traditional region of Styria and is now included in the Drava Statistical Region.

The local parish church is built on a small hill above the settlement and is dedicated to Saint Leonard. It belongs to the Roman Catholic Archdiocese of Maribor. It was built in 1519 and was vaulted in the late 18th century.
