= Velika Nedelja =

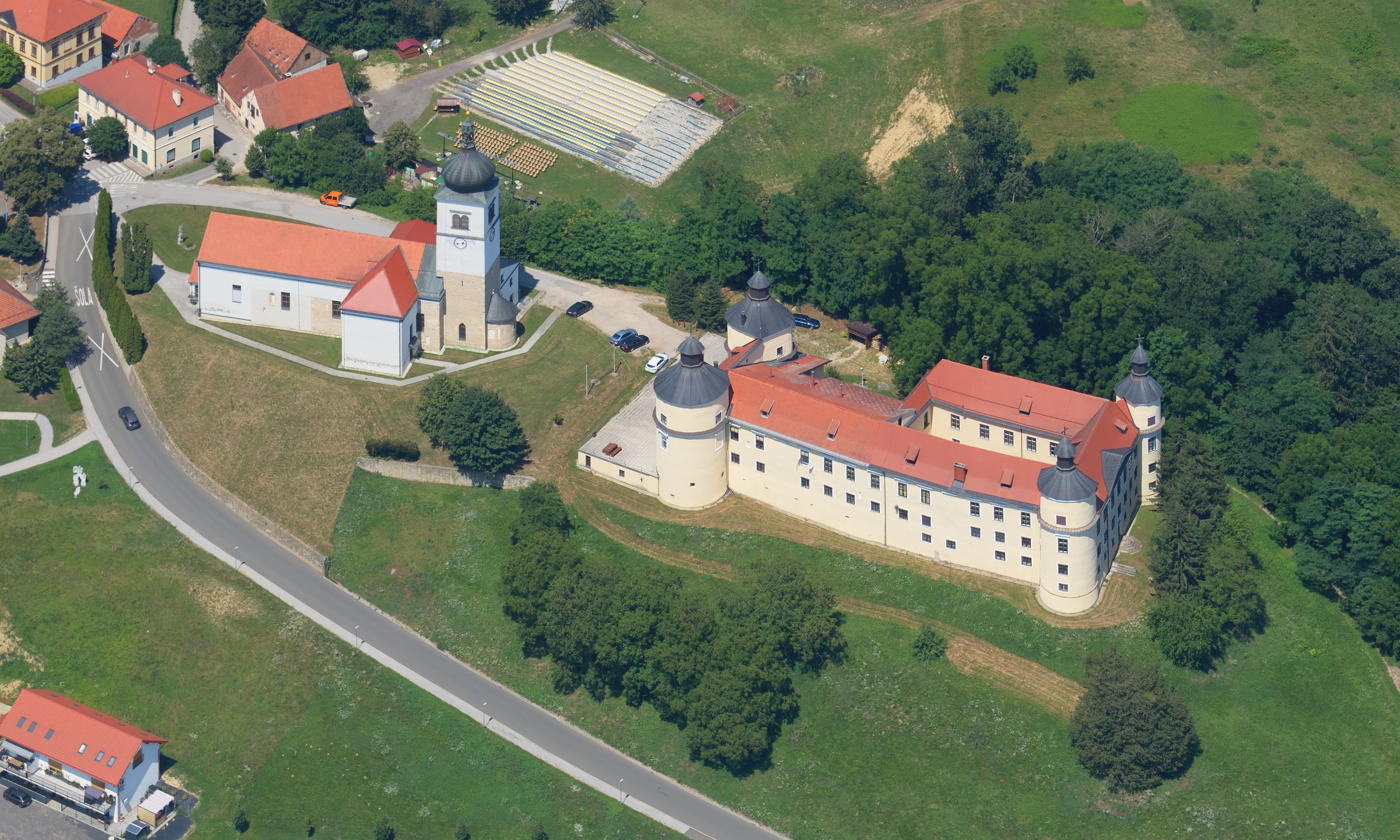

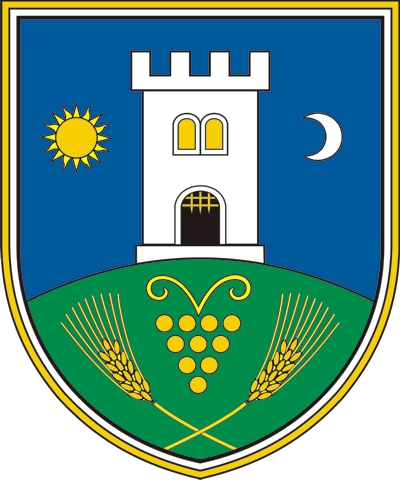
- Coat of arms

- Location in Slovenia
- Coordinates: 46°25′25.81″N 16°6′57.54″E
- Country: Slovenia
- Traditional region: Styria
- Statistical region: Drava
- Municipality: Ormož

Area
  - Total: 1.57 km^{2} (0.61 sq mi)
- Elevation: 270.7 m (888 ft)

Population (2002)
  - Total: 301

Velika Nedelja (pronounced [ˈʋeːlika ˈneːdɛlja]) is a settlement in the Municipality of Ormož in northeastern Slovenia. The area traditionally belonged to the region of Styria. It is now included in the Drava Statistical Region.

It is dominated by Velika Nedelja Castle and the neighbouring parish church. The castle originates in the 13th century and was rebuilt and expanded in the 17th and 18th centuries and renovated in 1989. It has an internal courtyard with a well and rounded turrets on the corners of the two-storey main building. It houses the local archive and a small museum. The church next to it is dedicated to the Holy Trinity and belongs to the Roman Catholic Archdiocese of Maribor. It is an originally Romanesque single-naved building with a belfry and 18th-century Baroque additions. Some Romanesque sculpture is preserved on the facade and the interior of the church.
