= Ormož =

- Town
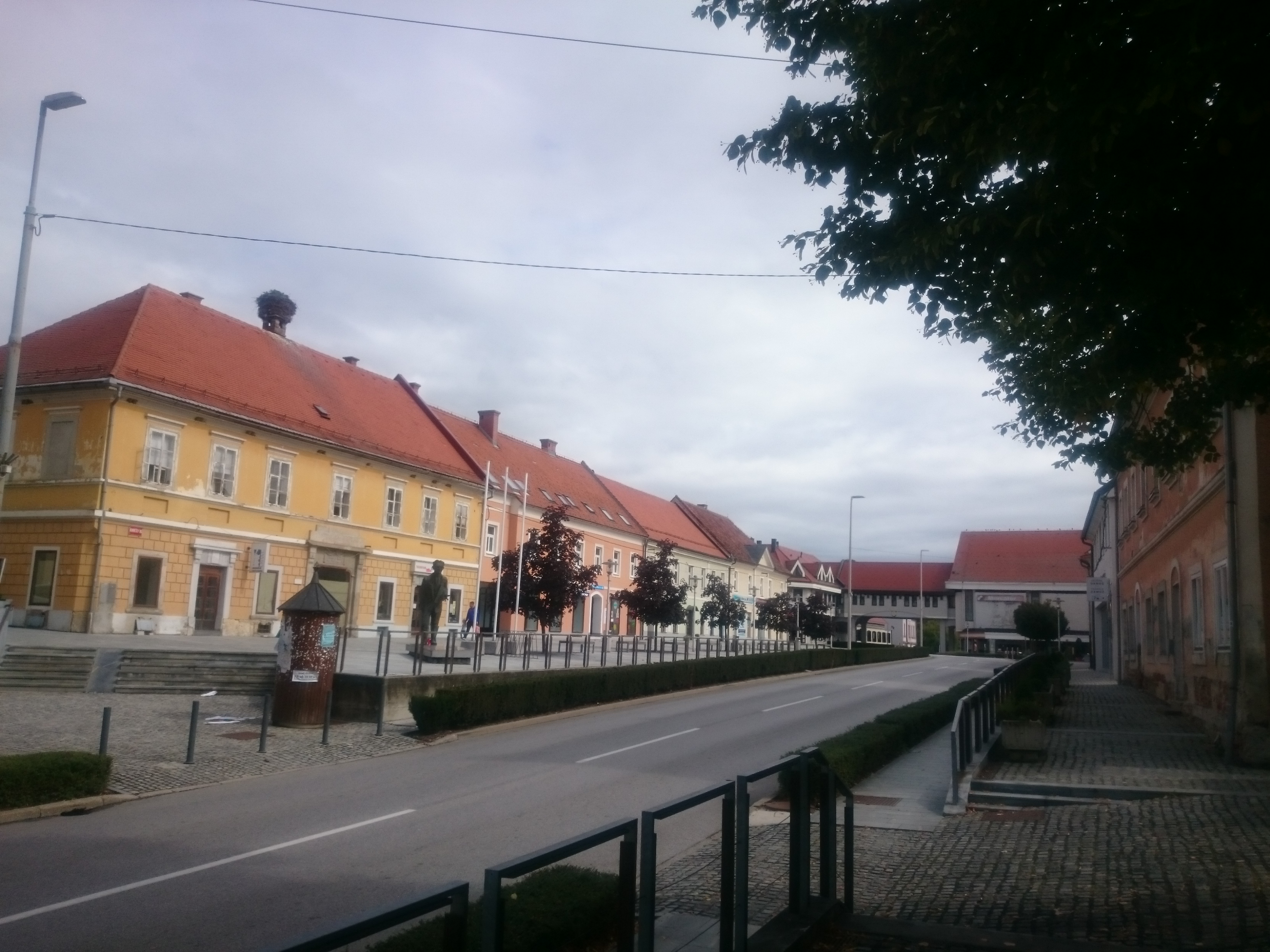
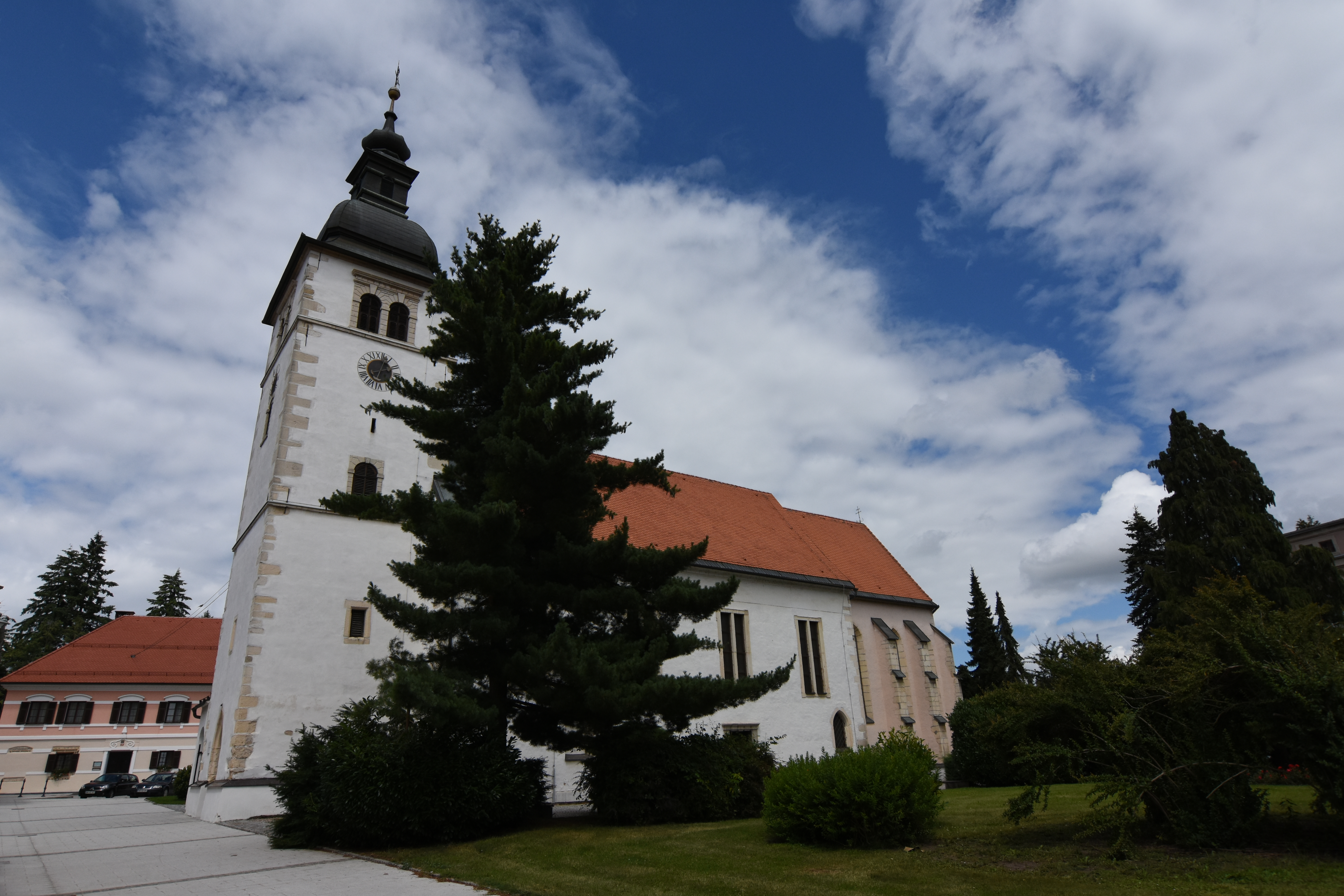
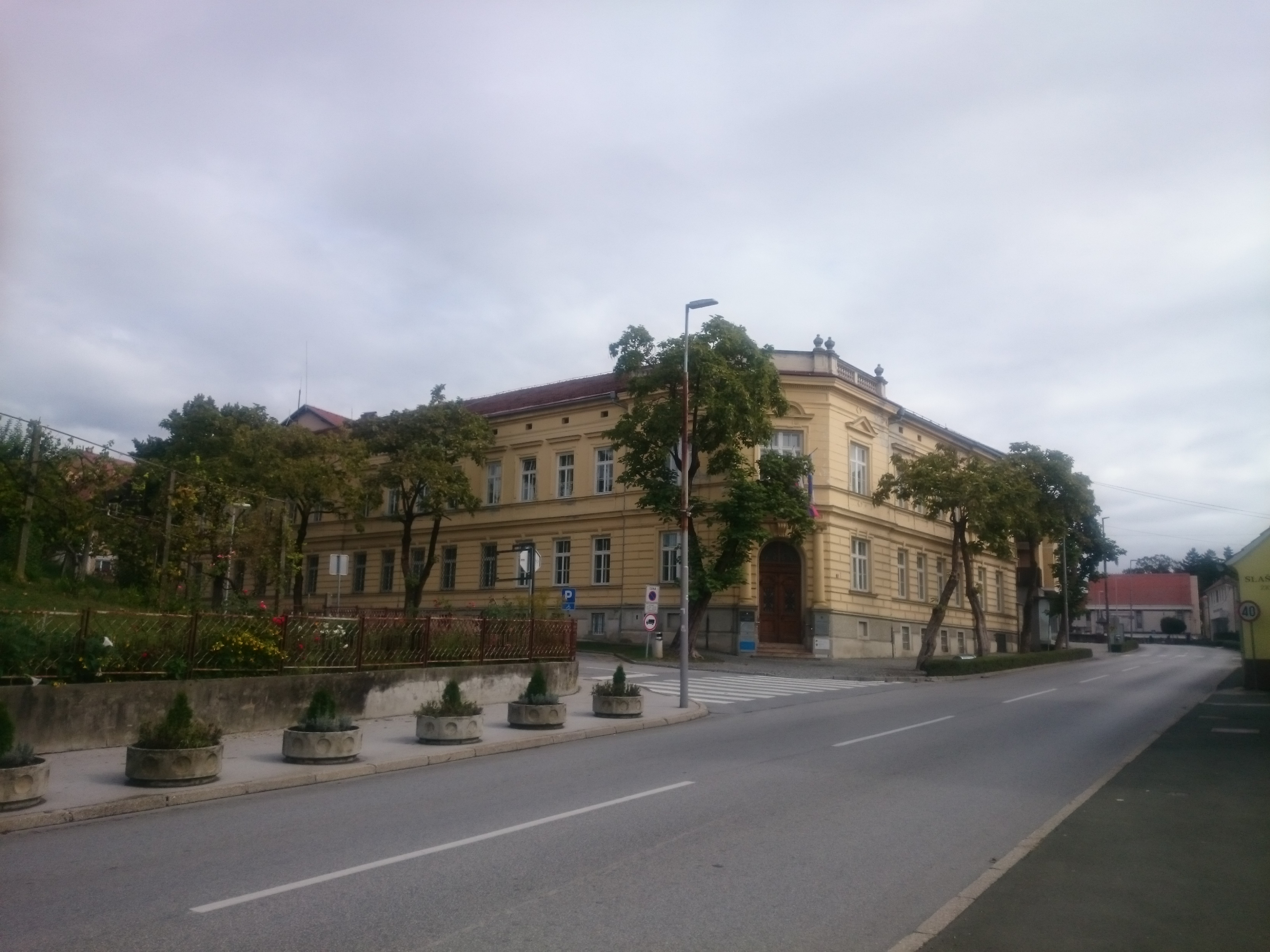
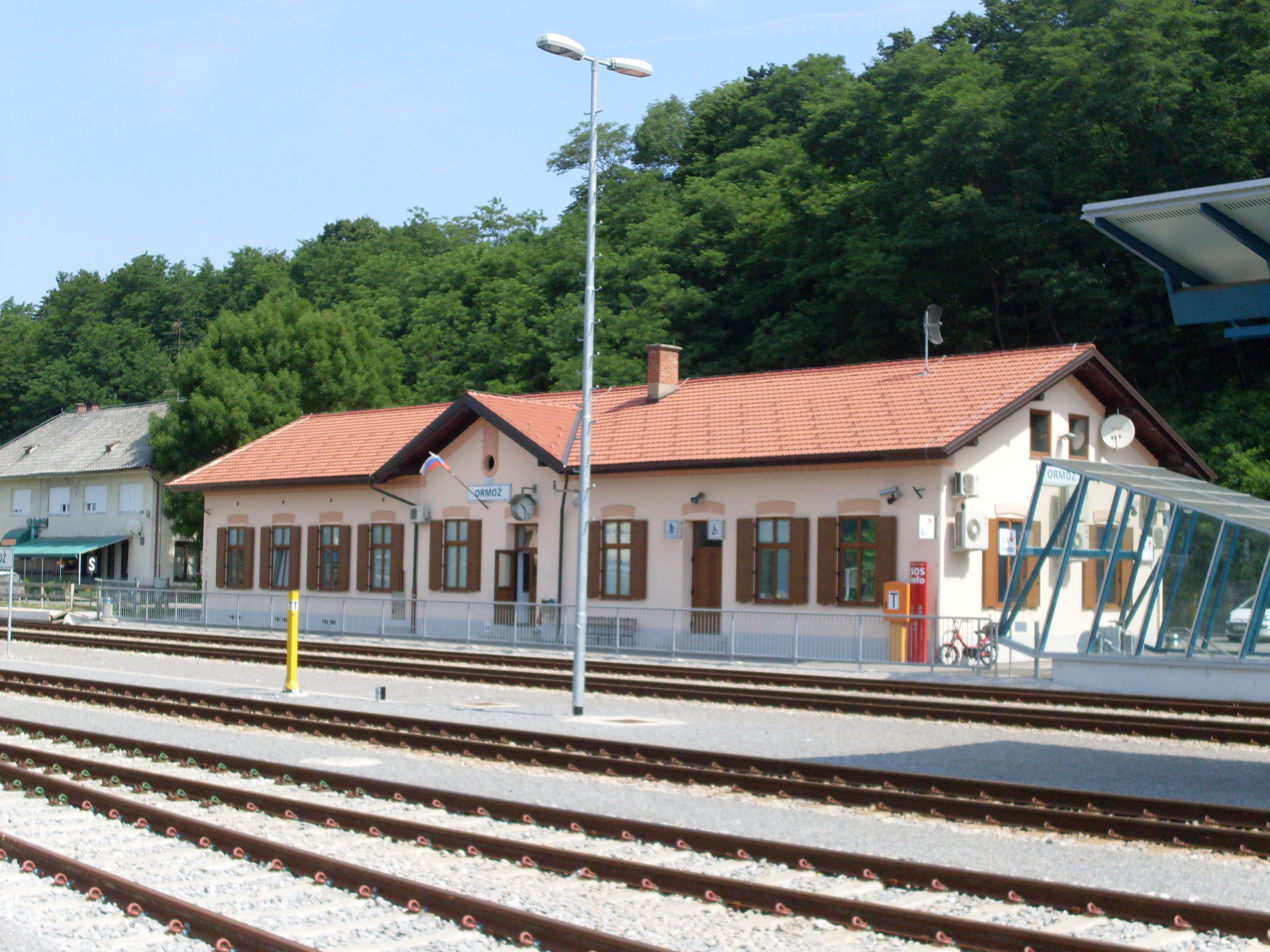
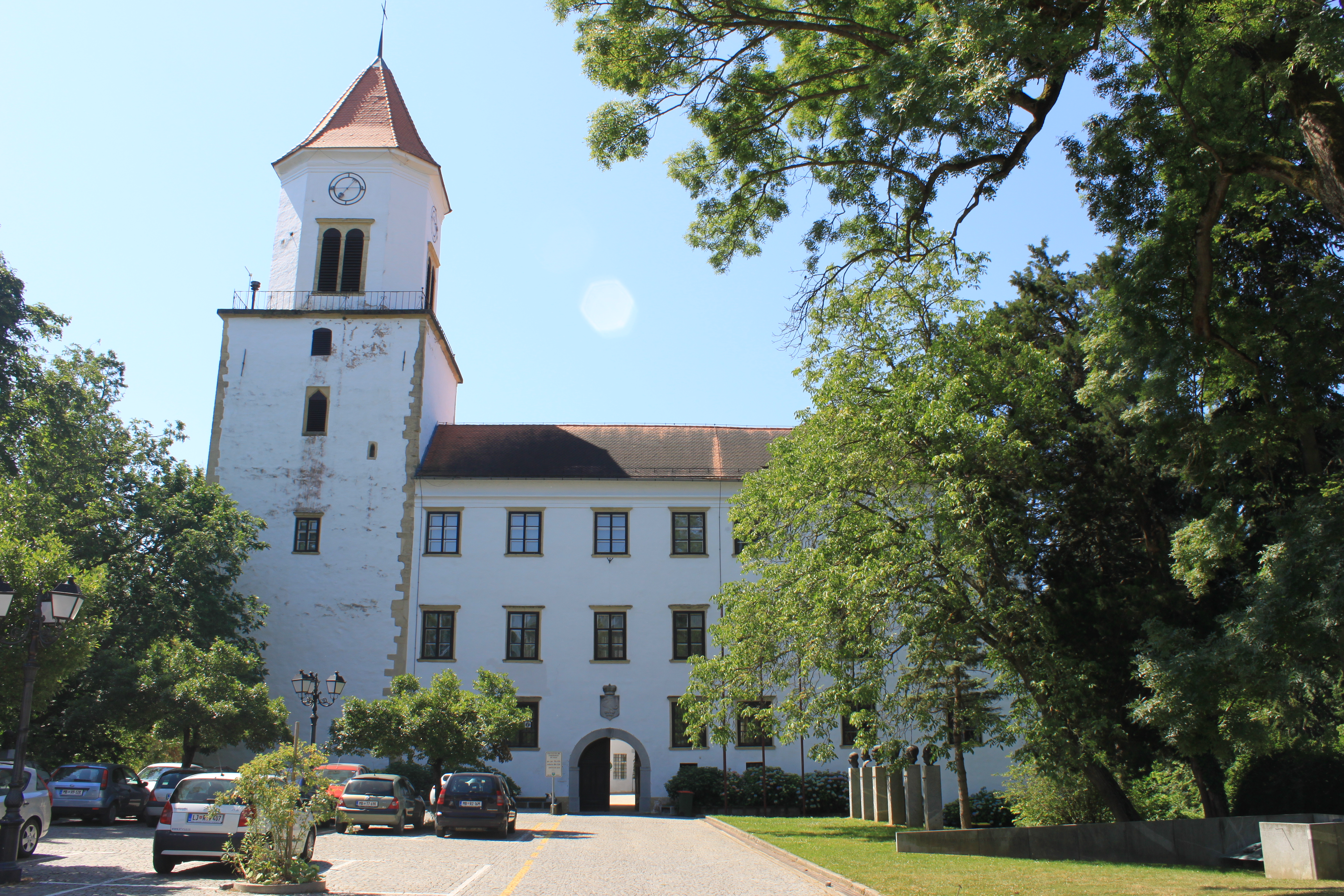
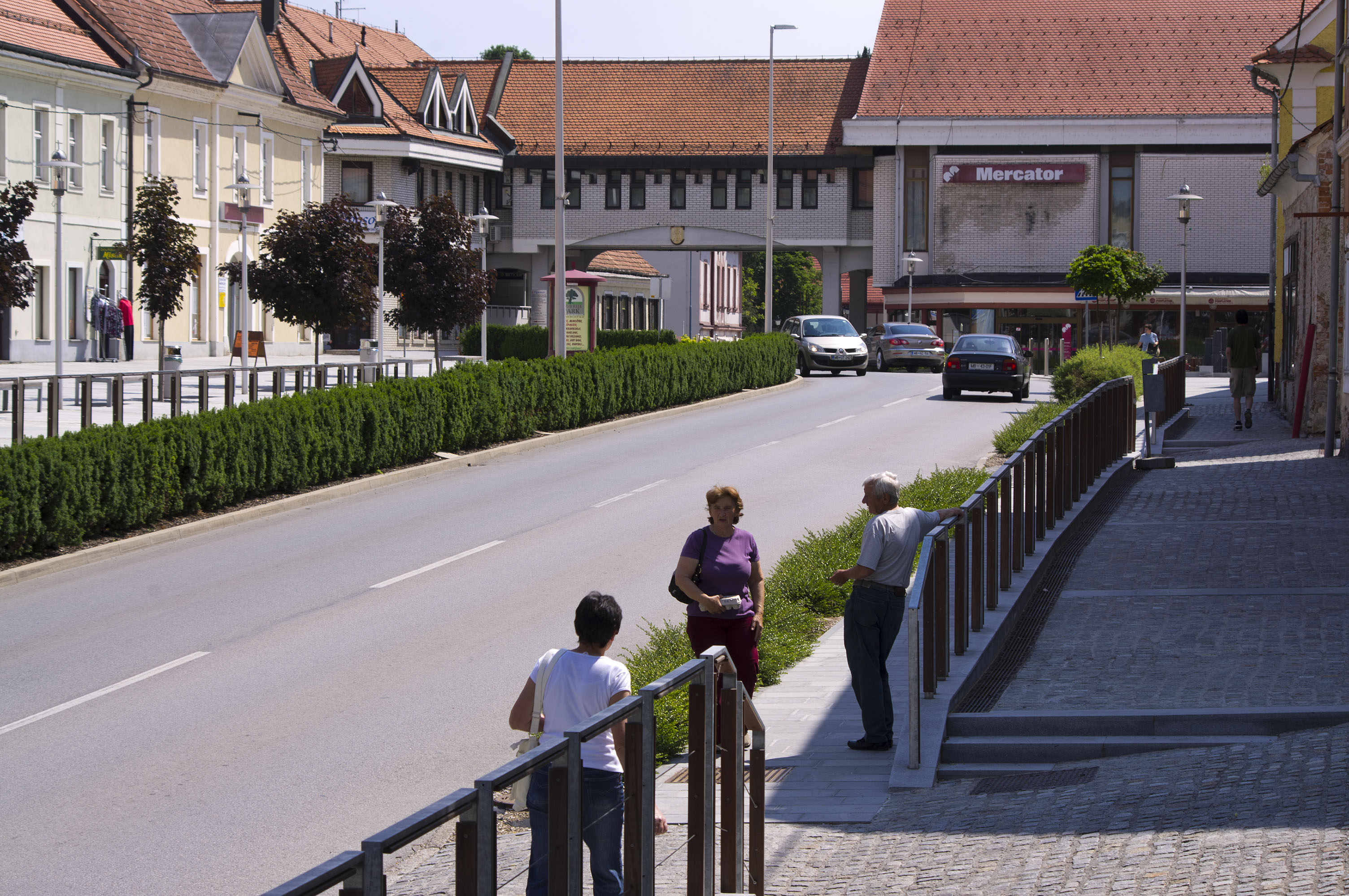
- From top, left to right: Kerenčič Square, St. Jacob's Church, Town Hall, Railway Station, Ormož Castle, Town center

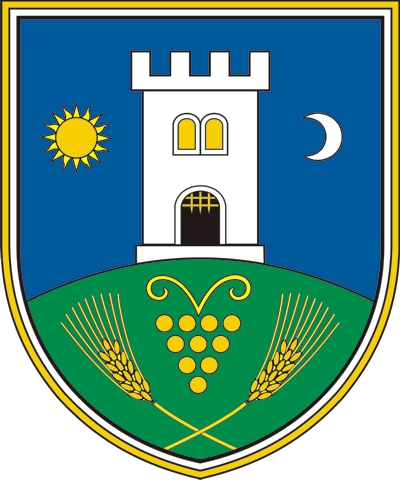
- Coat of arms

- Location of Ormož in Slovenia
- Coordinates: 46°24′31″N 16°08′51″E
- Country: Slovenia
- Traditional region: Styria
- Statistical region: Drava
- Municipality: Ormož

Area
  - Total: 3.9 km^{2} (1.5 sq mi)

Population (2026)
  - Total: 1,956
- Time zone: UTC+01 (CET)
  - Summer (DST): UTC+02 (CEST)
- Vehicle registration: MB
- Climate: Cfb

Ormož (pronounced [ˈóːɾmɔʃ]; in older sources Ormuš, Hungarian: Ormosd, German: Friedau, Prekmurje Slovene: Ormošd) is a town in the traditional region of Prlekija, part of Styria, in northeastern Slovenia. It lies on the left bank of the Drava River and borders with Croatia on the opposite bank of the river. It is the administrative seat of the Municipality of Ormož.

== Name ==
Ormož was attested in written records in 1273 as Holermůs (and as Holrmues in 1299 and Holrmůs in 1320). The name is based on the Latinized name Alramus, borrowed from Germanic Alram (< *Aþala-hraban, literally 'noble ravan'). The person designated by the name is uncertain, but a possible namesake is Salzburg Bishop A(da)lram (reigned 821–836) because the Ormož area became the property of the Archbishopric of Salzburg in the ninth century.

== History ==
The settlement received market rights in 1293 and town rights in 1331, and it was predominantly known under its German name, Friedau. Until 1919, the population was predominantly German; the census of 1900 mentioned 892 inhabitants, with German as the predominant spoken language (593) followed by Slovenian (227).

== Church ==
Historical population
Year	Pop.	±%
1948	1,036	—
1953	1,220	+17.8%
1961	1,368	+12.1%
1971	1,566	+14.5%
1981	2,097	+33.9%
1991	2,303	+9.8%
2002	2,210	−4.0%
2011	2,174	−1.6%
2021	1,862	−14.4%
Population size may be affected by changes in administrative divisions.

The parish church in the town is dedicated to Saint James. It was first mentioned in written sources dated to 1271. It was rebuilt on a number of occasions in the 16th, 17th, and 18th centuries. It contains frescos from the 14th and 17th centuries.

== Geography ==
Just outside Ormož to the southeast and named after the town is Lake Ormož, a reservoir on the Drava River. The Ormož Lagoons, a nature reserve, are located next to the reservoir. The Ormož Lagoons consist of six former retention basins that originally served a sugar refinery in Ormož and were transformed into a marsh after the sugar refinery ceased operations. The area around Lake Ormož and the Ormož Lagoons is an important habitat for birds, including some endangered species of migratory birds. The landscape north of Ormož is hilly, with many forests and vineyards. The Lešnica River empties into the Drava just west of Ormož, and Pavlovci Creek (Slovene: Pavlovski potok) flows to the east of the town.

== Notable natives and residents ==
- Ivan Geršak (1838–1911), notary public, president of several local societies, national awakener, politician, writer, and advocate of Slovene
- Ruda Jurčec (1905–1975), writer, journalist, editor, clerical political activist
- Anton Krempl (1790–1844), historian, writer, poet
- Antun Vramec (1538–1587/8), historian, writer
- Countess Maria Irma Wurmbrand-Georgievich (1886–1970), last owner of Ormož Castle
- Baron Guido Georgievich
- Marko Bezjak, handball player
- Aleksander Vavpotič (1873–1916), monk and choirmaster
- Bojan Polak (1918–2004), athlete and communist politician

== See also ==
- Illyrian amber figures
