= List of Slovenian politicians =

The following is a list of Slovenian politicians:

== A ==
- Juro Adlešič
- Fran Albreht

== B ==
- Andrej Bajuk
- Engelbert Besednjak
- Janez Bleiweis
- Katja Boh
- József Borovnyák
- France Bučar

== C ==
- Ivan Cankar

== D ==
- Stane Dolanc

== E ==
- Andrej Einspieler
- Josip Ferfolja

== G ==
- Andrej Gosar

== H ==
- Ivan Hribar

== J ==
- Zoran Janković
- Janez Janša
- Iztok Jarc
- Zmago Jelinčič Plemeniti
- Romana Jordan Cizelj
- Aurelio Juri

== K ==
- Franc Kangler
- Edvard Kardelj
- Stane Kavčič
- Franci Kek
- Boris Kidrič
- Roman Kirn
- József Klekl
- Anton Korošec
- Sergej Kraigher
- Janez Evangelist Krek
- Miha Krek
- Etbin Kristan
- Milan Kučan

== L ==
- Karel Lavrič
- Dragotin Lončar

== M ==
- Matija Majar
- Drago Marušič
- Tomaž Marušič

== N ==
- Marko Natlačen
- Anton Novačan
- Ljudmila Novak

== P ==
- Borut Pahor
- Lojze Peterle
- Janez Podobnik
- Janez Potočnik
- Albin Prepeluh
- Janko Prunk
- Jože Pučnik

== R ==
- Ciril Ribičič
- Mitja Ribičič
- Anton Rop
- Dimitrij Rupel

== S ==
- József Szakovics
- Ljubo Sirc
- Franc Snoj

== Š ==
- Matjaž Šinkovec
- Jožef Školč
- Lovro Šturm
- Ivan Šušteršič

== T ==
- Ivan Tavčar
- Vilmos Tkálecz

== V ==
- Ivo Vajgl
- Josip Vilfan
- Bogomil Vošnjak
- Josip Vošnjak
- Anton Vratuša

== Z ==
- Jure Zupan
- Milan Zver

== Ž ==
- Gregor Žerjal
