= Old Slovenes =

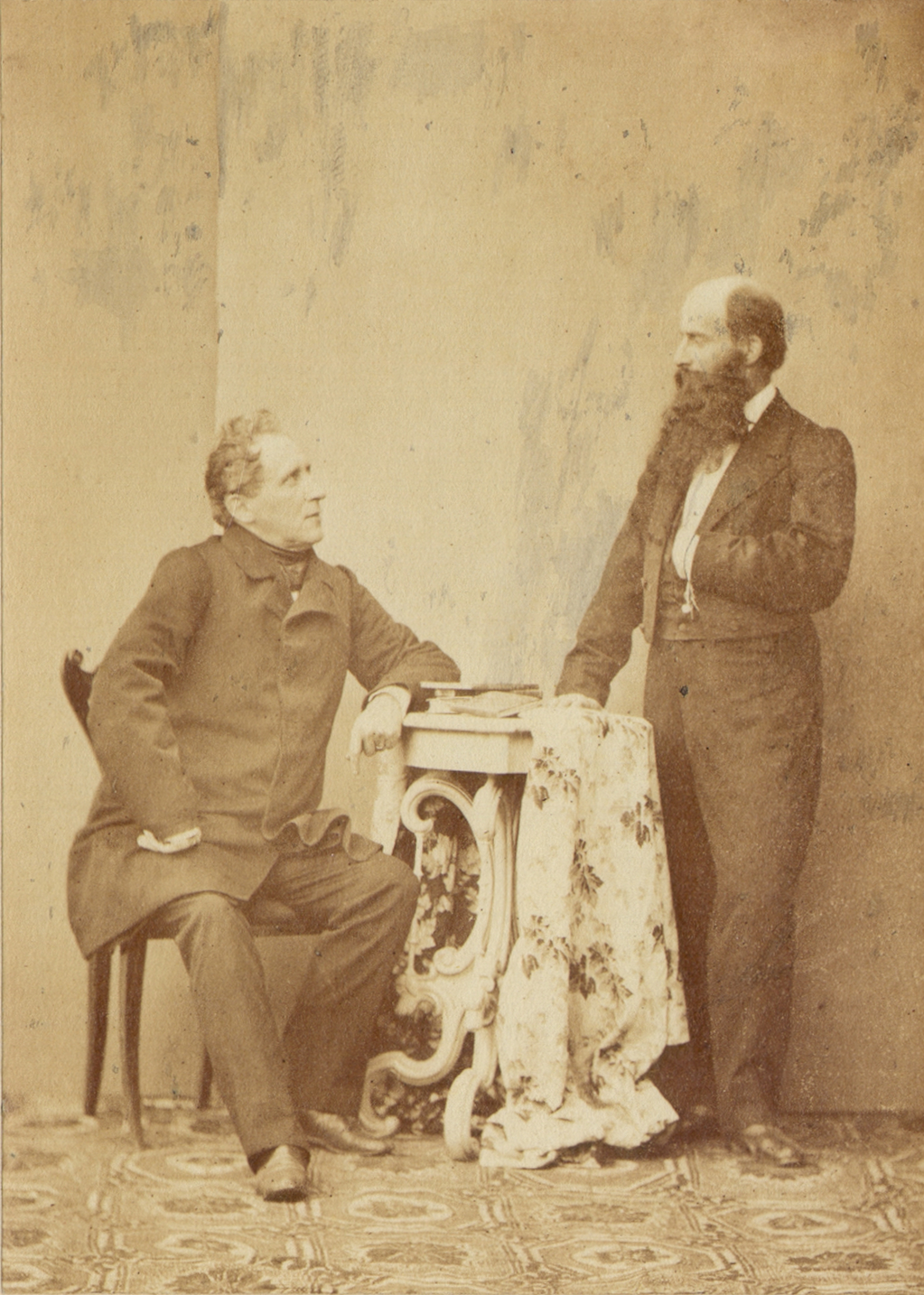
Old Slovene leaders Janez Bleiweis and Lovro Toman in the late 1860s.

Old Slovenes (Slovene: Staroslovenci) is a term used for a national conservative political group in the Slovene Lands from the 1850s to the 1870s, which opposed the radical national liberal Young Slovenes. The main Old Slovene leaders were Janez Bleiweis, Lovro Toman, Luka Svetec, Etbin Henrik Costa, and Andrej Einspieler.

== Origin ==
In the 1860s, the Slovene National Movement, which had a wide political platform, based on national emancipation of Slovenes in the Austrian Empire, and the recognition of the linguistic rights of the Slovene language, split into different factions. The differences were both ideological and tactical.

After the beginning of the constitutional period in the Austrian Empire, the Slovene nationalists gathered around the moderate conservative and liberal Catholic editor of the newspaper Kmetijske in rokodelske novice, Janez Bleiweis. Bleiweis and his allies led a policy of tactical alliances with different power groups in the Austrian Empire, like the Roman Catholic Church, František Palacký's Czech federalists, and a small part of the Carniolan regionalist landed nobility. From the mid-1860s onwards, a group of young nationalist activists and intellectuals, gathered around Fran Levstik and Josip Stritar, challenged this pragmatic policy, demanding a more radical approach which would fully embrace liberal ideas. After a decade of friction between the two factions, the break came in 1872, when the Young Slovenes established their own political organization. Consequently, the group remaining loyal to the old leadership and the traditional policies, became known as Old Slovenes.

Contrary to the Young Slovenes, who were critical of the Catholic hierarchy, the Old Slovenes promoted traditional values, such as family, religion, and loyalty to the Habsburg dynasty, on an Austroslavist background. Their motto was "All [things] for Faith, Home, and Emperor!" (Vse za vero, dom, cesarja!).

== Demise ==
By 1876, the two factions had forged a tactical alliance against Austrian centralism and German nationalism, and both supported the Taaffe government. This tactical alliance between conservatives and liberals, which also included a substantial group of radicals, was known as "The Concord" (Slovene: Slogaštvo). In the mid-1880s, the Concord came under sharp criticism from the new generation of Catholic activists, led by the theologian Anton Mahnič, and sponsored by part of the Roman Catholic establishment (especially the Cardinal Jakob Missia). The Old Slovenes opposed this new trend of political Catholicism, which was able to mobilize the peasant masses, and continued to support a more traditional understanding of politics.

With the death of most of the Old Slovene leaders in the 1880s, the Slovene conservative political movement was replaced by a new type of political conservatism, based initially on traditionalist political Catholicism and later on Christian Social and Christian Socialist ideas. The establishment of the Catholic National Party in 1892 marked the end of the policy of "Concord", based on an alliance between Old Slovenes and Young Slovenes. Instead, two opposing political movements emerged, the "Clericals" and the "Liberals". Many of the surviving Old Slovene leaders, like Luka Svetec, preferred to join the National Liberals.

== Personalities ==
The most important exponents of the Old Slovene political current were:

- Janez Bleiweis
- Lovro Toman
- Andrej Einspieler
- Etbin Henrik Costa
- Luka Svetec
- Janez Vesel
- Davorin Trstenjak
- Peter Kosler
