= Josip Vošnjak =

Slovene politician and author

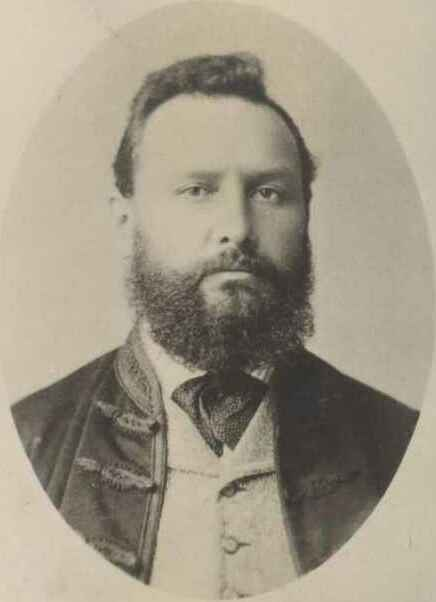
Josip Vošnjak in the 1870s

Josip Vošnjak (4 January 1834 – 21 October 1911) was a Slovene politician and author, leader of the Slovene National Movement in the Duchy of Styria, one of the most prominent representatives of the Young Slovene movement.

He was born in a wealthy merchant family in the Lower Styrian town of Šoštanj, then part of the Austrian Empire. His father was a wealthy leather manufacturer and landowner. Josip grew up in a nationally indifferentiated environment; although his mother tongue was German, he was fluent in Slovene since childhood. He attended the prestigious First Celje Grammar School, where he became involved in the Slovene national revival. He continued his high school studies in Graz and in Vienna. He studied medicine at the University of Vienna. After graduation in 1858, he practiced as a physician in his hometown for one year, and then in Ljubljana, Kranj, Slovenska Bistrica, Šmarje pri Jelšah, before finally settling in Ljubljana in 1872.

He entered politics in Kranj, under the influence of the national conservative leader Janez Bleiweis. He published several articles in Bleiweis'es journal Kmetijske in rokodelske novice. Upon returning to Styria in 1861, he became the leader of the Slovene National Movement in the Duchy of Styria. He was a fervent supporter of the idea of a United Slovenia, and was, together with Karel Lavrič, the crucial organizer of a series of mass rallies organized between 1867 and 1871 in support of the unification of Slovene Lands into one autonomous political-administrative entity. These rallies, known as the Tabori movement, which were modelled on Daniel O'Connell's monster meetings.

In 1867, Vošnjak was elected to the Styrian Provincial Diet, where he remained until 1878. During this time, he became one of the most radical members of the national liberal Young Slovene party. In 1868, he co-founded the newspaper Slovenski narod, which became the herald of Slovene liberalism until the dissolution of the Austro-Hungarian Empire. Between 1873 and 1885, he served as member of the Austrian Parliament.

After the death of his closest collaborator Josip Jurčič in 1881, Vošnjak's influence started to decline. He served as member of the Carniolan Provincial Diet until 1895, but his political activity was overshadowed by a new, much more radical generation of Slovene liberal politicians, such as Janko Kersnik, Ivan Hribar, Ivan Tavčar and Fran Šuklje.

Vošnjak was also a prolific author; he wrote many political articles and essays, as well as plays and short stories. He was a proponent of cooperatives both in banking and production. He was interested in spiritism, which he saw as a counterbalance to "soul-less capitalism". He was also a radical Anti-semite and one of the first theorists of racial antisemitism in the Slovene Lands.

He retired from public life in 1895, and moved to his estate Visole near Slovenska Bistrica, where he died in 1911.

Vošnjak wrote many articles on economic and political issues in progressive and nationalist journals such as Ljubljanski Zvon and Slovenski Narod; he also wrote on issues of agrarian production, and more practical issues, such as medical advises.

Josip Vošnjak was the brother of the national liberal activist Mihael Vošnjak, the pioneer of cooperative banking in present-day Slovenia, and the uncle of the Yugoslav politician, diplomat and historian Bogumil Vošnjak.
