= Luka Svetec =

Slovene politician and lawyer (1826–1921)

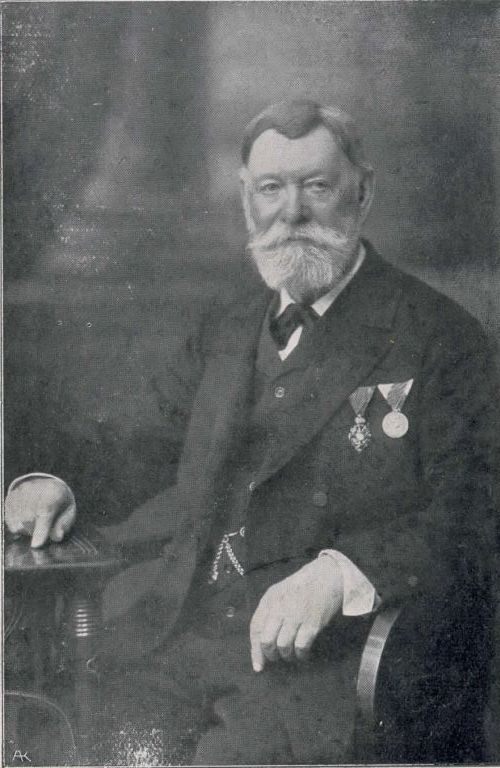
Luka Svetec

Luka Svetec (8 October 1826 – 28 January 1921) was a Slovene politician, lawyer, author and philologist. In the 1870s and 1880s, Svetec was one of the most influential leaders of the so-called Old Slovenes, a national conservative political group in 19th century Slovene Lands. He was renowned as an honest and principled politician, and was praised for his decency and his straightforward, practical attitude to political questions and life in general. The Old Slovene leader Janez Bleiweis called him "a crystallized Slovene common sense". Because of his failure to take over the political leadership of the party after the death of its leader Janez Bleiweis, also called Father of the Nation, Svetec was mockingly referred in the press to as "Stepfather of the Nation".

== Life and career ==
Svetec was born in the Upper Carniolan village of Podgorje near Kamnik, in what was then the Austrian Empire (now in Slovenia). After finishing the grammar school in Ljubljana, he enrolled at the University of Vienna, where he studied law. After graduation in 1853, he worked in the Austrian administration in Croatia. After 1861, he returned to his native Carniola, at first as a senior official in the Austrian judicial administration in Mokronog and Kočevje, and subsequently as a district judge in Brdo. Between 1866 and 1871, he worked in the municipal administration in Ljubljana, and later as a civil law notary in Idrija and Litija.

He participated in the Slovene national movement since 1848. He was very active in the discussions on the creation of a literary standard for the Slovene language. He was one of the most vocal defendants of Slovene linguistic and national individuality against pan-Slavism and Yugoslavism. He entered active politics in 1862, when he was elected to the provincial diet of Carniola. In the 1870s, especially after the death of Lovro Toman, he emerged as one of the most influential leaders of the Old Slovene political movement. Against the pragmatism of most of its leaders, Svetec called for an intransigent political action, thus frequently siding with the radical Young Slovenes. Throughout his life, he defended the idea of United Slovenia. He opposed national demands based on historical state rights, and firmly supported the idea of natural right of peoples.

After 1881, he was designated as the successor of Janez Bleiweis as the leader of the Old Slovene movement. However, his leadership was rejected by the more conservative factions in the movement. After the mid-1880s, Svetec grew closer to the Slovene liberal nationalists, and finally joined the National Progressive Party.

He died at the age of 94 in Litija.
