= Young Slovenes =

Slovene national liberal political movement

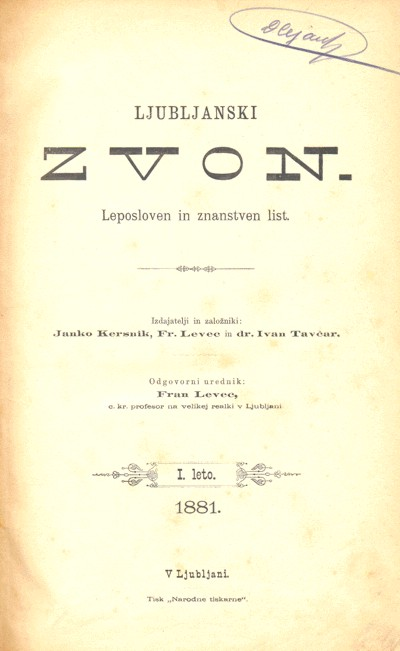
The cover of the first issue of the journal Ljubljanski zvon, established by Young Slovene followers.

Young Slovenes (Slovene: Mladoslovenci) were a Slovene national liberal political movement in the 1860s and 1870s, inspired and named after the Young Czechs in Bohemia and Moravia. They were opposed to the national conservative Old Slovenes. They entered a crisis in the 1880s, and disappeared from Slovene politics by the 1890s. They are considered the precursors of Liberalism in Slovenia.

== Historical background ==
The movement was founded in the early 1860s, when a group of young Slovene radicals, led by the author and activist Fran Levstik, challenged the influence of the conservative leadership of the Slovene National Movement which was led by the so-called triumvirate of Janez Bleiweis, Lovro Toman and Etbin Henrik Costa. Levstik and his peers rejected the pragmatic tactics of the conservative mainstream of Slovene nationalists, and demanded more decisive political actions, which would include a direct confrontation with the Austrian authorities in the form of mass mobilizations of the Slovene pesantry. Levstik's demands were backed mostly by the Slovenes from Styria and the Austrian Littoral, while the Slovenes from Carniola and Carinthia remained mostly on the side of their conservative leadership. By the mid-1860s, two distinct factions within the Slovene National Movement emerged: the liberal and radical Young Slovenes and the national conservative Old Slovenes. The two groups collaborated closely until 1872, and broke up. In 1876, they forged a fragile tactical alliance against Austrian centralism and German nationalism, and united in support of the coalition government of Eduard Taaffe.

== Rise and decline ==
The importance of the Young Slovenes rose after 1867, when they criticized sharply the inconsistent policy of the Slovene conservative leadership, especially of their support for the Austro-Hungarian compromise in the Austrian Parliament. As a response to what they considered inefficient "cabinet politics", the Young Slovenes organized mass popular rallies in support of the United Slovenia program, modelled after of Daniel O'Connell's monster meetings. These rallies, held between 1868 and 1871, proved to be very successful for the mass mobilization of the peasantry for the Slovene national cause, although they did not have any consequence in the Austrian policy toward the Slovene national question.

The Young Slovenes sought to get rid of the Roman Catholic Church's influence. Although they supported a laicist and secularist view, they tried to avoid direct confrontation with Roman Catholisim; several liberal Catholic priests, such as the poet Simon Gregorčič, were also sympathetic to the Young Slovene movement.

After a period of sharp political struggle between the Young and Old Slovenes in the early 1870s, a compromise between them was reached in 1876. However, both factions maintained their own political infrastructure, including their own media. The Young Slovenes issued the newspaper Slovenski narod, founded in Maribor in 1868, and controlled the editorial policy of the cultural magazine Ljubljanski zvon.

After the 1880s, with the death of Fran Levstik and Josip Jurčič, the Young Slovene movement slowly declined. Its legacy was however taken over by younger generations of Slovene liberals who founded, after the final break in the Slovene National Movement in the late 1880s, the Slovene National Progressive Party.

== Radicals vs. Elastics ==
In the Carniolan regional elections of 1883, the Slovene nationalists gained a landslide victory over the mostly German speaking Austrian centralists. Following that victory, ideological differences within the Slovene national movement rose again. It started as a differentiation between the moderate Young Slovene faction, represented by Fran Šuklje and Janko Kersnik, and their radical liberal nationalist opponents, led by Ivan Hribar and Ivan Tavčar. The moderates became known by the derogative name "elastics".

The strife between the two faction reached its height between 1886 and 1887, when the Young Slovene newspaper Slovenski narod, controlled by the radicals, started publishing a series of articles with a pronounced Pan-Slavic and Anti-Catholic content, written by the controversial pro-Russian nationalist publicist Davorin Hostnik. The radical turn in the editorial policies of the liberal press provoked a fierce reaction in some Catholic circles, and was one of the elements that contributed to the rise of the Kulturkampf in the Slovene Lands in the mid-1880s.

== The "Division of Minds" and the rise of mass politics ==
In the mid-1880s, several influential Roman Catholic groups, rallied around the Bishop of Ljubljana Jakob Missia (later Archbishop of Gorizia) and the theologian Anton Mahnič, launched an attack on modernism in the Slovene Lands. Mahnič's circle called for a "division of minds" or "division of souls" (Slovene: ločitev duhov), that is a clear-cut political and ideological differentiation between the Catholics and the secularists. As a consequence, the Slovene political scene was largely re-configured along the divide between clericalism and anti-clericalism. The New Slovenes, with their mixture of agnosticism and liberal Catholicism, did not fit this new differentiation, and were replaced by the more radical Progressive nationalists (also known as Liberals).

Besides, the old model of politics, based on small elites, was gradually being replaced by an emerging mass politics, characterized by the Christian Socialism of Janez Evangelist Krek on one side, and on the radicalised liberal nationalism of Ivan Hribar and Ivan Tavčar on the other side. By the mid-1890s, the Marxists, gathered in the Yugoslav Social Democratic Party also appeared on the scene.

In this changed configuration, the Young Slovenes vanished from the political scene by the 1890s. The radical Young Slovene faction formed the core of the new National Progressive Party, while some moderates chose the Slovene People's Party instead.

== Personalities ==
Important Young Slovene leaders and activists included:

- Fran Levstik
- Josip Jurčič
- Karel Lavrič
- Josip Vošnjak
- Mihael Vošnjak
- Josip Stritar
- Valentin Zarnik
- Simon Jenko
- Janko Kersnik
- Fran Erjavec
- Fran Levec
- Fran Šuklje
- Anton Tomšič

== Sources ==
- Ivan Prijatelj, Slovenska kulturnopolitična in slovstvena zgodovina, 1848-1895, Vol. III: Mladoslovenci (Ljubljana: Državna založba Slovenije, 1958).
