= Anton Füster =

Austrian Roman Catholic priest (1808–1881)

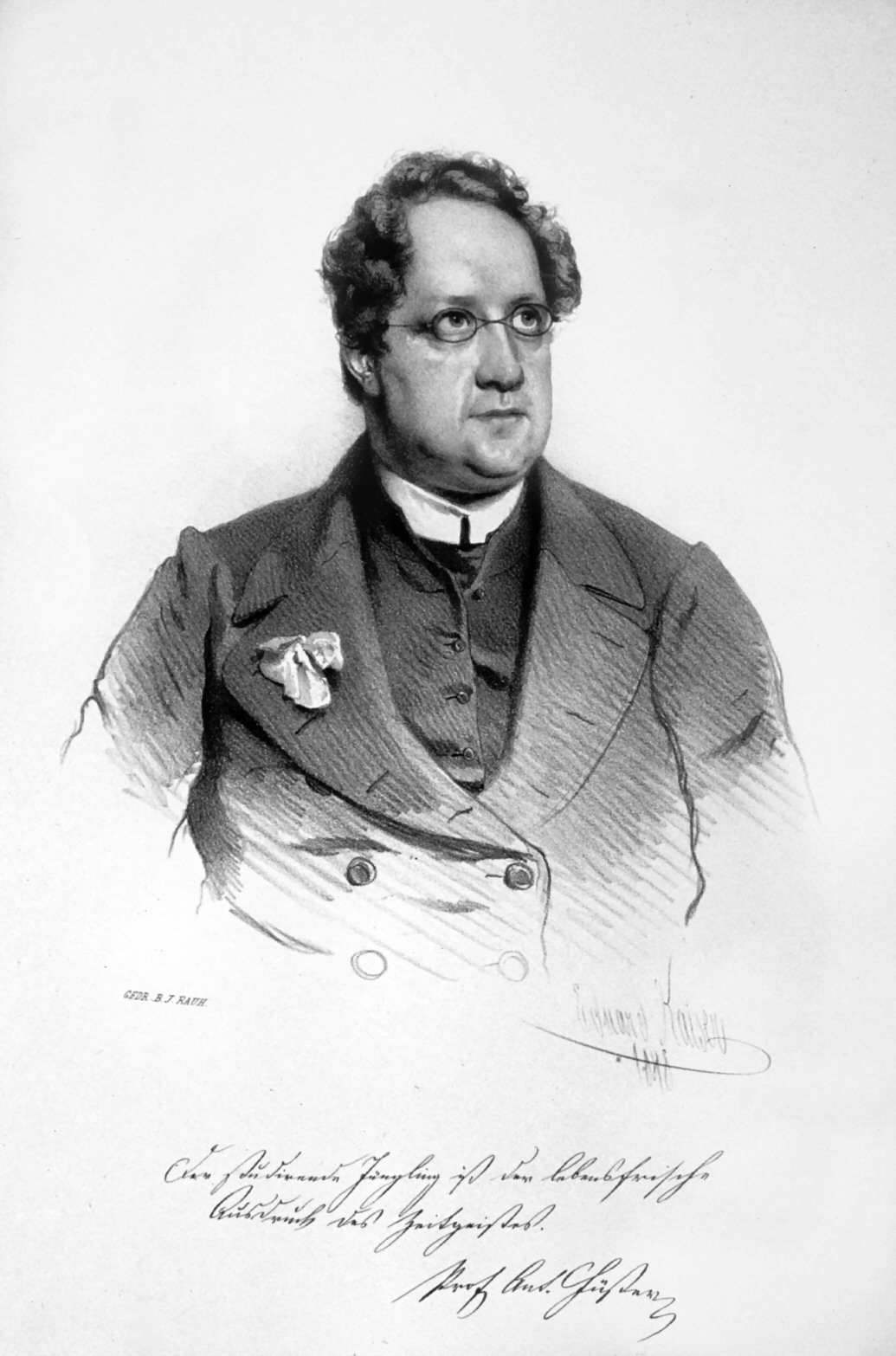
Anton Füster

Anton Füster, also spelled as Fister (5 January 1808 – 12 March 1881) was an Austrian Roman Catholic priest, theologian, pedagogue, radical political activist and author of Slovene origin. He was one of the leaders of the Viennese March Revolution of 1848.

He was born in Radovljica, Carniola (now in Slovenia). He studied in Ljubljana, where he was ordained a priest in 1832. He was part of the intellectual circle of Matija Čop, where he became a friend of the poet France Prešeren. In 1835, he went to Trieste, where he served as a German language preacher. In 1839, he moved to Gorizia, where he worked as a professor of religion and pedagogy at the State Gymnasium. During this period, he became a close friend of the Slovene priest and activist Valentin Stanič, and became an active member of his Association against the Torture of Animals, one of the first animal rights movements in Central Europe. He also instrumental in the introduction of the chair for Slovene language in the priest seminary of the Archdiocese of Gorizia.

In 1847, he was appointed professor of philosophy at the University of Vienna, where he promoted democratic ideas among the students. On Sunday 12 March 1848 Füster gave a sermon that encouraged the students in attendance at the Mass to revolt the next day, 13 March 1848, in the streets of Vienna. The Uprising the developed in Vienna in the following months, was the first major revolt in German lands of 1848, outside the important but relatively minor demonstrations against Lola Montez in Bavaria on 9 February 1848. After the outbreak of the revolution of 1848, Füster became a fervent revolutionary activist; he became a chaplain of the insurgent Academic Guard, and fought on the barricades with students. In the first months of the revolution, he was sympathetic to the Slovene national movement, and was among the academicians who published the manifesto for a United Slovenia in April 1848. He later moved away from the romantic nationalist positions; on 9 August 1848 a group of radical Slovene students, led by Lovro Toman, staged a public event, in which they "solemnly expelled Füster from the people of Slovene descent".

In July 1848, he was elected to the so-called Kremsier Parliament. After its dissolution by the Austrian imperial authorities in March 1849, Füster emigrated to England, and then to the United States, settling in Philadelphia.

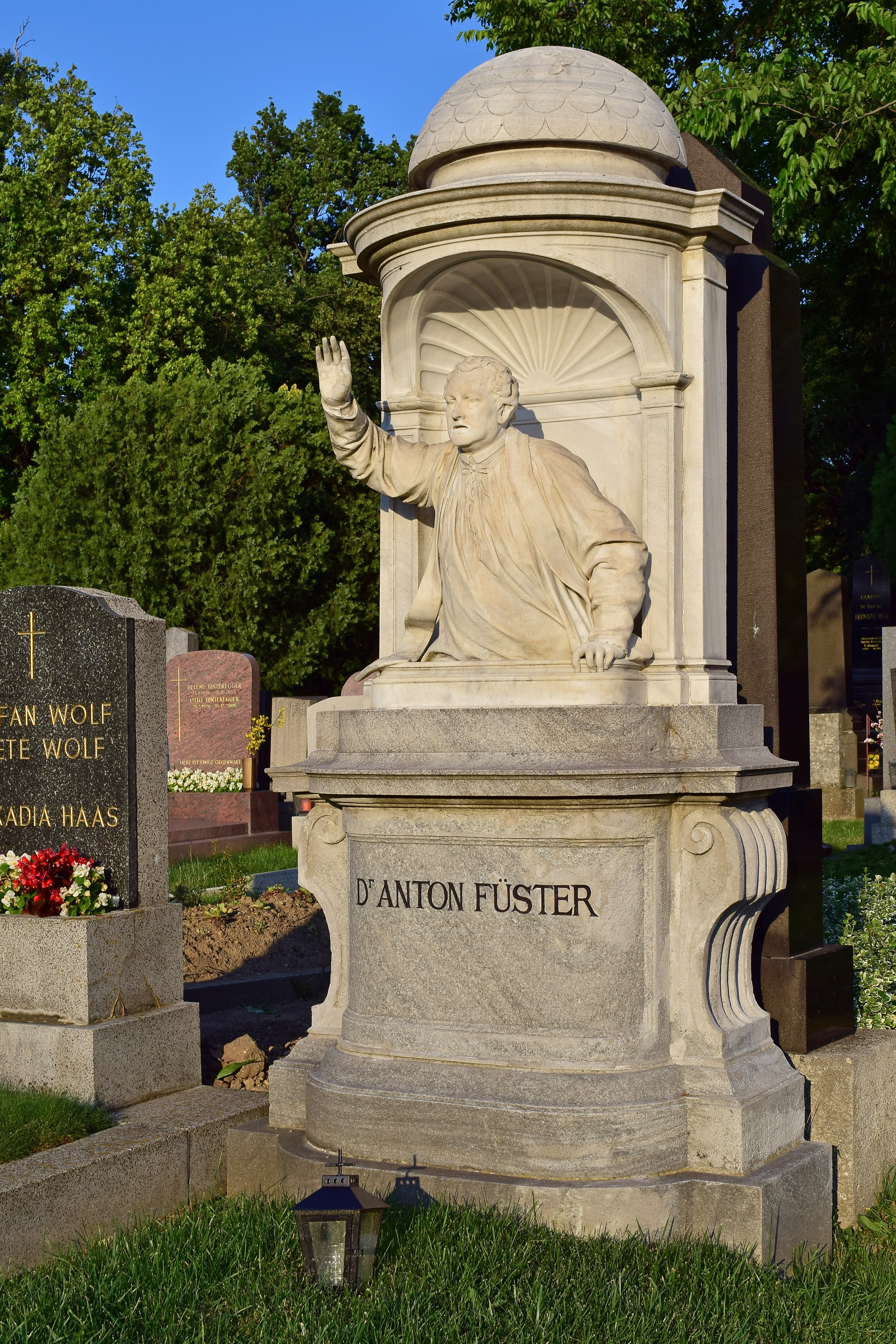
Grave of Anton Füster at the Wiener Zentralfriedhof

He returned to Austria in 1876, first to Graz and then to Vienna, where he published his memories from the revolutionary period. He died in Vienna, where he received an honorary grave on the Wiener Zentralfriedhof.
