= Karel Lavrič =

Carniolan politician

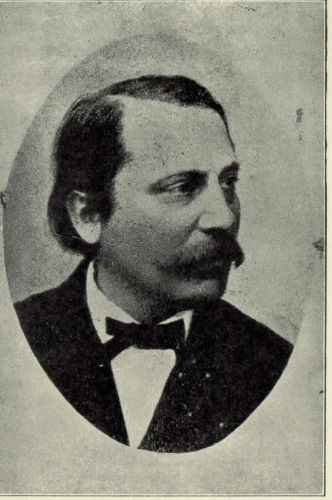
Karel Lavrič

Karel Lavrič, also spelled Laurič or Lauritsch (1 November 1818 – 3 March 1876), was a Carniolan liberal politician and lawyer from the Austrian Littoral. He was of Slovene descent and was one of the most prominent activists of the Young Slovene movement. Together with the conservative Lovro Toman, he was considered among the most popular Slovene politicians of the 19th century. He was also called the 'tribune of Goriška'.

== Early life ==
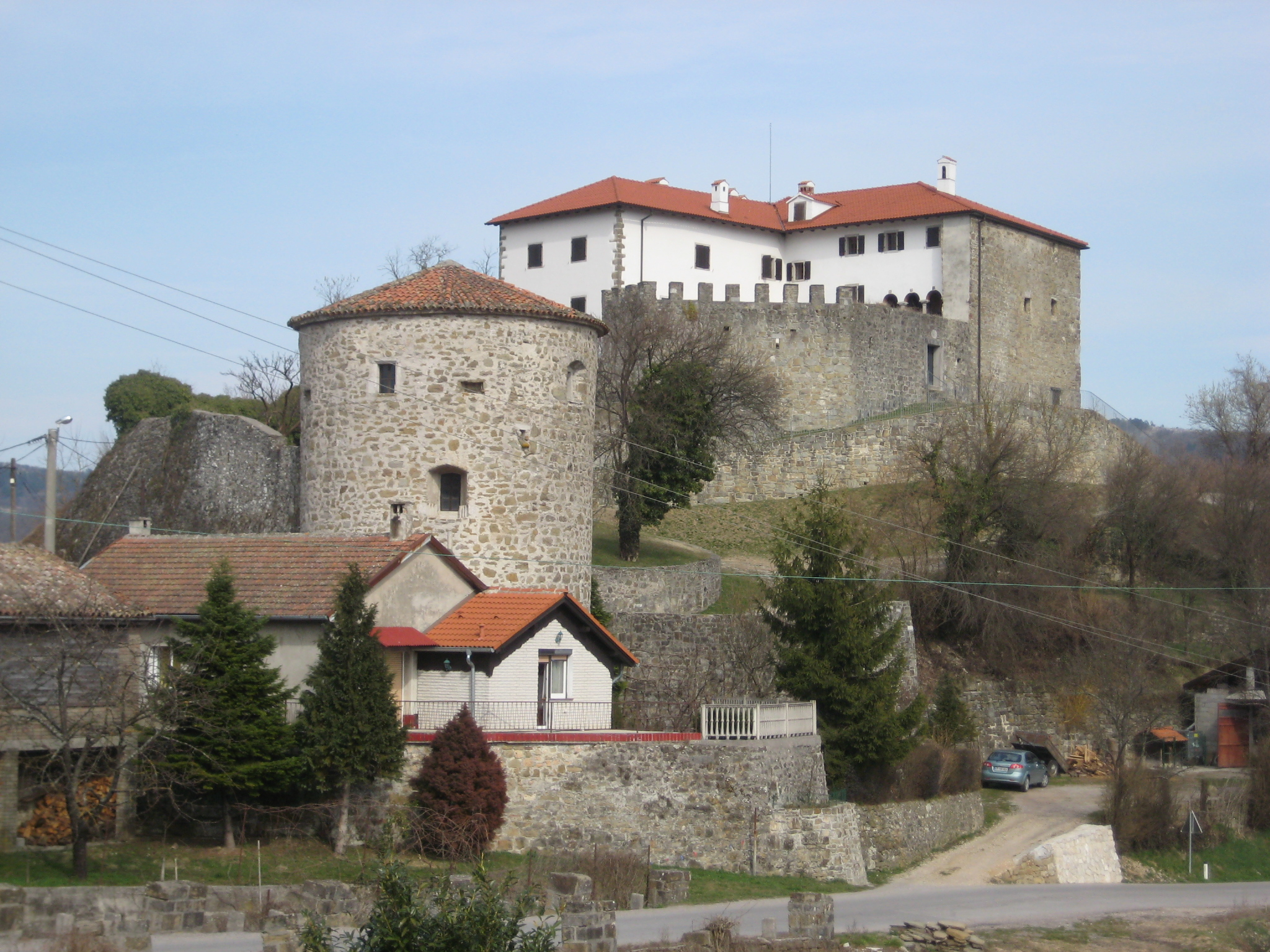
Prem Castle near Ilirska Bistrica, where Lavrič spent his childhood

Born Karel Edvard Lavrič to an upper-middle-class family in the southern Carniola town of Prem (now part of the Municipality of Ilirska Bistrica), his father worked as an Austrian district judge. Karel attended elementary school in Postojna. In 1827, after his father's death, the family moved to Ljubljana, where Karel attended the classical lyceum. In 1835, they moved to Graz. There, he joined the circle of young Slovene intellectuals, organized by Davorin Trstenjak and Stanko Vraz. Between 1839 and 1843, he studied law at the University of Graz. He continued his studies at the University of Padua. Between 1845 and 1848, he travelled extensively around Europe, settling in Trieste shortly before the outbreak of the 1848 revolution.

He rose to public prominence in late April 1848, when he published the article in the Laibacher Zeitung, the influential German-language newspaper from Ljubljana, supporting the maintenance of Styria and the Kingdom of Illyria, where the vast majority of Slovenes lived, in the German Confederation, and the participation of Slovenes in the elections for the Frankfurt Parliament. These positions were close to the ideas of Carniolan pro-German liberals such as Anastasius Grün, but were at odds with the project of an autonomous United Slovenia within the Austrian Empire, supported by most Slovenian liberal nationalists.

At the end of 1848, Lavrič settled in the small town of Sežana near Trieste, where he worked in the Austrian public administration. During this period, he engaged in several successful projects to improve the position of the economically backward Karst region, including a large-scale afforestation program. In 1852, he moved to Tolmin, where he opened a successful law firm. He was active in the cultural life of the local German-speaking elite. In Tolmin, he converted to Lutheranism to please his fiancée Marie Schimpf, daughter of a wealthy German merchant from Trieste. Her rejection pushed Lavrič into a state of deep depression, which culminated with an attempted suicide in early 1860.

== Rise to public prominence ==
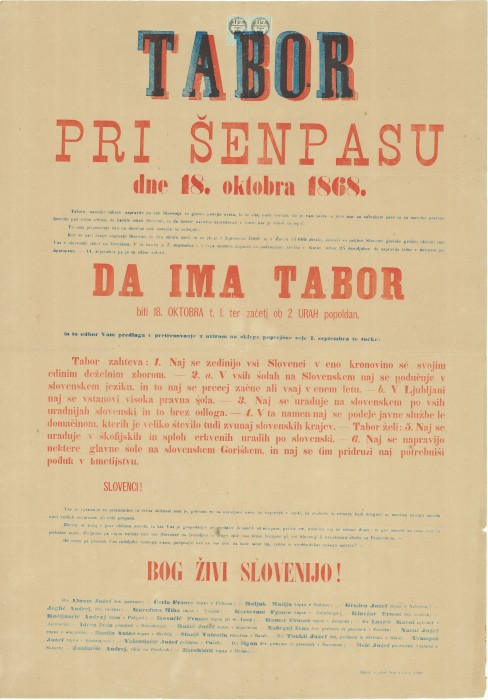
Poster inviting to the mass rally (tabor) in Šempas near Gorizia

After the introduction of the constitution in the Austrian Empire in 1861, Lavrič became politically active again. He soon rose among the leaders of the Slovene national movement in the County of Gorizia and Gradisca. In 1863, he moved to the town of Ajdovščina in the Vipava Valley and in 1869 to Gorizia, the provincial capital. A broadly educated intellectual, he became one of the main theoreticians of the so-called Young Slovenes, the liberal wing of the Slovene national movement. Influenced by the theories of Sismondi, Bluntschli and Karl von Rotteck, he believed in the need of connecting economic reformism with liberal political institutions in a decentralized state. A powerful orator, he travelled around the region to promote his liberal values of constitutionalism, economic improvement, and ethnic and linguistic equality.

Lavrič was among the first Slovene politicians who endorsed the idea of mass public mobilizations of the peasantry in support of the idea of national emancipation. Following the example of Daniel O'Connell's monster meetings, Lavrič helped organizing mass public rallies in support of the program of United Slovenia. These rallies, known as Tabori, which took place between 1868 and 1871, proved extremely successful. Lavrič was personally involved in the organization in 8 of the 18 rallies. Among those, the most successful were the rallies in Šempas near Gorizia in October 1868, attended by around 14,000 people, in Vipava in August 1870 (12,000 people), and in Kastav in Istria in May 1871 (10,000 people).

In 1870, Lavrič was elected to the Provincial diet of Gorizia and Gradisca.

== Last years ==
In the early 1870s, the split between the liberal Young Slovenes and conservatives Old Slovenes became more acute. The two camps established their own political organizations in the County of Gorizia and Gradisca, and Lavrič became the leader of the local Young Slovene faction. His conservative opponents launched many attacks against his personality, ridiculing his idealism and exploiting his Protestant faith in an overwhelmingly and devoutly Roman Catholic constituency. The split reached its climax in 1873, when the local Slovene nationalists failed to gain a seat in the Austrian Parliament due to their internal divisions. The two Slovene factions in Gorizia and Gradisca reached an agreement in 1875, differently from the neighbouring Slovene region of Carniola, where the fight between the two continued, evolving in a two-party system.

Despite the disappointment over the relations within Slovene nationalism, Lavrič continued his public activities, focusing on the fight for the equality of Slovene in public administration and education. His staunch liberalism and universalism gained him the respect of the Italian politicians in the region; one of their most radical leaders, Carlo Favetti, publicly praised Lavrič's patriotism and personal integrity, referring to him as the "Slovenian Garibaldi".

Since the early 1870s, Lavrič suffered from frequent depressions. In 1871 and again in 1876, he spent several months in a sanatorium on the Adriatic coast. In spring of 1876, upon returning from one of these retreats, he committed suicide in his home in Gorizia. He was buried in the local cemetery.

== Sources ==
- PSBL: 'Lavrič, Karel' (pp. 255-259)
