= Etbin Henrik Costa =

Slovene politician (1832–1875)

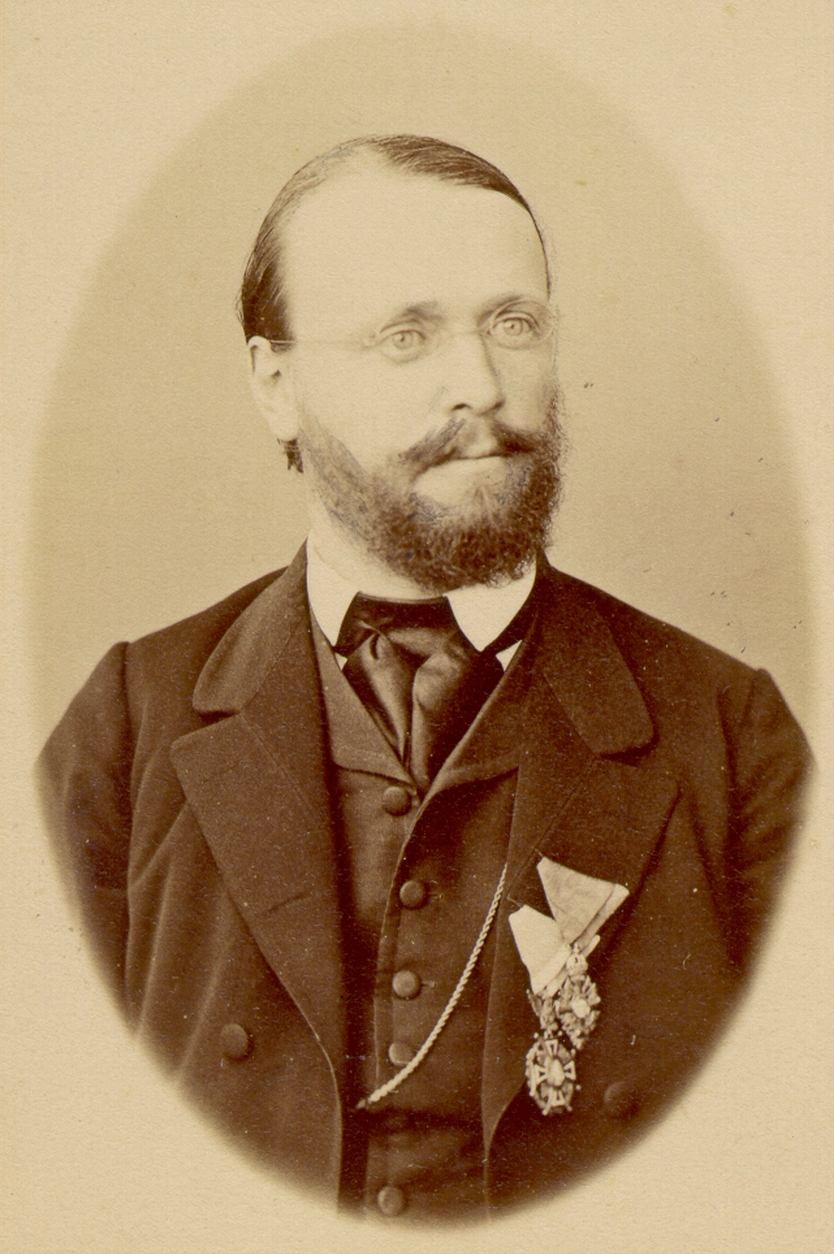
Etbin Henrik Costa

Etbin Henrik Costa (18 October 1832 – 28 January 1875) was a Slovene national conservative politician and author. Together with Janez Bleiweis and Lovro Toman, he was one of the leaders of the Old Slovene political party.

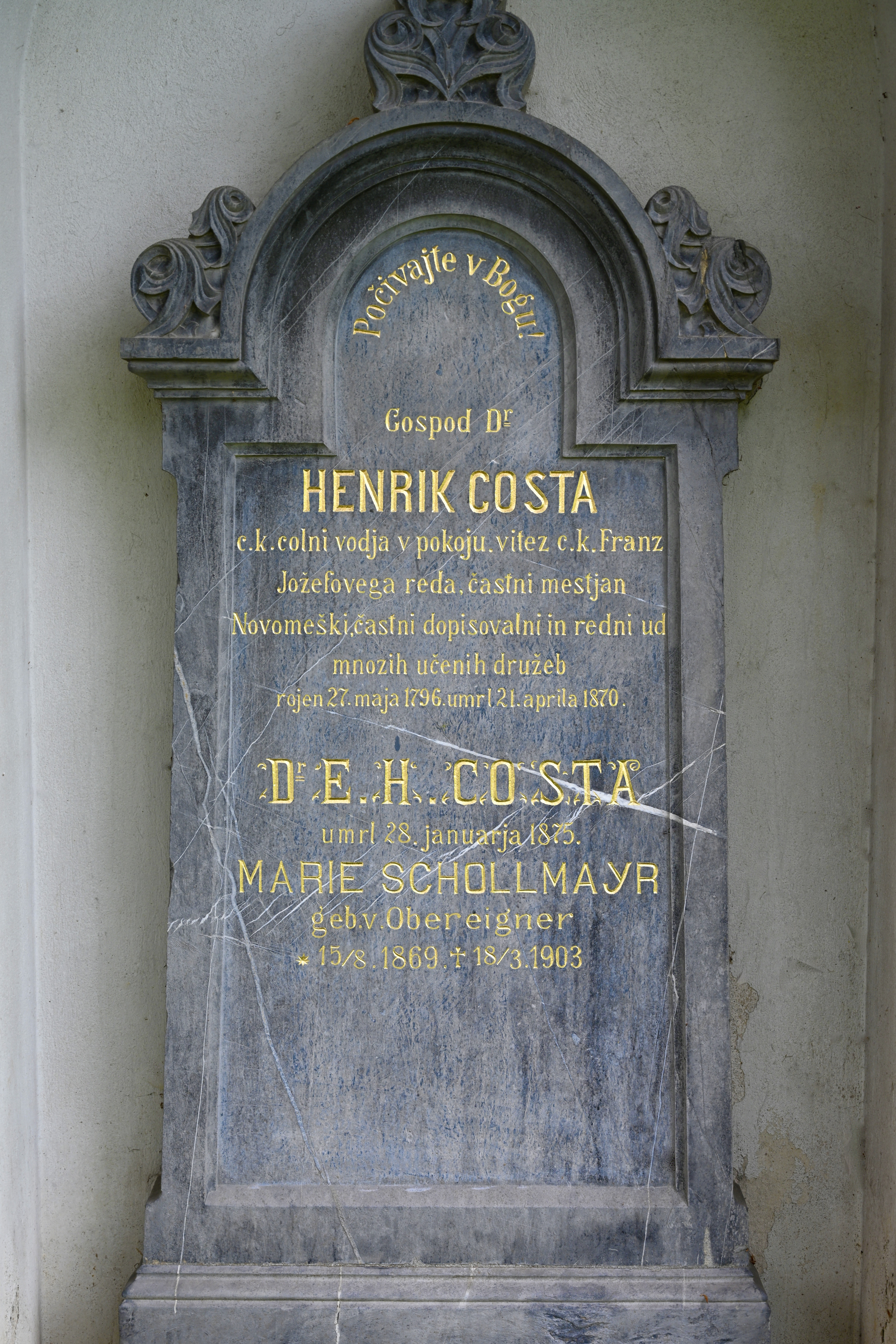
Grave marker of Etbin Henrik Costa and his father Henrik Costa at Navje Memorial Park in Ljubljana

He was born in a wealthy bureaucrat family of Italian origin in the Lower Carniolan town of Novo Mesto, then part of the Austrian Empire (now in Slovenia), and baptized Ethbin Heinrich Costa. His father Henrik Costa (1796–1870) was a historian. Etbin Henrik Costa graduated in philosophy at the University of Vienna and law at the University of Graz.

In 1855, he moved to Ljubljana, where he opened a legal practice. He joined the Slovene National Movement, and became one of the leaders of its conservative stream. He was elected to the Carniolan Provincial Diet, and to the Austrian Imperial Council. Between 1864 and 1869, he served as the first Slovene nationalist mayor of Ljubljana; when he was elected in June 1864, the Slovene national flag was flown on the Ljubljana town hall. His mayorship was utterly unsuccessful, and helped to lay the path to the Austrian Centralist victory in the elections of 1869. After the late 1860s, Costa became one of the most unpopular Slovene national politicians, and the main target of criticism by the national liberal Young Slovenes.

Costa was active in many Slovene cultural, political and sport associations. Among other things, he served as president of the scientific association Slovenska matica, and of the Slovene section of the Sokol movement.

He died in Ljubljana in 1875.

== Sources ==
Media related to Etbin Henrik Costa at Wikimedia Commons

- Short biography (in Slovene)
