= Bogumil Vošnjak =

Slovene and Yugoslav jurist, politician, diplomat, author and legal historian

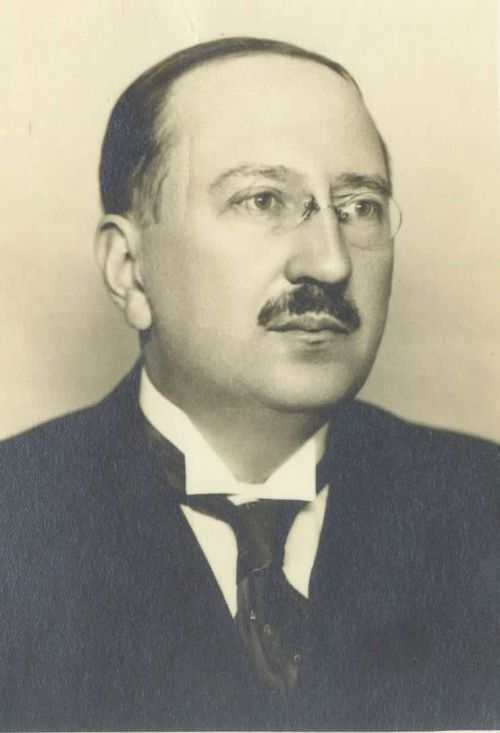
Bogumil Vošnjak in the 1920s

Bogumil Vošnjak, also known as Bogomil Vošnjak (9 September 1882 – 18 June 1955), was a Slovene and Yugoslav jurist, politician, diplomat, author, and legal historian. He often wrote under the pseudonym Illyricus.

== Biography ==
He was born as Bogomil Vošnjak in Celje, then part of the Austro-Hungarian Duchy of Styria, in the Slovene branch of the notable Styrian industrialist Vošnjak/Woschnagg family. His father Miha Vošnjak, native from Šoštanj, was one of the founders of liberal-progressive peasant cooperatives in Lower Styria. His uncle Josip Vošnjak, was the leader of the Slovene National Progressive Party in Lower Styria. He attended the elementary school in Celje and later in Graz, where he moved with his father. He later returned to Celje, where he enrolled to the First Celje Grammar School. In 1896 he moved to Gorizia, where he attended the Gorizia Grammar School, graduating in 1901. He then went to Vienna, where he studied law at the University of Vienna. After graduating in 1906, he continued his studies at the École Libre des Sciences Politiques in Paris and at the University of Heidelberg. In 1912, he got employed as a lecturer at the University of Zagreb. It was at this time that he started using the Croatian version of his name, Bogumil.

During his student years, Vošnjak travelled extensively. He visited Palestine, Egypt, Russia and travelled throughout the Balkans. In 1902, he published his travelogue in Slovene under the title Zapiski mladega popotnika ("Notes of a Young Traveller").

In 1909, on the 100th anniversary of the establishment of the Illyrian Provinces, Vošnjak wrote his first scientific monography, "The Constitution and Administration of the Illyrian Provinces", which was published the following year by the Slovene publishing house Slovenska matica. During this time, he also campaigned for the establishment of a Slovene university in Trieste, together with his friend and professor from the Gorizia years, Henrik Tuma.

Upon the outbreak of World War I, Vošnjak was mobilized in the Austro-Hungarian Army and sent to the Eastern Front in Galicia. He took advantage of a discharge in April 1915 to visit Gorizia, from where he crossed the border with Italy and fled to Venice and from there to Switzerland. Already in May of the same year, he published a book in French, entitled "The Question of Trieste", in which he advocated the unification of the city with a future Yugoslav state.

In Switzerland, Vošnjak established contacts with Ante Trumbić, a Croatian emigrant from Dalmatia, and joined the Yugoslav Committee, a political interest group formed by South Slavs from Austria-Hungary aimed at the unification of the South Slavic peoples in an independent state. In 1917, he was among the signers of the Corfu Declaration, a joined political statement of the Yugoslav Committee and the representatives of the Kingdom of Serbia, which was the first step in the creation of Yugoslavia.

After the end of War, Vošnjak moved to Paris, where he worked for the Yugoslav delegation at the Versailles Peace Conference. In 1920, he returned to his homeland, and was elected to the constitutional assembly of the Kingdom of Serbs, Croats and Slovenes on the list of the liberal Slovene Independent Agrarian Party. In the Assembly, Vošnjak strongly advocated a centralist and monarchist framework of the new country, against most deputies from Slovenia, Croatia and Dalmatia, who favoured federalism. In February 1921, Vošnjak attacked the Autonomist Declaration, signed by some of the most prominent Slovene liberal and progressive intellectuals, who demanded cultural and political autonomy for Slovenia within Yugoslavia.

Between 1923 and 1924, he served as ambassador of the Kingdom of Serbs, Croats and Slovenes to Czechoslovakia. In 1924, he settled in Belgrade. During the Nazi German occupation of Serbia between 1941 and 1944, Vošnjak supported the Chetnik underground network of general Draža Mihajlović.

After the Communists took power in Yugoslavia in 1945, Vošnjak emigrated to the United States. He worked at the Columbia University Libraries and later as an expert for the House Un-American Activities Committee. Between 1952 and 1953, he lectured at the University of California, Berkeley on "Government and Politics in the Balkan Countries".

He died in Washington, D.C., in 1955.

== Major works ==
- Zapiski mladega popotnika ("Notes of a Young Traveller"; Gorizia, 1902)
- Na razsvitu: ruske študije ("In the Land on the Dawn: Russian Studies"; Ljubljana, 1906)
- Ustava in uprava Ilirskih provinc ("Constitution and Administration of the Illyrian Provinces"; Ljubljana, 1910)
- La Question de Trieste ("The Trieste Question"; Geneva, 1915)
- Yugoslav Nationalism, with the preface by Michael Ernest Sadler (London, 1916)
- A Bulwark Against Germany (London, 1917)
- A chapter of the Old Slovenian Democracy, with the preface by Niko Županič (London, 1917)
- L'administration française dans les pays yougoslaves (1809-1813) ("The French Administration in the Yugoslav Lands (1809-1813)"; Paris, 1917)
- A Dying Empire: Central Europe, Pan-Germanism, and the Downfall of Austria-Hungary, with the preface by T. P. O'Connor (London, 1918)
- Les origines du Royaume des Serbes, Croates et Slovènes ("The Origines of the Kingdom of Serbs, Croats and Slovenes"; Paris, 1919)
- La question de L' Adriatique : le comté de Goritz et de Gradisca ("The Adriatic Question: the County of Gorizia and Gradisca"; Paris, 1919)
- U borbi za ujedinjenu narodnu državu ("The Fight for a Unified National State"; Ljubljana, 1928)
- Pobeda Jugoslavije: nacionalne misli i predlozi ("The Victory of Yugoslavia: National Thoughts and Proposals"; Belgrade, 1929)
- Tri Jugoslavije ("The Three Yugoslavias"; Ljubljana, 1939)

== See also ==
- Milko Brezigar

== Sources ==
- Božo Repe: From the Versailles Conference to the Osimo Agreements
- "Vošnjak, Bogumil" in Slovenski biografski leksikon ed. by Izidor Cankar (Ljubljana: Zadružna gospodarska banka & Slovenian Academy of Sciences and Arts, 1925–1990)
- Slovenska kronika XX. stoletja, 1900-1941 (Ljubljana: Nova revija, 1995)
