= Slovene Society =

Publishing house in Slovenia

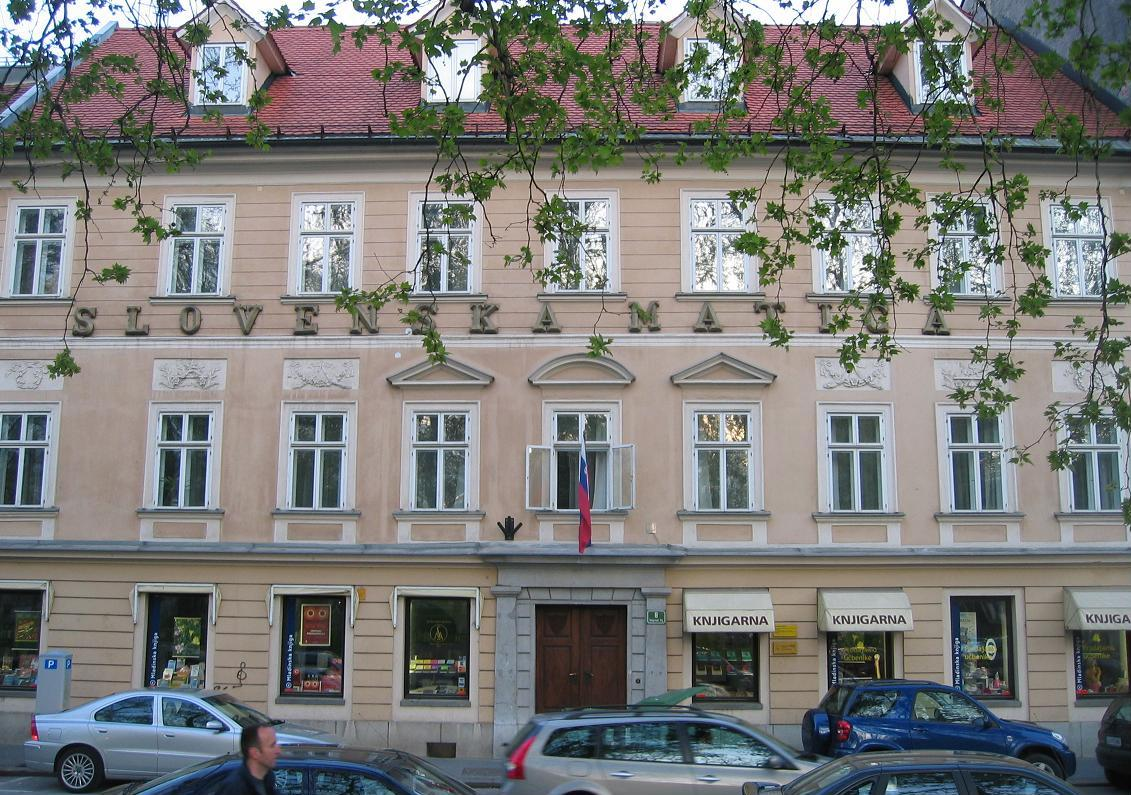
The seat of the Slovene Society at Congress Square in Ljubljana

The Slovene Society (Slovene: Slovenska matica, (Note: The name Matica can be literally translated into English as the "Queen Bee," which is a metaphor meaning "the parent body of the Slovenes.") also Matica slovenska) is the second-oldest publishing house in Slovenia, founded on 4 February 1864 as an institution for the scholarly and cultural progress of Slovenes.

== History ==
The Slovene Society was founded upon the proposal of several Slovene patriotic associations and individuals from Maribor, who urged the establishment of an institution that would publish advanced scholarly literature in Slovene, foster the expansion of culture among Slovenes, and development of scientific terminology in Slovene. In 1864, the consortium Slovenska matica was founded in Ljubljana. Its work was based on the examples of similar institutions in other Slavic countries, such as the Maćica Serbska in Lusatia, Matica hrvatska in Croatia, Matica srpska in Vojvodina, Matice česká in the Czech Lands, and Matica slovenská in Slovakia. The consortium was established with private capital, as well as with capital of the Duchy of Carniola and several cultural associations. The Austrian Emperor Francis Joseph I also gave a substantial financial contribution for its founding.

The institution reached its peak at the beginning of the 20th century. At that time, it functioned as a regular publishing house on a free market, publishing books for a general public, many of which became bestsellers; at the same time, it also performed the role of an Academy of Sciences, fostering high culture and maintaining close contacts with the Yugoslav Academy of Sciences and Arts in Zagreb, the Serbian Academy of Sciences and Arts in Belgrade, as well as similar institutions in Prague, Kraków, London and Saint Petersburg.

During World War I, the SM was closed and its properties confiscated by the Austro-Hungarian authorities. The alleged cause was the publication of the book Gospodin Franjo ("Mister Franjo") by the Slovene author and officer of the Austro-Hungarian Army Fran Maselj (pen name: Podlimbarski), which was a strong satirical critique of the Austro-Hungarian occupation of Bosnia and Herzegovina.

During the Kingdom of Yugoslavia, the Slovene Society expanded its publishing work and in 1938 it was one of the co-founders of the Slovenian Academy of Sciences and Arts. During the Italian occupation in World War II, the leadership of the Slovene Society collaborated with the Liberation Front of the Slovene People. In 1944, it was shut down by the Nazi German authorities. In the late 1945, the communist authorities of the People's Republic of Slovenia allowed the society to be re-established, although its editorial policies were considered "too conservative" by the new regime. Most of its properties were nationalized by the state, but the institution was allowed to continue functioning and later received substantial subsidies.

The work of the institution was reinvigorated again in the 1980s, when it started systemically publishing translations of major Western philosophers and political theorists, including authors regarded as subversive of the official Socialist ideology, such as Heidegger, Machiavelli, Jan Patočka, Unamuno, José Ortega y Gasset, Aurelius Augustinus, and the complete works of Nietzsche.

== Chairmen ==
Since its establishment, the Slovene Society has been headed by important figures from Slovene cultural and public life.

- 1865: Anton Zois, politician and philanthropist
- 1865–1869: Lovro Toman, lawyer, author and politician
- 1869–1875: Etbin Henrik Costa, lawyer and politician
- 1875–1881: Janez Bleiweis, politician
- 1881–1882: Josip Marn, literary historian
- 1882–1885: Peter Grasselli, politician, mayor of Ljubljana
- 1885–1886: Josip Poklukar, editor
- 1886–1893: Josip Marn
- 1893–1907: Fran Levec, literary historian
- 1907–1914: Fran Ilešič, literary historian
- 1917: Peter Grasselli
- 1918–1920: Ivan Tavčar, author and politician, mayor of Ljubljana
- 1920–1947: Dragotin Lončar, historian and political theorist
- 1947–1949: Oton Župančič, poet
- 1950–1966: Anton Melik, geographer
- 1966–1975: France Koblar, art historian
- 1975–1978: Fran Zwitter, historian
- 1978–1987: Bogo Grafenauer, historian
- 1987–1994: Primož Simoniti, classical philologist, historian and translator
- 1994–2008: Joža Mahnič, literary historian
- since 2008: Milček Komelj, art historian and critic

== Editors and chancellors ==
Many prominent individuals served as editors and chancellors (chief secretaries) of the institution. The most prominent of these were Fran Levstik, Josip Vidmar, Juš Kozak, France Bernik, and Drago Jančar. Several others have collaborated with the institution, including philosophers Ivo Urbančič and Tine Hribar, historian Vasilij Melik and political theorist Albin Prepeluh.
