= Laibacher Zeitung =

Historical German newspaper

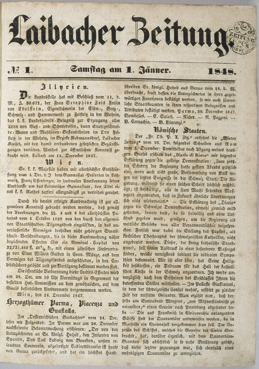
- Front page of the Laibacher Zeitung, 1848
- Type: Daily newspaper
- Format: Broadsheet
- Owner: Kleinmayr
- Founded: 1778
- Ceased publication: 1918
- Language: German
- Headquarters: Ljubljana
- ISSN: 1580-8645
- OCLC number: 439636366
- Website: https://laibacher-zeitung.si

Laibacher Zeitung (meaning Ljubljana News in English) was the largest and most influential newspaper in Ljubljana in the 18th and 19th centuries. It was published daily in German from 1778 to 1918.

== History and profile ==
Laibacher Zeitung was established in 1778. In its first period, it was published with the supplement Intelligenzblatt aimed at spreading knowledge among the general public. After 1804, it was published with the supplement Wochenblatt zum Nutzen und Vergnügen, replaced in 1818 by the supplement Illyrisches Blatt, which was then published until 1849. Illyrisches Blatt was the center of Slovene cultural creativity. Its contributors were the Slovene national poet France Prešeren and other influential Slovene intellectuals such as Matija Čop, Miha Kastelic, Franc Malavašič, and Janez Bleiweis.

After the establishment of the Slovene-language newspaper Kmetijske in rokodelske novice in 1842, the influence of the Laibacher Zeitung declined because it gradually became the herald of the German-speaking community in the Slovene lands. The paper ceased publication in 1918.

== Sources ==
- Laibacher Zeitung s prilogami. National and University Library of Slovenia. (in Slovene)
