= Kamna Gorica, Radovljica =

Kamna Gorica
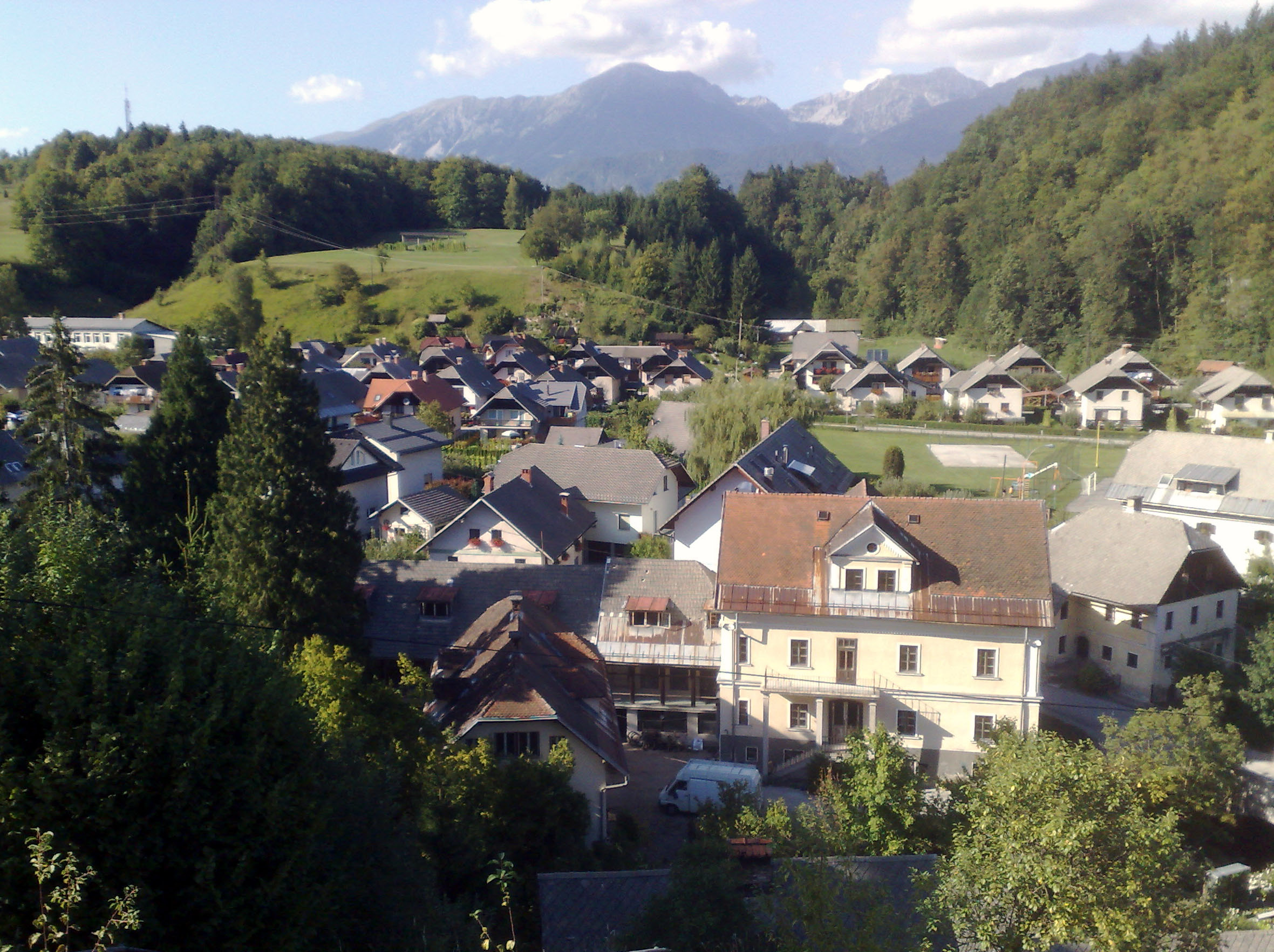

- Location in Slovenia
- Coordinates: 46°19′2.6″N 14°11′37.98″E
- Country: Slovenia
- Traditional region: Upper Carniola
- Statistical region: Upper Carniola
- Municipality: Radovljica
- Elevation: 538 m (1,765 ft)

Population (2017)
  - Total: 527

Kamna Gorica (pronounced [ˈkaːmna ɡɔˈɾiːtsa]) is a village in the Municipality of Radovljica in the Upper Carniola region of Slovenia.

== Church ==
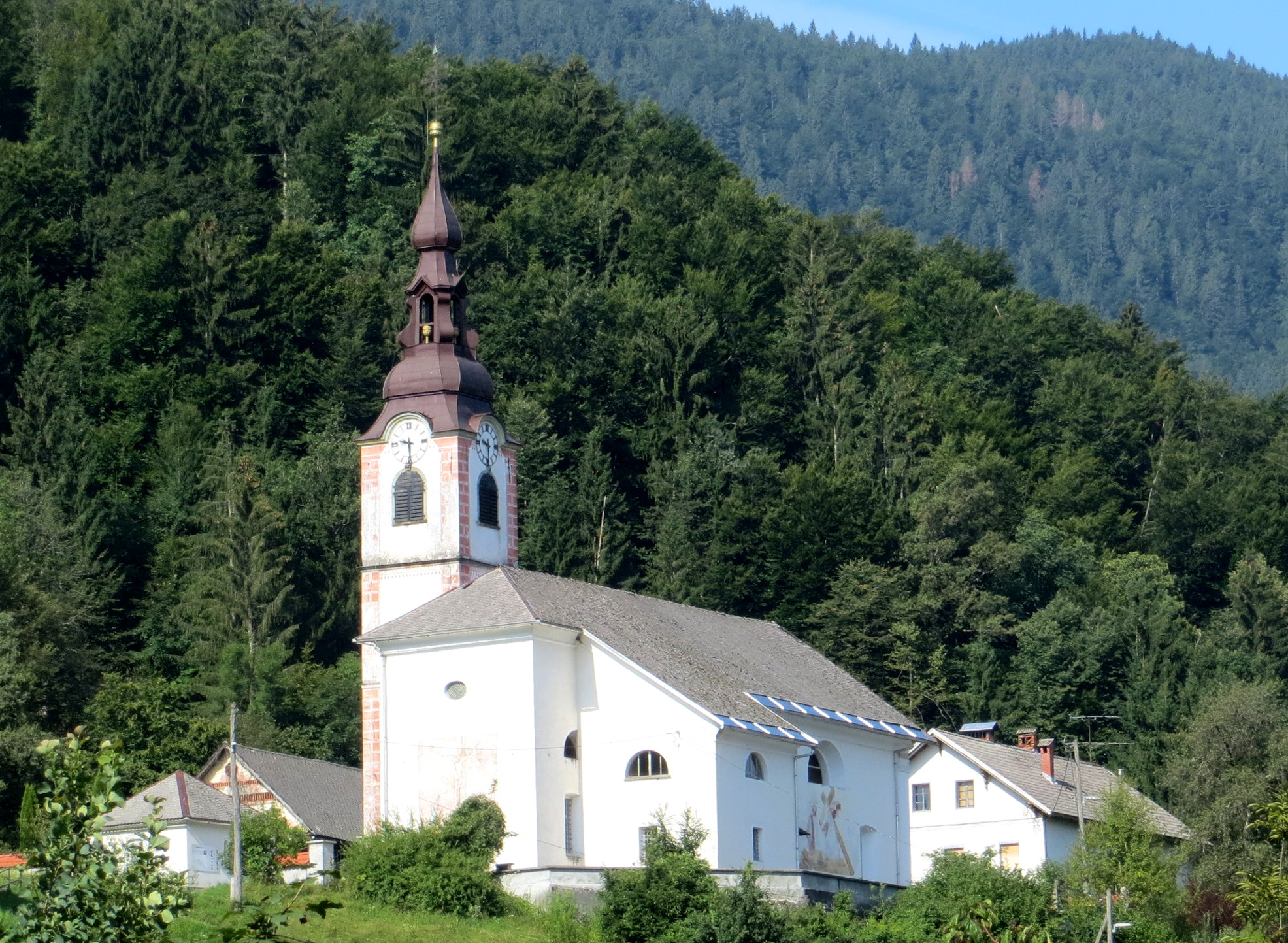
Holy Trinity Church

The local church, dedicated to the Holy Trinity, was built in 1652 and enlarged in 1754. It has two altar paintings by Matevž Langus.

== Mineral spring ==
A major quarry is located to the southwest of the village. Next to it, there is a chalybeate (iron-rich) water spring. According to the locals, it strengthens male potency, which has been extensively reported about by the prominent journalist Tone Fornezzi.

== Notable people ==
Notable people that were born or lived in Kamna Gorica include:

- Karl Josef Kappus (born 1668), lawyer, member of Academia operosorum Labacensium
- Johannes Andreas Kappus (c. 1648–1713), Jesuit
- Marcus Antonius Kappus (1657–1717), missionary
- Vladimir Kapus (1885–1943), journalist, writer
- Leopold Kordeš (1808–1879), journalist, writer, poet
- Matevž Langus (1792–1855), painter
- Franc Megušar (1876–1916), zoologist
- Lovro Pogačnik (1880–1919), politician
- Franc Pretnar (1912–1988), scales technician, precision mechanic, inventor, innovator, engraver
- Aleksander Toman (1851–1931), agronomist, journalist
- Lovro Toman (1827–1870), politician
- Blaž Tomaževič (1909–1986), literary historian, teacher
- Jožef Tomažovič Sr. (1774–1847), musician, teacher
- Jernej Uršič (1784–1860), national awakener, priest
- Ivan Varl (1923–1979), painter
- Ignacij Zupan (1853–1915), pipe organ builder
