= Liberalism in Slovenia =

This article gives an overview of liberalism in Slovenia. It is limited to liberal parties with substantial support, mainly proved by having had a representation in parliament. The sign ⇒ means a reference to another party in that scheme. For inclusion in this scheme it isn't necessary so that parties labeled themselves as a liberal party.

== History ==
After the independence of Slovenia former young socialists claim to have restarted the liberal tradition of former Austria-Hungary. Their organized liberalism became a major political force. The Liberal Democracy of Slovenia (Liberalna demokracija Slovenije, becomes a member of the LI and the ELDR) and profiles itself as a left of center liberal party. Others argue that there have been no liberal parties in Slovenia since independence in 1991. They say that claims of the former communist youth (ZSMS) and LDS that they represent liberal parties with liberal doctrines are political propaganda and that facts demonstrate that both ZSMS and LDS followed socialist and anti liberal policies.

=== From National Party of Carniola to Democratic Party ===
- 1894: Ivan Tavčar led the Young Slovenes to establish the National Party of Carniola (Narodna stranka za Krajnsko). In Gorizia related groups formed the National Progressive Party in 1900
- 1905: The Carniolan party is renamed National Progressive Party (Narodno napredna stranka). In Upper Styria related groups formed the National Party of Styria (Narodna stranka za Štajersko)
- 1918: The three party merged into the Yugoslav Democratic Party (Jugoslovanska demokratska stranka)
- 1919: The party merged with Serbian and Croatian into the pan-Yugoslav more or less liberal State Party of Serbian, Croatian and Slovene Democrats (Državnotvorna stranka demokrata Srba, Hrvata i Slovenaca). Some of the Slovene liberals did not join JDS and founded Independent Agrarian Party (Samostojna kmetijska stranka) and National-Socialist Party (Narodno-socialistična stranka). Except the name, the latter did not have much in common with German Nazis and could have been described as a social liberal party.
- 1919: The party is renamed into the Democratic Community (Demokratska zajednica)
- 1920: The party is renamed into the Democratic Party (Demokratska stranka). Leader is Ljubomir Davidović
- 1924: A faction, including the majority of prominent Slovene liberals formed the Independent Democratic Party (Samostojna demokratska stranka), mainly active in Croatia, Bosnia, Vojvodina and Slovenia
- 1929: After the royal coup, all parties were banned.
- 1931: Slovene liberals leaders joined the government party (Yugoslav Radical-Peasant Democracy - Jugoslovenska radikalno-kmečka demokracija), from 1934 Yugoslav National Party (Jugoslovenska nacionalna stranka). *1935-1941: JNS was in opposition.
- 1941-1945: Following the Axis occupation of Yugoslavia, political parties were dissolved but continued activities in underground. Facing the communist insurgence, Slovene liberals co-founded the underground national organization Slovene Covenant (Slovenska zaveza).
- 1945: All democratic parties were dissolved and banned.

=== From ZSMS-Liberal Party to Freedom Movement ===
- 1989: The Socialist Youth League of Slovenia (abbreviated ZSMS) changes its name into Za Svobodo Mislecega Sveta (For the Freedom of a Thinking World) and is shortly after reorganised into the Liberal Party (ZSMS - Liberalna stranka)
- 1989: Oppositionals established the Slovenian Democratic League (Slovenska demokratična zveza)
- 1990: The party is renamed into the Liberal Democratic Party (Liberalno demokratska stranka)
- 1991: The party is renamed Democratic Party (Demokratska Stranka), led by Dimitrij Rupel
- 1991: The party merged with the ⇒ Democratic Party, a faction of the Slovenian Greens' and the Socialist Party of Slovenia into the Liberal Democracy of Slovenia (Liberalna demokracija Slovenije), led by Janez Drnovšek
- 2004: Active Slovenia (Aktivna Slovenija) split from Youth Party of Slovenia.
- 2006: Zoran Janković founded Zoran Janković List (Lista Zorana Jankovića).
- 2007: Zares split from ⇒ LDS and merged with Active Slovenia.
- 2011: Zoran Janković founded Positive Slovenia (Pozitivna Slovenija) which also join LDS and Zares members
- 2014: Alenka Bratušek split from PS and founded Alliance of Alenka Bratušek (Zavezništvo Alenke Bratušek)
- 2014: Miro Cerar founded Party of Miro Cerar (Stranka Mira Cerarja)
- 2014: Marjan Šarec founded List of Marjan Šarec (Lista Marjana Šarca)
- 2014: Jelko Kacin leaves LDS and founds Kacin - Concretely (Kacin - Konkretno)
- 2014: Igor Šoltes founded Believe (Verjamem)
- 2015: Zares dissolved
- 2016: ZaAB is renamed Alliance of Social Liberal Democrats (Zavezništvo socialno-liberalnih demokratov)
- 2016: This party is renamed Modern Centre Party (Stranka modernega centra)
- 2017: ZaSLD is renamed Party of Alenka Bratušek (Stranka Alenke Bratušek)
- 2018: Miro Cerar left the SMC after joining the 14th Government of Slovenia
- 2021: Former SMC member Jure Leben founded Green Actions Party (Stranka zelenih dejanj).
- 2021: SMC merged with the ⇒ Economic Active Party into the Concretely (Konkretno).
- 2021: Igor Zorčič split from SMC and founded Liberal Democrats (Liberalni demokrati).
- 2022: Green Actions is renamed Freedom Movement (Gibanje Svoboda). SAB and LMŠ merged into ⇒ the Freedom Movement. Verjamem dissolves.

=== Civic List ===
- 2011: Gregor Virant founded Gregor Virant's Civic List (Državljanska lista Gregorja Viranta)
- 2012: LGV is renamed Civic List (Državljanska lista)

== Liberal leaders ==
- Janez Drnovšek - Anton Rop
- Alenka Bratušek
- Miro Cerar
- Marjan Šarec
- Robert Golob

== See also ==
- Free Society Institute
- History of Slovenia
- Politics of Slovenia
- List of political parties in Slovenia
