= Poljane Gymnasium =

- Gimnazija Poljane
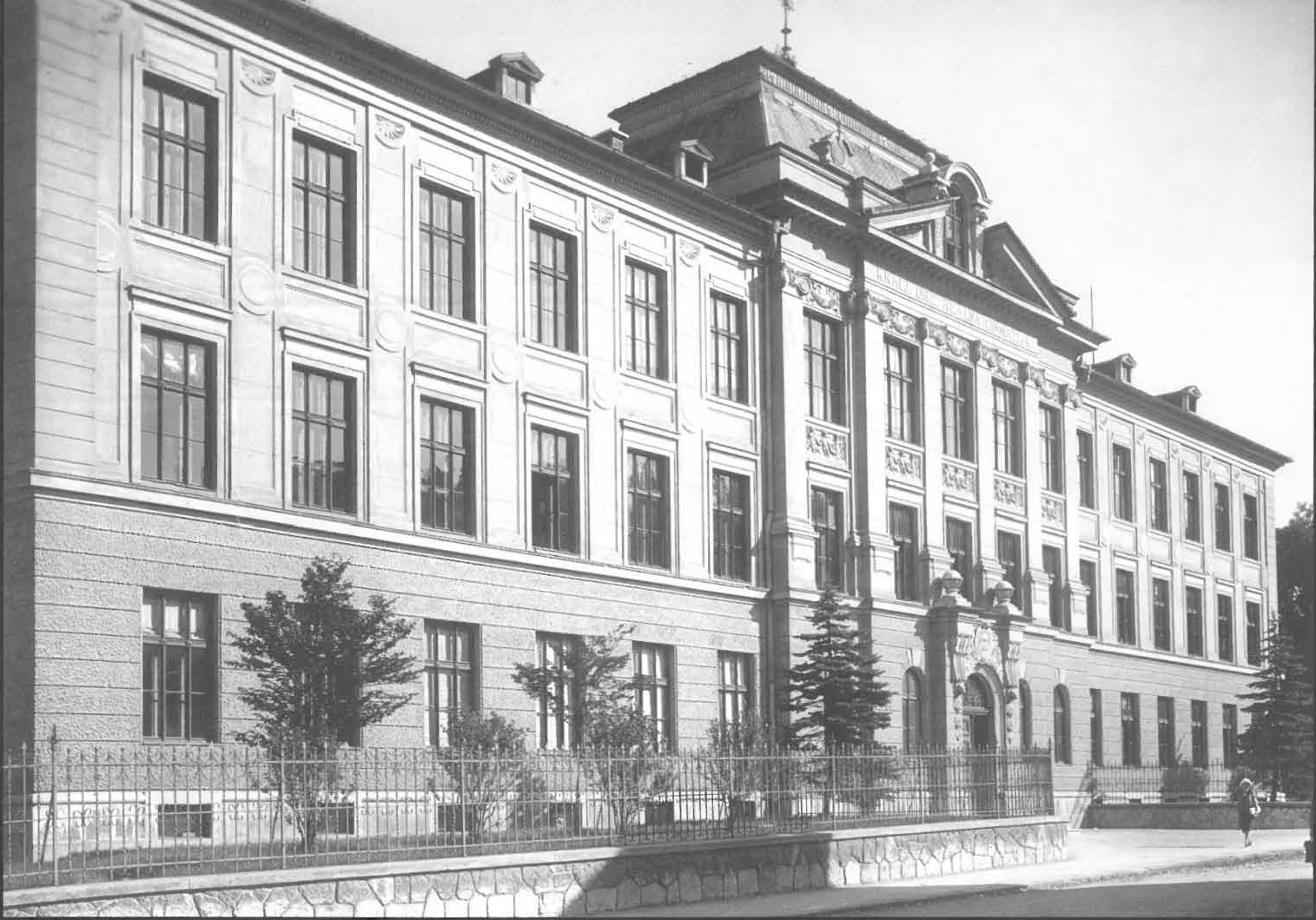
- Poljane Gymnasium in 1927

Location
- Strossmayerjeva 1 Ljubljana; Slovenia
- 46°03′0″N 14°30′49″E

Information
- Type: general gymnasium, classical gymnasium
- Established: 1889
- Head of school: Srečko Zgaga
- Staff: 100
- Age range: 15-19
- Enrollment: 900
- Classes: 32
- Website: www.gimnazija-poljane.com

The Poljane Gymnasium (Slovene: Gimnazija Poljane) is located in Ljubljana, the capital of Slovenia. It is a coeducational nondenominational state gymnasium (secondary general education school for students aged between 15 and 19). It prepares them for university, which they can enroll at after passing the matura (leaving exam).

== History ==
The Poljane Gymnasium was founded in 1889 as a lower secondary school with German as the language of instruction. Its initial name was "Second State Gymnasium". In 1900, it was expanded to include 15- to 19-year-olds as well. In the present building classes started in 1907. In 1918 the building was renovated and German was replaced by Slovene as the language of instruction. By 1921, the Poljane Gymnasium was the largest secondary school in Slovenia. Several school reforms changed the curriculum and the name of the school. These names included "Gymnasium No. 2", "Gymnasium No. 5", and "Vida Janežič Gymnasium" (the last name refers to the Communist-era hero Vida Janežič, 1914-1944). In 1990 the school was renamed the Poljane Gymnasium.

== Main characteristics ==
The school's curriculum consists of two programs: the general program (splošna gimnazija) and the classical program (klasična gimnazija), in which one of the foreign languages is Latin. A change introduced three years ago is European classes, in which the general program incorporates the latest trends: project approach, authentic interdisciplinary learning, team teaching of foreign languages with the aim of increasing the intercultural competence of students.

The Poljane Gymnasium offers its students the possibility to choose among a broad range of foreign languages. All students in school study at least two foreign languages, some study three or even four. In addition to English or German as the first foreign language (starting at an intermediate level), they can pick one or two at a beginner level, choosing from German, French, Spanish, Italian, Russian and Classical Greek in the classical program. The second foreign language is studied for all four years, the third one for two or three. In the classical program, Latin is a compulsory subject with a focal role in the curriculum.

== Quality of education ==
There are very few, if any, dropouts, and the academic performance of students is very good. This is shown annually in the results of the leaving exam. Every year, the average results of students are high above the national average, and the number of students who pass with distinction is among the highest in the country.

== Notable people ==
Notable instructors:

- Franček Bohanec, author and literary historian
- Božidar Jakac, painter
- Andrej Karlin, prelate, bishop of Trieste
- France Koblar, art historian
- Ferdo Kozak, author and politician
- Juš Kozak, writer
- Dragutin Mate, diplomat and politician
- Emilija Mlakar Branc, mathematician and author of mathematics textbooks
- Simon Rutar, historian
- Oton Župančič, poet
- Fran Zwitter, historian

Notable alumni:

- Bojan Adamič, composer and photographer
- Igor Evgen Bergant, sports commentator
- Alenka Gotar, singer
- Tamara Griesser Pečar, historian
- Arne Hodalič, photographer and journalist
- Zoran Janković, manager and politician, mayor of Ljubljana
- Zmago Jelinčič Plemeniti, politician
- Taras Kermauner, literary historian, philosopher and essayist
- Ernst Mally, Austrian philosopher
- Vasilij Melik, historian
- Boris A. Novak, author
- Alenka Puhar, journalist, author, and human rights activist
- Vasko Simoniti, historian and politician
- Matjaž Šinkovec, diplomat and politician
- Gregor Strniša, poet
- Igor Torkar, writer
- Vladimir Truhlar, poet and theologian
- Dane Zajc, poet and playwright
