= Andrej Einspieler =

Slovenian politician, priest, and journalist

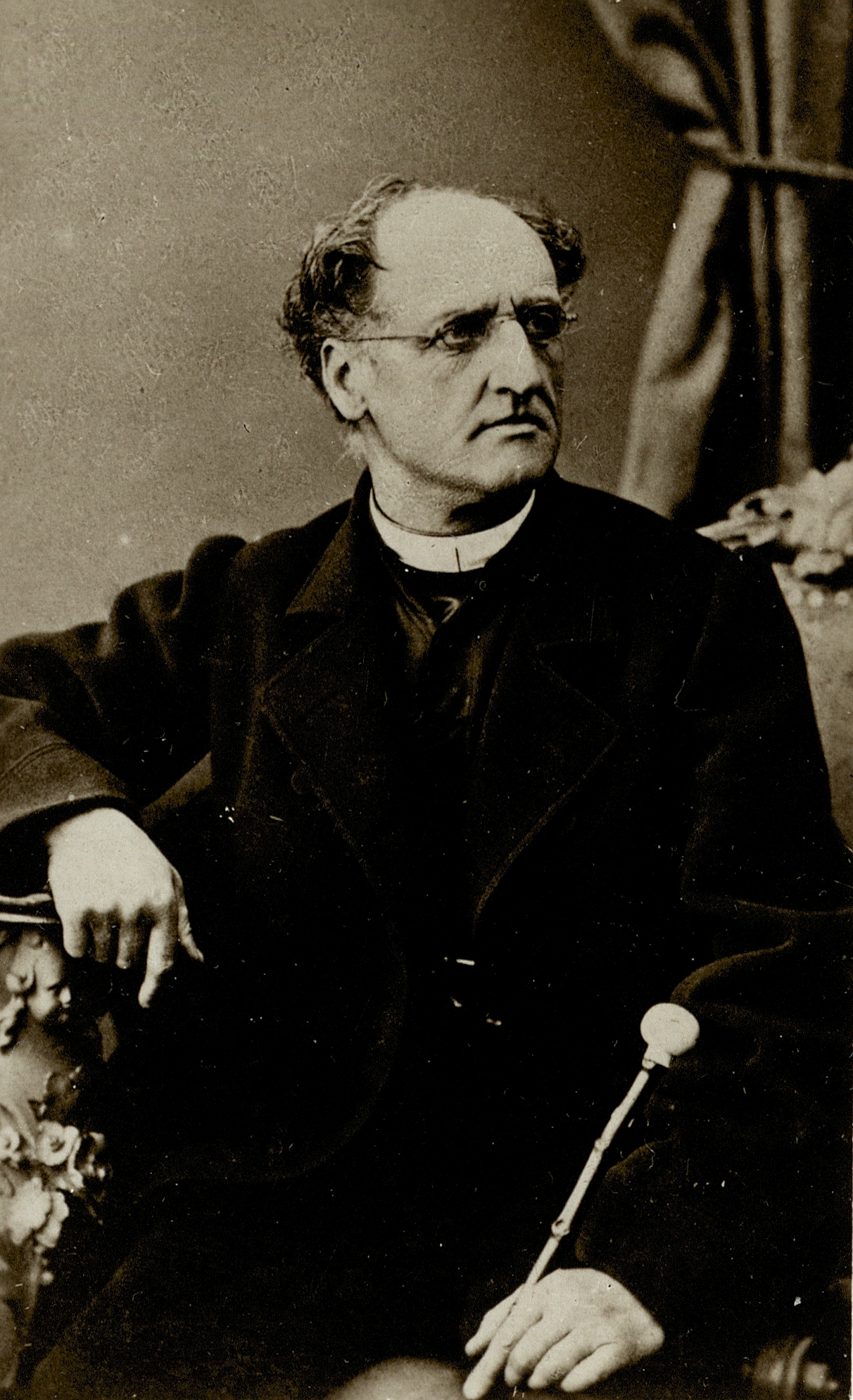
Andrej Einspieler

Andrej Einspieler (13 November 1813 – 16 January 1888) was a Slovene politician, Roman Catholic priest and journalist, and one of the early leaders of the Old Slovene national movement in the 19th century. He was known as the "father of the Carinthian Slovenes".

Einspieler was born in the village of Suetschach (Slovene: Sveče) near Feistritz im Rosental (Slovene: Bistrica v Rožu) in the Duchy of Carinthia. He attended the lyceum and later the theological seminary in Klagenfurt. He served as a priest throughout the Slovene-inhabited areas of southern Carinthia. During the spring of nations of 1848, he collaborated with the fellow Carinthian Slovene priest and political activist Matija Majar and became a fervent advocate of the political program of United Slovenia. In 1851, Einspieler co-founded the Hermagoras Society (Mohorjeva družba), the oldest Slovene publishing house, together with the Carinthian philologist Anton Janežič and the Styrian priest Anton Martin Slomšek. Due to Einspieler's restless cultural and publicist activity, Klagenfurt emerged as the major cultural center of the Slovene national revival in the 1850s.

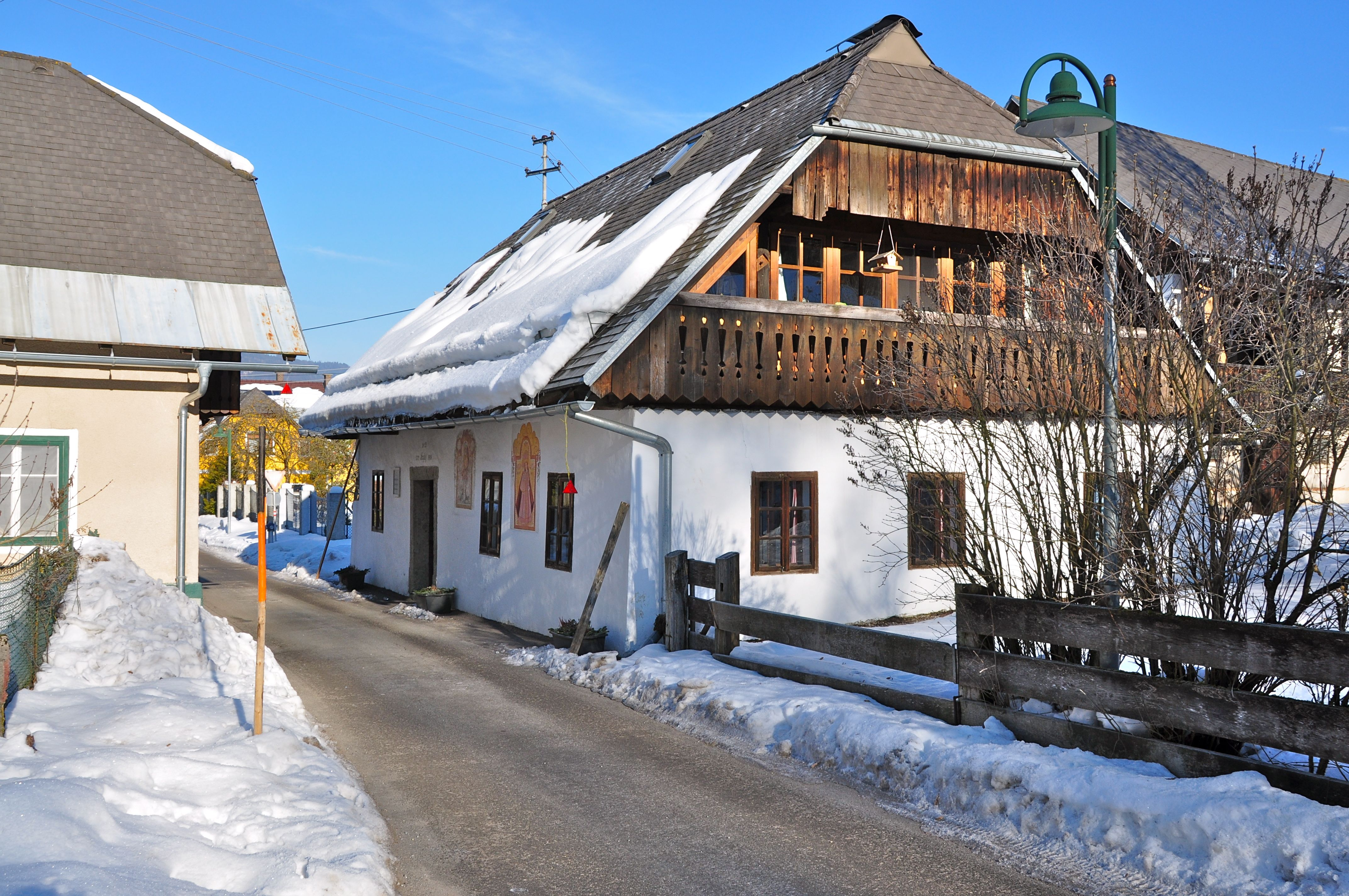
Einspieler's birth house in Suetschach (Sveče) near Feistritz im Rosental (Bistrica v Rožu)

With the beginning of the constitutional period in the Austrian Empire in 1860, Einspieler gradually abandoned the ideal of United Slovenia as unachievable. He wrote numerous articles in German, calling for a collaboration between Slovene and German speakers in Carinthia and in other regions of the Slovene Lands. In 1865, he pushed through initiator the so-called Maribor Program, in which a group of Old Slovenes (a conservative fraction within the Slovene national movement) proposed the re-establishment of Inner Austria, a largely autonomous and federative political unit within the Austrian Empire into which the traditional provinces of Carinthia, Styria, Carniola, and Austrian Littoral would be merged. He launched the newspaper Stimmen aus Innerösterreich (News from Inner Austria), written mainly in German, in order to convince the German-speaking public to accept this idea. However, the program was rejected by both Slovene and ethnic German nationalists. At the beginning of the 1870s, Einspieler was marginalized from the mainstream in Slovene politics, although he continued his political activity. In 1876, he was elected in the Klagenfurt municipal council.

He died in Klagenfurt in 1888.

== Legacy ==
During all his active life, Einspieler fought for the linguistic and political rights of the Carinthian Slovenes. He became known as the "father of Carinthian Slovenes".

In 1979, the Slovene Christian Cultural Association from Carinthia Einspieler Prize established the Einspieler Award, which is given to individuals who have rendered outstanding services to the cause of coexistence among different peoples or nationalities. The prize has been awarded to, among others, the governor of South Tyrol, Luis Durnwalder; scholar and professor at the Central European University, Anton Pelinka; Roman Catholic prelate, Egon Kapellari; and Austrian politician, Rudolf Kirchschläger.

== Sources ==
- Jože Pogačnik, "Andrej Einspieler" in Slovenska misel: eseji o slovenstvu (Ljubljana: Cankarjeva založba, 1987), 436–437.
- KSZ: Andrej Einspieler
- Kočna.at: Andrej Einspieler
