= Vasilij Melik =

Slovenian historian (1921–2009)

Vasilij Melik (17 January 1921 – 28 January 2009) was a Slovenian historian, who mostly worked on political history of the Slovene Lands in the 19th century.

== Life ==
He was born in Ljubljana as the only son of the renowned geographer Anton Melik. After finishing the Ljubljana Classical Lyceum, he enrolled at the University of Ljubljana, where he studied under the supervision of the historian Fran Zwitter.

During World War Two, he was sent to the Gonars concentration camp by the Fascist Italian occupation authorities, and then to a labour camp near Postojna.

After the Italian armistice in September 1943, he was released and returned to Ljubljana, where he graduated from history in 1944. In 1945, he worked shortly as a correspondent for the Yugoslav press agency Tanjug, and then continued the academic career.

== Work ==
Melik's research was focused on the Slovene history of the 19th century. He first dedicated to the economic history, but then shifted to political history, especially history of legal and political institutions. Particularly important is his study on the elections in the Slovene Lands between 1861 and 1918. He also researched history of everyday life, especially of the period of modernization and industrialization of the Slovene countryside in Carniola and Lower Styria.

He was also the editor-in-chief of Zgodovinski časopis, the leading Slovenian historical journal.

In the 1980s, he collaborated with the publishing house Slovenska matica in the critical editions of memoirs by prominent Slovene politicians of the 19th century, including Ivan Hribar and Josip Vošnjak.

He died in Ljubljana.

== Controversy ==
Melik was frequently accused, especially after the democratisation of Slovenia in 1990, that he was too cooperative with the Communist regime. One of the main accusations against Melik was that he was involved in the removal of the Catholic conservative literary historian Anton Slodnjak from the University of Ljubljana because of his alternative interpretations of the history of Slovenian literature. In March 1959, in fact, in midst of an instigated massive denigration campaign against the distinguished scholar, Melik published a long negative critique of Slodnjak's historical interpretations, accusing him of non-scientific and metaphysical approach to literary history. Many, including Melik's colleague historian Bogo Grafenauer, interpreted this gesture as a service to the repressive cultural policies of the Titoist regime.
