= Kmetijske in rokodelske novice =

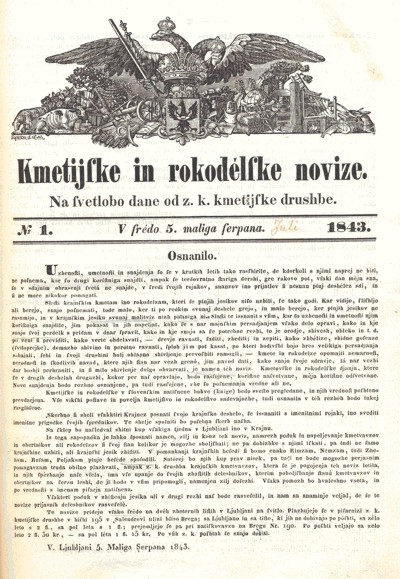
The cover of the newspaper, when it was still written in the old Bohorič alphabet

Kmetijske in rokodelske novice (English: Agricultural and Artisan News), frequently referred to simply as Novice (News), was a Slovene-language newspaper in the 19th century, which had an influential role in the Slovene national revival. For its first two years of publication (1843–1844) the newspaper's name was spelled Kmetijſke in rokodélſke novize (using the Bohorič alphabet), and from 1845 onward Kmetijske in rokodélske novice (using Gaj's Latin alphabet).

It was established in 1843 by the conservative editor Janez Bleiweis, who later became one of the main leaders of the Slovene national movement. Between 1843 and 1852, it was issued on a weekly basis, between 1852 and 1857 two times a week, and after 1857 again once a week. It was edited by Bleiweis until his death in 1881.

Between the 1840s and the 1870s, it was the most influential newspaper in Slovene and, together with the German-language Laibacher Zeitung, the most widespread newspaper in the Slovene Lands. Its role in the cultural formation of the Slovene people was great. The newspaper was crucial in the development of standard Slovene in the mid-19th century, including the introduction of Gaj's Latin alphabet in the 1840s. Matija Majar's manifesto on United Slovenia was first published in the newspaper, as was France Prešeren's poem Zdravljica, the 7th stanza of which would later become the Slovenian national anthem. Many other important Slovene authors wrote in the newspapers, including Fran Levstik, Janez Trdina, Simon Jenko, and Josip Jurčič.

In the beginning, the newspaper was mostly diffused in Carniola, but in the 1850s its readership spread throughout the Slovene Lands. In the early 1860s, it served as the main herald of the Slovene national movement.

With the rise of political differentiation within Slovene nationalism in the late 1860s, and the establishment of two rival daily newspapers, the national liberal Slovenski narod (1868) and the national conservative Slovenec (1873), the influence of Novice declined. After the pluralization of the media scene in the 1880s and 1890s, it became completely marginal, and it ceased publication in 1902.
