= Fran Zwitter =

Slovenian historian

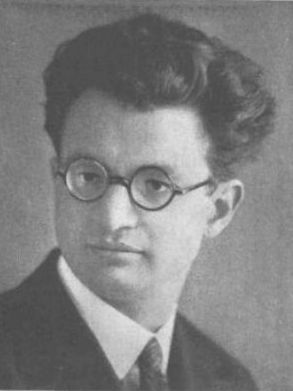
- Zwitter during or before 1939
- Born: 24 October 1905; Bela Cerkev
- Died: 14 April 1988 (aged 82); Ljubljana

Fran Zwitter (24 October 1905 – 14 April 1988) was a Slovenian historian. Together with Milko Kos, Bogo Grafenauer, and Vasilij Melik, he is considered the co-founder of the Ljubljana School of Historiography.

== Life and work ==
He was born in the village of Bela Cerkev near Novo Mesto in what was then the Duchy of Carniola, Austro-Hungarian Empire. He was the son of Martin (a. k. a. Davorin) Zwitter, a Carinthian Slovene judge. After his death in 1918, the family decided to stay in the Kingdom of Yugoslavia (the Carinthian Plebiscite assigned their native region to the Republic of Austria). After finishing grammar school in Novo Mesto, he enrolled at the University of Ljubljana, where he studied history and geography. Between 1926 and 1928, he studied also at the University of Vienna. Between 1930 and 1932, he studied in Paris under the supervision of Albert Mathiez. Between 1932 and 1938, he taught at the Ljubljana Classical Lyceum. In 1938, he became professor at the University of Ljubljana.

In the 1930s, he was active in public life, publishing critical articles in left liberal journals, such as Sodobnost and Ljubljanski zvon. Soon after the Axis invasion of Yugoslavia in April 1941, he joined the Liberation Front of the Slovenian People. In May of the same year, he was arrested by the Italian occupation authorities of the Province of Ljubljana, but released soon afterwards. In March 1942, he was arrested again and sent to the internment camp in Aprica, on the Italian-Swiss border. After the Italian armistice, he found his way back to Slovenia, where he joined the partisan resistance. Between January 1944 and March 1945, he organized and led the Scientific Institute of the Executive Council of the Liberation Front, a unique institution in the Nazi-occupied Europe. The institute mainly prepared documentation on border issues and prepared expertises for the Yugoslav territorial claims against Italy in the Julian March and against Austria in Carinthia. In 1945, he moved to the Yugoslav capital Belgrade, where he worked as an expert on north-western border issues at the Ministry of Foreign Affairs.

After 1948, he moved back to Ljubljana, where he taught at the Department of History of the University of Ljubljana. Between 1952 and 1954, he served as rector of the University. In 1953, he became a member of the Slovenian and later also of the Yugoslav (1961) and the Serbian Academy of Sciences and Arts (1970). Between 1975 and 1978, he served as president of the publishing house Slovenska matica.

Zwitter's initial expertise was the social history of medieval towns, but under the influence of his supervisor Albert Mathiez, he switched to modern history. Under the influence of the French Annales school, he introduced several methodological innovation in the study of the demographic history of the Slovene Lands. After World War II, he turned to the study of nationality issues in the Habsburg Empire.

He died in Ljubljana in 1988, and was buried in the cemetery in Bela Cerkev.

His son Matjaž Zwitter is a physician, his other son, Tomaž Zwitter is an astronomer, and his daughter, Anja Dular is a historian, librarian and social anthropologist.

== Major works ==
- Starejša kranjska mesta in meščanstvo ("The Burgers in the Older Carniolan Towns"). Ljubljana, 1929;
- Les origines de l'illyrisme politique et la création des Provinces illyriennes ("The Origins of Political Illyrism and the Creation of the Illyrian Provinces). Dijon, 1933;
- Les problemes nationaux dans la monarchie des Habsbourg ("National Questions in the Habsburg Monarchy"), co-authored with Jaroslav Šidak and Vaso Bogdanov. Belgrade, 1960;
- Die Kärntner Frage ("The Carinthian Question"). Klagenfurt, 1979;
- O slovenskem narodnem vprašanju ("On the Slovene national question"). Selected articles edited by Vasilij Melik, Ljubljana, 1990.
