= Janez Bleiweis =

Slovenian politician

- Janez vitez Bleiweis pl. Trsteniški
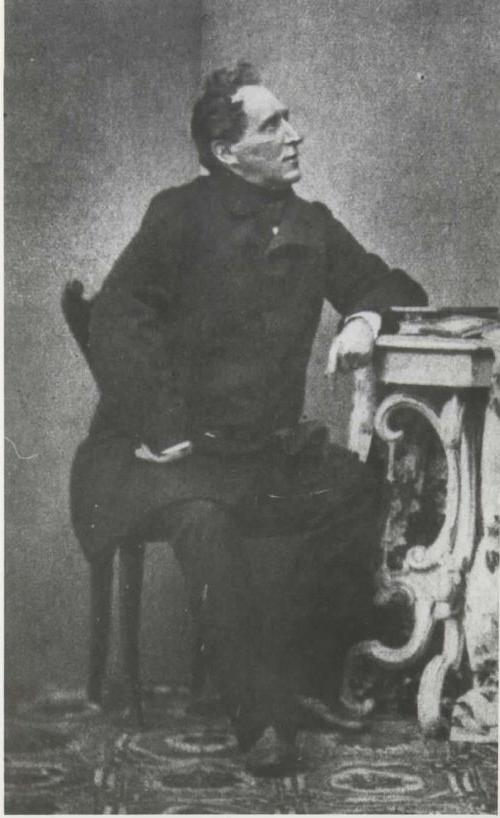
- Born: 19 November 1808; Kranj, Carniola, Slovenia
- Died: 29 November 1881 (aged 73); Ljubljana, Slovenia
- Citizenship: Austro-Hungarian
- Occupations: journalist, doctor, veterinarian, writer, politician, teacher

Janez Bleiweis (19 November 1808 – 29 November 1881) was a Slovene conservative politician, journalist, medical doctor, veterinarian, and public figure. He was the leader of the so-called Old Slovene political movement. Already during his lifetime, he was called father of the nation.

Bleiweis was born in a wealthy merchant family in the Carniolan city of Kranj, then part of the Austrian Empire, and baptized Johann Bleÿweis. From childhood, he was raised in a bilingual environment. He was fluent in both Slovene and Austrian German, as most of the members of the upper middle class in Carniola at the time. He attended the lyceum in Ljubljana before enrolling at the University of Vienna, where he studied medicine. After completing his studies, he worked as a professor of veterinary medicine and pathology in Ljubljana. Bleiweis wrote a number of text from the fields of the veterinary medicine and human health, particularly about infectious diseases.

In 1843, Bleiweis founded the journal Kmetijske in rokodelske novice (Farmers' and Craftsmen's News) and edited it until his death in 1881. It dealt with economic, as well as with cultural issues in the Slovene Lands. In the spring of nations of 1848, he became involved in politics and supported the quest of United Slovenia. At the beginning of the constitutional period in the Austrian Empire, Bleiweis emerged as the leader of the Slovene national movement. Already in the late 1850s, however, his politically conservatitive leadership was challenged by the younger generation of Slovene nationalists, known as the Young Slovenes, among whom were Fran Levstik, Josip Stritar, and Josip Jurčič. Bleiweis' group, which included Lovro Toman, Etbin Henrik Costa, Luka Svetec and Andrej Einspieler was identified as the Old Slovenes thereafter, although they themselves never accepted such a name.

Bleiweis was a Habsburg legitimist and follower of the Austroslavist ideology. In politics, he followed the example of the Czech leader František Palacký, who demanded autonomy for the Slavic peoples within a unified Austrian Empire.

In 1881, Bleiweis was granted knighthood by Franz Joseph I of Austria, the Emperor of Austria. The same year, he died in Ljubljana and was buried in the St. Christopher Cemetery in the Bežigrad district of Ljubljana.

== Sources ==
- Jože Pogačnik, "Janez Bleiweis" in Slovenska misel: eseji o slovenstvu (Ljubljana: Cankarjeva založba, 1987), 437-438
