= Fran Levstik =

Slovenian writer

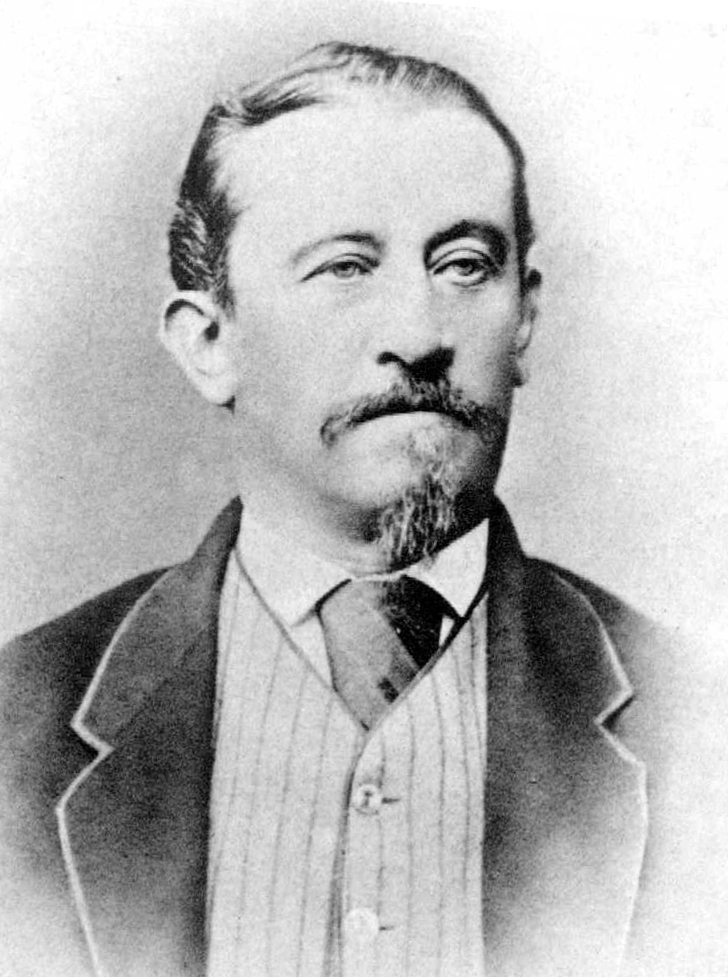
- Born: 28 September 1831; Dolnje Retje, Carniola, Austrian Empire (now Slovenia)
- Died: 16 November 1887 (aged 56); Ljubljana, Carniola, Austria-Hungary (now Slovenia)
- Occupation: Writer

Fran Levstik (28 September 1831 – 16 November 1887) was a Slovene writer, political activist, playwright and critic. He was one of the most prominent exponents of the Young Slovene political movement.

== Life and work ==
Levstik was born in 1831 in Dolnje Retje (now part of the municipality of Velike Lašče) in Lower Carniola (then part of the Austrian Empire, today in Slovenia) in a peasant Slovene family.

Levstik was the first notable writer of Slovene epic prose. Among his most known works are the short tale Martin Krpan From Vrh (Slovene: Martin Krpan z Vrha), which became a classic work of Slovene literature, and the itinerary A Journey from Litija to Čatež (Popotovanje iz Litije do Čateža), the main objective of which is a literary manifesto. In the critical essay Napake slovenskega pisanja, he exposed his views on the development of the Slovene literary language.

Levstik was one of the main exponents of the Young Slovenes, a progressive and radical political group akin to the Young Czechs in the Czech Lands that challenged the then prevailing influence of conservatives, led by Janez Bleiweis, within the Slovenian National Movement. In his late years, he grew closer to Pan-Slavist ideals.

Levstik and his literary program had a great influence on future generations of Slovene authors of national liberal views, especially Josip Jurčič, Josip Stritar, Janko Kersnik, Anton Aškerc, Janez Trdina and Ivan Tavčar.

The Slovene composer Breda Šček set Levstik’s texts to music.

He died of Bright's disease (nephritis) in Ljubljana after a period of serious mental illness, which included delusions of a religious nature. He was buried in the former St. Christopher's Cemetery in the Bežigrad district of Ljubljana.

The Levstik Award for achievements in children's literature is named after him.
