= Flag of Slovenia =

Republic of Slovenia
- Use: National flag and naval ensign
- Proportion: 1:2
- Adopted: 25 June 1991; 35 years ago
- Design: A horizontal tricolor of white, blue, and red; charged with the coat of arms at the hoist side
- Designed by: Marko Pogačnik
- Flag using RGB

The national flag of Slovenia (Slovene: zastava Slovenije) features three equal horizontal bands of white (top), blue, and red, with the coat of arms of Slovenia located in the upper hoist side of the flag centred in the white and blue bands. The coat of arms is a shield with the image of Mount Triglav, Slovenia's highest peak, in white against a blue background at the centre; beneath it are two wavy blue lines representing the Adriatic Sea and local rivers, and above it are three six-pointed golden stars arranged in an inverted triangle which are taken from the coat of arms of the Counts of Celje, the great Slovene dynastic house of the late 14th and early 15th centuries.

The Slovenian flag's colours are considered to be pan-Slavic, but they actually come from the medieval coat of arms of the Holy Roman Empire's duchy of Carniola, consisting of 3 stars, a mountain, and three colours (red, blue, yellow), crescent. The existing Slovene tricolour was raised for the first time in history during the Revolution of 1848 by the Slovene Romantic nationalist activist and poet Lovro Toman on 7 April 1848, in Ljubljana, in response to a German flag which was raised on top of Ljubljana Castle. Similar colors and designs make up other Slavic flags, particularly the flag of Slovakia.

The civil and state ensign for ships has the same design as the national flag, but a different shape (2:3 instead of 1:2). Boats up to 24 metres (79 ft) use the national flag as an ensign. The naval jack uses colours of the coat of arms, a white, blue, and yellow horizontal tricolour.

== Historical development ==
=== Origins ===
1:2 Flag of the Slovene nation, first flown during the spring of nations of 1848.

The white-blue-red Slovene flag was first raised on 7 April 1848, on a building between Congress Square and Prešeren Square in Ljubljana, by a group of nationally minded students led by the prominent liberal nationalist activist and poet Lovro Toman. Despite opposition from the local ethnic Germans it was subsequently recognized by the Austrian Government as the official flag of Carniola. This formal recognition, albeit on a regional level, was an exception to the policy of the Austrian Government which tended to persecute national symbols of the non-German nationalities in the Empire.

In addition, Austrian authorities saw all tricolors as basically nationalist and potentially revolutionary symbols, so Austrian provinces (as the Empire itself) were only allowed to use bicolors (the only exception being the flag of the Kingdom of Croatia and Slavonia, since it was interpreted to be a combination of the Croatian and Slavonian bicolors). So the official recognition of the Carniolan white-blue-red tricolor instead of the traditional white-blue bicolor was seen as a major achievement by the Slovenes and it quickly became the symbol representing the idea of United Slovenia. In the second half of the 19th century, the Slovene national tricolor became the only truly all-Slovene symbol, representing all Slovenes, regardless of the historical region in which they lived.

The tricolor flag continued to be associated with Slovenia during the country's incorporation into Yugoslavia, although officially the whole kingdom including Slovenia had the same flag, in this case, the blue-white-red. In the interwar period, it was also used by the Slovenes of the Julian March that were annexed to Italy, where it was prohibited and persecuted by the fascist regime.

=== Slovene flags during and after WWII ===
During World War II The Slovene national colors were used both by the Partisan Resistance Movement (usually with a red star in the middle) and by the Slovene Home Guard, the voluntary anti-Communist militia sponsored and supported by the Nazi German occupation forces.

In 1945 a red star was officially placed on the flag of the Socialist Republic of Slovenia, a constituent of the Socialist Yugoslavia.

1:2 Flag used by Slovene Home Guard 1941–1945.

1:2 Flag used by Slovene Partisans that was adopted on 26 September 1941 at the Stolice meeting of the Yugoslav Partisans.

1:2 Flag of SR Slovenia, 1945–1991.

=== Flag of independent Slovenia ===
Following Slovene independence from Yugoslavia, the red star was removed and the new coat of arms by Marko Pogačnik was added. The flag was officially adopted on 27 June 1991, following a long and controversial dispute about the coat of arms of the new Republic.

Slovenian police officers raise the flag

Flag at Lake Bled

Flag in Ljubljana

== Design ==
Flag construction sheet

Scheme	White	Blue	Red	Yellow
RGB	255, 255, 255 (#FFFFFF)	0, 0, 255 (#0000FF)	255, 0, 0 (#FF0000)	255, 255, 0 (#FFFF00)
CMYK	0, 0, 0, 0	100, 100, 0, 0	0, 100, 100, 0	0, 0, 100, 0
SCOTDIC Code 777 — Int'l Colour Codification System (2034)	N1 N95	N46 N722509	N23 N074014	N6 N197512
Pantone	000 (#FFF)	293 (#003DA5)	199 (#D50032)	116 (#FFCD00)
Source: "Uradni list Republike Slovenije" (PDF). Archived from the original (PDF) on 2009-06-19.; "National symbols". Government of Slovenia.; "2012 Olympics Flags and anthems manual" (PDF).

== Government (maritime) flags ==
These flags are used on naval vessels only.

Flag	Use	Description
	President of Slovenia	A white field with a tricolor border in white, blue and red. The national coat of arms is at the center.
	President of the National Assembly of Slovenia	A red field with a blue border, with the national coat of arms at the center.
	Prime Minister of Slovenia	A blue field with a red border, with the national coat of arms at the center.
	Minister of Defence of Slovenia	A crimson field with an azure border, in the center is the Slovenian Army emblem.
	Chief of the General Staff of Slovenia	An azure field with a crimson border, the center contains the Slovenian Army emblem.

=== Naval jacks ===
Flag	Date	Use	Description
	1995–1996	Naval jack of Slovenia	A navy blue field with the national coat of arms in the center
	1996–present	Naval jack of Slovenia	A horizontal tricolor of white, blue, yellow.

== Other flags ==
Flag	Use	Description
	Civil ensign	The national flag in 2:3 proportion.
	Flag of the Slovenian Armed Forces	A horizontal tricolor of white, blue, and red, with the Slovenian Army emblem in the center. Surrounding it in gold (in Slovene) reads "Republic of Slovenia; Slovene Army".

== See also ==
- List of Slovenian flags
- Flag of Slovakia
