= Lovro Toman =

Slovene revolutionary

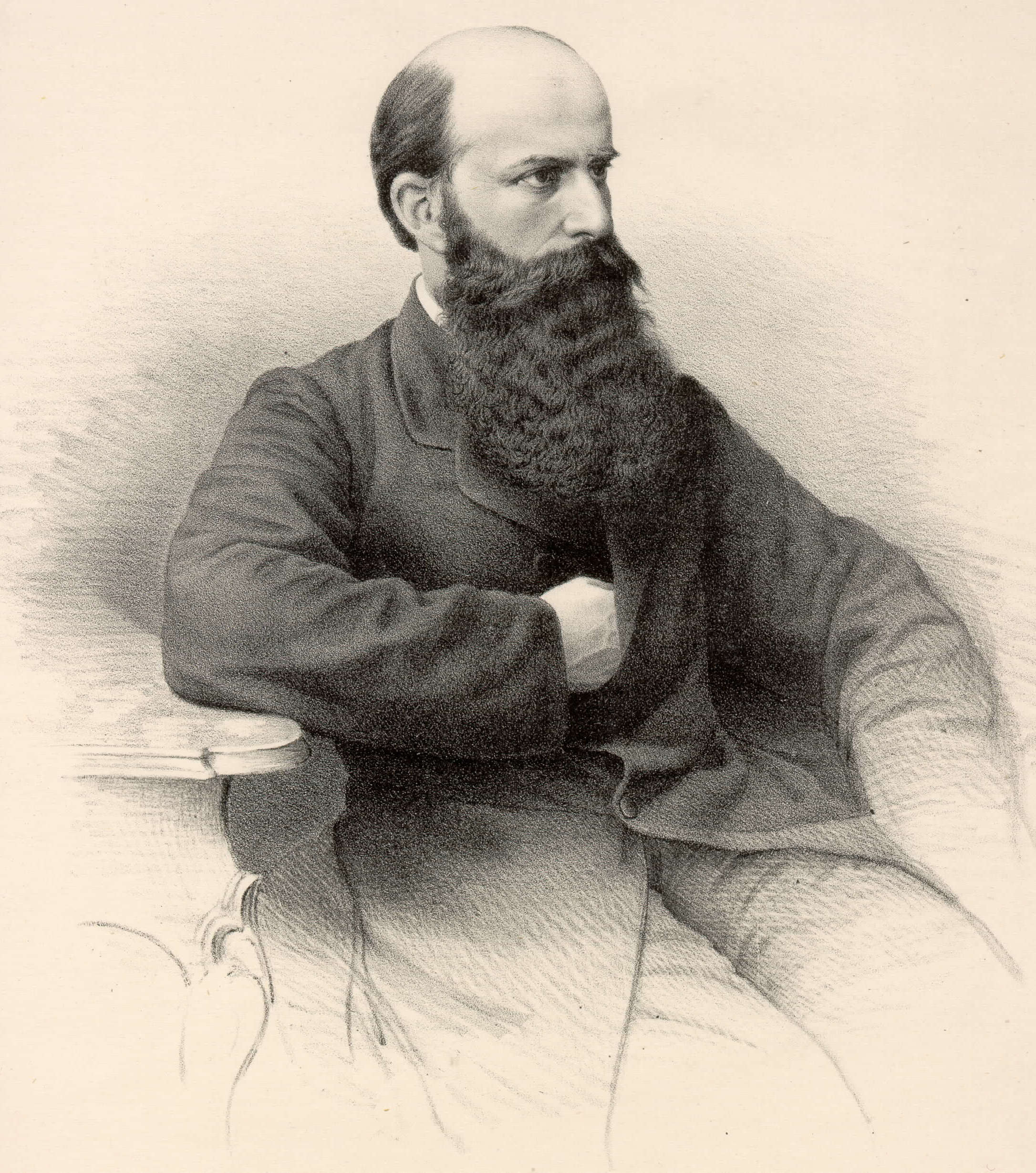
Lovro Toman in the 1860s

Lovro Toman (10 August 1827 – 15 August 1870) was a Slovene Romantic nationalist revolutionary activist during the Revolution of 1848, known as the person who in Ljubljana, at the Wolf Street 8, raised the Slovene tricolor for the first time in history in response to a German flag raised on top of the Ljubljana Castle. Later he helped founding one of the first Slovene publishing houses, the Slovenska matica. He was a Slovene national conservative politician and member of the Austrian Parliament. Together with Janez Bleiweis and Etbin Henrik Costa, he was part of the leadership of the Old Slovene party.

== Life ==
He was born in a wealthy entrepreneurial family in the Upper Carniolan village of Kamna Gorica, in what was then the Austrian Empire, present-day Slovenia.

After graduating from the classical lyceum in Ljubljana in 1845, he enrolled at the University of Vienna, where he studied law. During his student years, he became influenced by Romantic nationalist ideas. He rose to prominence as a political activist during the Revolution of 1848.

In April 1848, he was among the students who first raised the Slovenian flag in the center of Ljubljana. After the revolution, he continued his studies and graduated from the University of Graz.

In 1853, he married the poet Josipina Urbančič Turnograjska, who came from one of the wealthiest families in Carniola. The two lived in Graz until her early death in 1854.

He died in Rondaun near Vienna, and was buried in his native village of Kamna Gorica.

== Political career ==
After his wife's death he moved to Radovljica, where he worked as a lawyer.

In 1861, he was elected to the Austrian Parliament. In the 1860s, he became one of the most powerful leaders of the conservative Old Slovene party, together with Janez Bleiweis, Luka Svetec, and Etbin Henrik Costa.

He was also considered among the most popular Slovene politicians in the 19th century. He was known for his vigorous temperament and for his many public functions. Among other things, he was the founder of the Slovenska matica publishing house and served as its first chairman. His overwhelming influence in the political decision-making in the Slovene National Movement was frequently criticized by his opponents, who sometimes mockingly referred to Carniola as "Tomania".

== Controversies ==
In 1867, he was involved in a scandal around the construction of the railway line between Ljubljana and Tarvisio. He was accused by his opponents of having sold out his vote in favour of the Austro-Hungarian compromise, which he had previously opposed, in order to achieve the license for the construction of the railway line. These charges were probably unsubstantiated.
