= October Diploma =

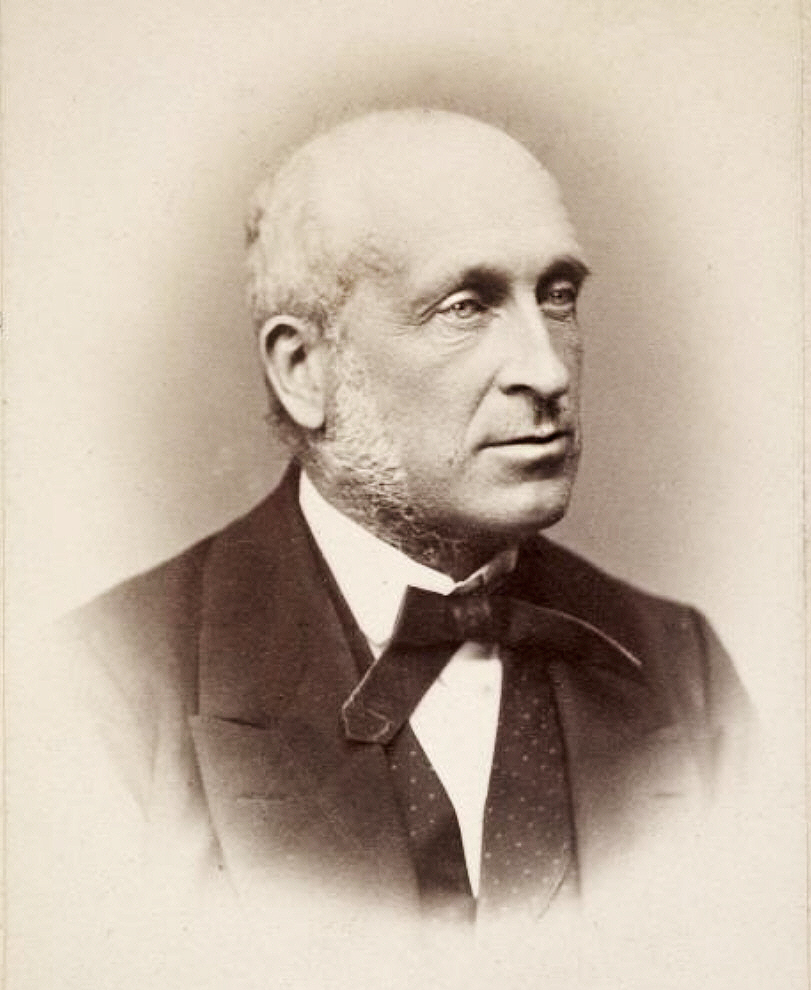
Author of the October Diploma, Agenor Gołuchowski

The October Diploma was a constitution of the Austrian Empire adopted by Habsburg Emperor Franz Joseph on 20 October 1860. The Diploma was written by the Minister of Interior, Agenor Gołuchowski. It attempted to increase the power of the conservative nobles by giving them more power over their own lands through a program of aristocratic federalism. This policy was a failure almost from the start, and Franz Joseph was forced to make further concessions in the February Patent of 1861. Even so, historians have argued that the October Diploma began the "constitutional" period of the empire.

== Causes ==
In 1860, Franz Josef and the Austrian Habsburg Empire were "threatened with a crisis of existence". 1856 had begun a period of diplomatic isolation following the defeat of Russia, a key Austrian ally, in the Crimean War. The Second Italian War of Independence had ended in 1859 with an Austrian defeat at the hands of Napoleon III, and Franz Josef was forced to cede Lombardy to the French. These losses worsened the already weak state of the Austrian economy and exposed the weaknesses of the empire's bureaucracy. Both liberals and conservatives were anxious for reform after a decade of near absolutist rule, while Hungarians and Czechs wanted greater autonomy over their own affairs.

In March 1860, Franz Josef asked the Imperial Parliament, or Reichsrat, to advise the emperor on matters of reform. The Reichsrat, composed almost entirely of conservative aristocrats, naturally recommended a reconstruction of the empire based on the principles of aristocratic federalism. Their report was ignored by Franz Josef, but by the end of the year, he would adopt the principles of aristocratic federalism in his own document.

It was the realities of foreign policy that led the emperor to adopt the conservatives’ ideas. He hoped to establish a Holy Alliance with Tsar Alexander II of Russia and King William I of Prussia and believed that a strongly conservative domestic policy would be an advantage in the upcoming negotiations. He demanded that a constitution be written within a week and settled the general principles of the document during a train stop en route to the conference.

== Results ==
Historian A.J.P. Taylor called the Diploma a victory for the Old Conservative nobility. The Habsburg government was reorganized on a federal basis, and the provincial diets were given the power to cooperatively pass laws with the Emperor and the Reichsrat. In a concession to the liberals, the membership of the Reichsrat was increased by over a hundred new members. However, the Diploma called for the Reichsrat to meet very infrequently, and its jurisdiction covered only part of the empire. The provincial diets were packed with the landed aristocracy, thus giving them more direct power over their own lands. Hungary was given special status in the Reichsrat through a provision that called for non-Hungarian delegates to meet separately from the whole body to discuss non-Hungarian matters. This, however, fell far short of the Hungarian leaders' desire for greater autonomy and recognition.

Almost immediately after the Diploma was passed, it became clear that it would not last long. The empire's finances continued to fail, further showing the weaknesses of the current administration. Prussia and the German Confederation began to sense a weakness in the monarchy that could be exploited, while Hungarians were furious with the few reforms they had been given. Additionally, the Tsar disapproved of granting a Federal Constitution to Galicia.

In the end, it was the German liberals who were eventually able to effect change. These liberals made up a substantial number of the most powerful bureaucrats and, while they often opposed the Emperor, they were supporters of a strong centralized state instead of a weak, federalized one. Through their influence, the Emperor was pressured into appointing the liberal Anton von Schmerling as Secretary of State in December. Von Schmerling took to rewriting the October Diploma, and in February 1861, the Emperor adopted the February Patent.

== Sources ==
- Jelavich, Barbara. The Habsburg Empire in European Affairs, 1814–1909. Chicago: Rand McNally and Company, 1969.
- Okey, Robin. Habsburg Monarchy c. 1765–1918. New York: Palgrave MacMillan, 2002.
- Taylor, A.J.P. Habsburg Monarchy 1809–1918. Hamish Hamilton: London, 1951.
