= United Slovenia =

Irredentism

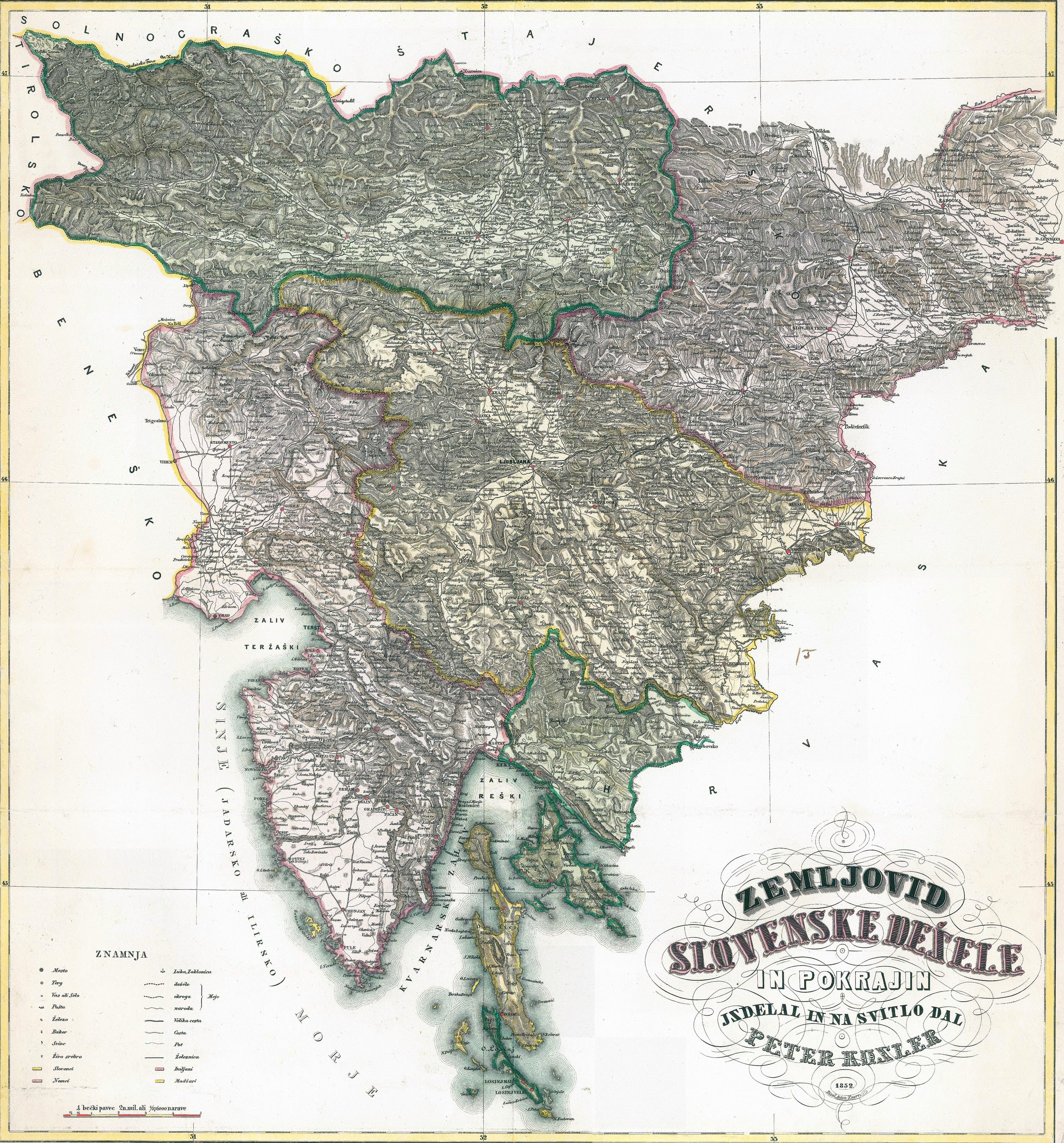
Peter Kosler's Map of the Slovene Land and Provinces, designed during the Spring of Nations in 1848, became the symbol of United Slovenia.

United Slovenia (Slovene: Zedinjena Slovenija or Združena Slovenija) is the name originally given to an unrealized political programme of the Slovene national movement, formulated during the Spring of Nations in 1848. The programme demanded (a) unification of all the Slovene-inhabited areas into one single kingdom under the rule of the Austrian Empire, (b) equal rights of Slovene in public, and (c) strongly opposed the planned integration of the Habsburg monarchy with the German Confederation. The programme failed to meet its main objectives, but it remained the common political program of all currents within the Slovene national movement until World War I.

== Historical context ==
Following the Vienna Rebellion that forced Ferdinand I to abolish feudalism and adopt a constitution, many nations of the Austrian Empire saw a chance for strengthening their ideas. After the Congress of Vienna in 1815, for the first time in centuries, all Slovenes were under the rule of one emperor. They were, however, divided between different political subdivisions, namely the provinces of Carniola, Styria, Carinthia, Gorizia and Gradisca, Istria, Trieste, Lombardy and Venetia (the Venetian Slovenia) and the Kingdom of Hungary (Prekmurje). In such a fragmentation, a self-government on national basis was impossible.

The programme of United Slovenia was first formulated on 17 March 1848 by the Carinthian Slovene priest and political activist Matija Majar, and published on 29 March in the national conservative newspaper Kmetijske in rokodelske novice, edited by Janez Bleiweis. The idea advanced by Majar was elaborated and articulated by the society of Slovenes from Vienna, led at this time by the notable linguist Franz Miklosich, which published their manifesto on 29 April in the Slovene newspaper Novice from Klagenfurt. In the same period, the geographer Peter Kosler issued a map of the Slovene-inhabited areas with ethnic-linguistic lines.

Janez Bleiweis presented these demands to the Austrian Emperor's younger brother Archduke John, who had been living among the Slovenes in Maribor for 15 years. The three key points of the programme (the creation of Slovenia as a distinct entity, recognition of Slovene and opposition to joining the German Confederation) were signed as a petition. 51 signed sheets still exist, showing that the programme was well-supported by the masses. The signed petition was presented to the Austrian parliament; however, due to the uprising in Hungary, the Parliament was dissolved before it could even discuss the Slovene issue.

== Aftermath ==
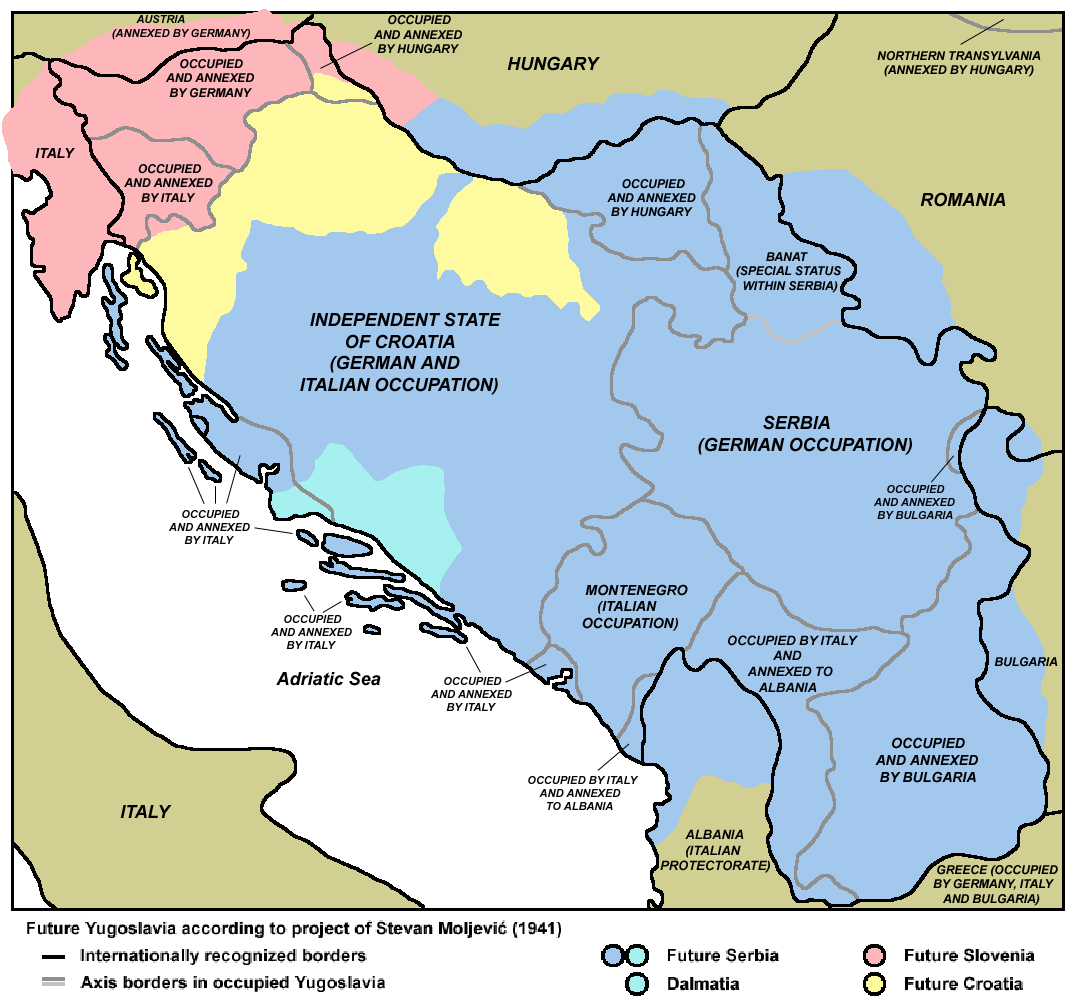
During the Second World War, the Chetnik leader Stevan Moljević idealized a plan in which Serbia and Slovenia would substantially enlarge their territories and fulfill their territorial claims after liberation from Axis forces.

The political aspirations of the Slovenes were suppressed by Baron Alexander von Bach's absolutism in 1851, and the Slovene national movement was moved back to an almost purely the cultural field. The programme of United Slovenia, however, remained the common political programme of all currents within the Slovene national movement until World War I, and was gaining power in the period of tabori between 1868 and 1871. After the war and the dissolution of Austria-Hungary, the programme was partially replaced by the idea of integration with other South Slavs in the common country of Yugoslavia.

After the collapse of the Austro-Hungarian Empire in October 1918, and the subsequent creation of first the State of Slovenes, Croats and Serbs and then the Kingdom of Serbs, Croats and Slovenes, a significant number of Slovenes, mostly in the Julian March and Carinthia, remained outside the country. Therefore, the programme of United Slovenia remained very much present in the political and intellectual debates of the interwar period. In April 1941, it was incorporated in the manifesto of the Liberation Front of the Slovenian People. After the annexation of the Slovenian Littoral to Yugoslavia in 1947 and the partition of the Free Territory of Trieste between Italy and Yugoslavia in 1954, the main demand of the United Slovenia programme – the unification of the majority of Slovene-inhabited areas into a unified and autonomous political-administrative entity – saw its fulfillment.

The Post of Slovenia issued a stamp on the occasion of 150th anniversary of the United Slovenia movement.

== List of territory claimed ==
Besides Slovenia itself, the territories claimed by the programme includes:

In modern Austria:

- Carinthia
- parts of Styria up to Wildon or whole Styria

In modern Croatia:

- Rijeka and Primorje-Gorski Kotar County
- Majority of Northern Croatia
- Istria County

In modern Italy:

- Trieste and Gulf of Trieste
- Friuli

In modern Hungary:

- Southern parts of Vas and Zala counties

== See also ==
- Romantic nationalism
- History of Slovenia
- Flag of Slovenia
- Zdravljica
- National symbols of Slovenia
- Republic of Prekmurje
- Slovene March (Kingdom of Hungary)

== Sources ==
- Bogo Grafenauer et al., eds. "Slovenski državnopravni programi 1848–1918", in Slovenci in država. Ljubljana, 1995.
- Stane Granda, Prva odločitev Slovencev za Slovenijo. Ljubljana: Nova revija, 1999.
- Peter Kovačič Peršin, ed., 150 let programa Zedinjene Slovenije. Ljubljana: Društvo 2000, 2000.
- Vasilij Melik, "Ideja Zedinjene Slovenije 1848–1991", in Slovenija 1848–1998: iskanje lastne poti. Stane Granda and Barbara Šatej, eds. Ljubljana, 1998..
- Janko Prunk, Slovenski narodni programi: Narodni programi v slovenski politični misli od 1848 do 1945. Ljubljana, 1986.
- Fran Zwitter, O slovenskem narodnem vprašanju, edited by Vasilij Melik. Ljubljana, 1990.
