= National Progressive Party (Carniola) =

National Progressive Party Narodno napredna stranka
- Leader: Ivan Tavčar; Ivan Hribar
- Founded: 1894
- Dissolved: 1919
- Merged into: Yugoslav Democratic Party
- Ideology: Liberalism

The National Progressive Party (Slovene: Narodno napredna stranka) was a political party in the Carniola region of Austria-Hungary. It was established in 1894 by Ivan Tavčar as the National Party of Carniola (Narodna stranka za Kranjsko); it was renamed The National Progressive Party in 1905. It continued to operate under this name until after the First World War, when it merged with the National Party of Styria (Narodna Stranka za Štajersko) into the Yugoslav Democratic Party, only to be incorporated into the pan-Yugoslav State Party of Serbian, Croatian and Slovene Democrats (Serbo-Croatian: Državnotvorna stranka demokrata Srba, Hrvata i Slovenaca) less than a year later.

The National Progressive Party adopted a liberal nationalist political stance and had a clear majority in the municipal council of Ljubljana-Laibach during the 1880s.
