= Albin Prepeluh =

Slovene politician

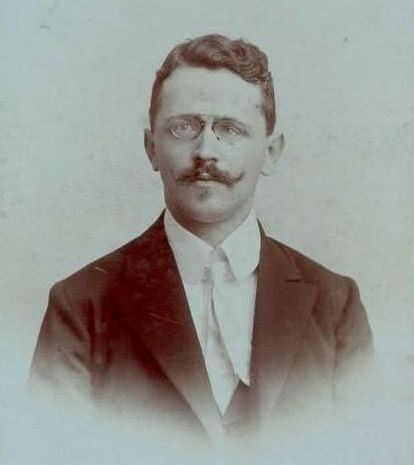
Albin Prepeluh in the 1910s

Albin Prepeluh (22 February 1881 – 20 November 1937) was a Slovenian left wing politician, journalist, editor, political theorist and translator. Before World War I, he was the foremost Slovene Marxist revisionist theoretician. After the War, he became one of the most persistent advocates of Slovenian autonomy within the Kingdom of Yugoslavia, and, together with Dragotin Lončar, the ideologist of the democratic reformist faction of Slovenian Social Democrats. In the late 1920s, he evolved towards agrarianism. He was also known under the pseudonym Abditus.

== Life ==
He was born in a working-class family in Ljubljana, in what was then the Duchy of Carniola. Before World War One, he worked as a clerk of the Austro-Hungarian administration in various Carniolan towns. After the disintegration of the Austro-Hungarian Empire and the proclamation of the State of Slovenes, Croats and Serbs, he became employed in the Slovenian Commission for Social Welfare, where he worked under the supervision of the Christian Socialist thinker Andrej Gosar. This was the only public political office he ever held in his life.

After 1919, he worked as an editor in the prestigious Blasnik Publishing House, one of the oldest publishing houses in the Slovene Lands, dating to early 19th century. In 1920, he became its owner, renamed it to University Publishing House, and transformed it into one of the most prestigious academic publishing houses in Yugoslavia. In the mid-1920s, he also became an editor in the publishing house Slovenska matica, led by his friend Dragotin Lončar.

He died in Ljubljana at the age of 56.

== Political career ==
Already at a young age, Prepeluh became influenced by Marxist and autonomist ideas. In 1902, he corresponded with the German Marxist theoretician Karl Kautsky on the possibilities to activate the peasantry in favour of socialism. The same year, he founded the journal Naši zapiski ('Our Notes'), in which he propagated radical socialist reformism. The journal soon became the herald of young Slovene reformist Social Democrats, which included Anton Dermota, Dragotin Lončar, and Josip Ferfolja.

In 1904, Prepeluh became a member of the Yugoslav Social Democratic Party. He soon entered in conflict with the party's mainstream. Prepeluh rejected the official Austromarxist orientation of the party, and soon entered in confrontation with the party leader Etbin Kristan. Differently from Kristan, Prepeluh endorsed the Bersteinian critique of Marx; he also supported the quest for territorial autonomy of the South Slav peoples against the official Social Democrat support for a purely cultural autonomy.

During this time, Prepeluh became a close friend and collaborator of the Social democratic author Ivan Cankar. They both shared a similar personalist and autonomist vision of socialism, and they both opposed the gradual cultural and linguistic assimilation of all South Slavs, officially supported by the Yugoslav Social Democratic Party.

After 1908, Prepeluh developed a friendly relationship with the Christian Social politician Janez Evangelist Krek, who unsuccessfully tried to persuade him to leave the Social Democratic Party and join the Slovene People's Party. Prepeluh remained in the Social Democratic Party, but in the following years he grew closer to Christianity. In 1910, he rose in defense of the "popular faith" against the prevailing Anti-Catholicism of Slovene liberals and social democrats, and criticised the prolongation of the Kulturkampf in the Slovene Lands.

In 1917, Prepeluh became the leader of the internal opposition against the main current of the Yugoslav Social Democratic Party, which continued to put the social question before the issue of national emancipation. In 1918, with the creation of the State of Slovenes, Croats and Serbs, Prepeluh rose to the leadership of the party. He was the leader of its right wing in a sharp confrontation against the left wing, represented by Dragotin Gustinčič, Anton Štebi and Rudolf Golouh. He was in favour of collaboration with the Democratic Party and supported the social-liberal coalition government of Ljubomir Davidović.

After the Yugoslav Social Democratic Party, which was a preponderately Slovenian organization, merged with the Centrumaši and formed the Socialist Party of Yugoslavia in 1921, Prepeluh became marginalized. In 1920, he and Dragotin Lončar re-founded the journal Naši zapiski. They both opposed the centralist program of the new unified Yugoslav Socialist party, and called for a territorial autonomy of Slovenia within Yugoslavia. In 1921, he was one of the proponents of the influential Autonomist Declaration, in which the majority of the most important Slovene intellectuals voiced their support for Slovenian autonomy.

In 1924, Prepeluh and Lončar founded the Slovenian Agrarian Labour Party, which soon merged with the small Slovenian Republican Party into the Slovenian Labour Agrarian Republican Party. The party established close connections with the Croatian Peasant Party. In 1926, it merged with the Independent Agrarian Party, into the Slovenian Peasant Party, of which Prepeluh became the main ideologist.

After the party was dissolved with the establishment of the dictatorship of king Alexander I of Yugoslavia in 1929, Prepeluh retrieved from public life.

== Work ==
Prepeluh wrote many political treatises. His first major work was Občina in socializem (The Commune and Socialism, 1903), in which he articulated an autonomist vision of socialism. Influenced by Tomáš Garrigue Masaryk, he wrote the essay Problemi malega naroda (Problems of a Small Nation). In the book Idejni predhodniki današnjega socijalizma in komunizma (Ideological Precursors of Contemporary Socialism and Communism, 1925), he stressed the difference between the democratic and emancipatory versions of socialism and totalitarian Bolshevism. In Pripombe k naši prevratni dobi (Observations on Our Revolutionary Era), written shortly before his death and published posthumously in 1938, he reflected on the significance of the dissolution of the Austro-Hungarian Empire and the creation of Yugoslavia, reasserting his belief in the Yugoslav project.

He also wrote several historical works, among them Reformacija in socialni boji slovenskih kmetov (The Reformation and the Social Struggle of the Slovenian Peasants, 1908), and Kmetski pokret med Slovenci po prvi svetovni vojni (The Peasant Movement among the Slovenes after World War One, 1928).

He also translated Machiavelli's The Prince into Slovene (published as Vladar).
