= Šentvid =

Šentvid may refer to:

In Austria:

- Sankt Veit an der Glan, known as Šentvid ob Glini in Slovene

In Italy:

- San Vito al Torre, known as Šentvid na Teru in Slovene

In Slovenia:

- Podnanos, a settlement in the Municipality of Vipava, known as Šentvid before 1952
- Šentvid District, a district of the city of Ljubljana
- Šentvid, Ljubljana, a former settlement in the city of Ljubljana
- Šentvid pri Grobelnem, a settlement in the Municipality of Šmarje pri Jelšah
- Šentvid pri Lukovici, a settlement in the Municipality of Lukovica
- Šentvid pri Planini, a settlement in the Municipality of Šentjur
- Šentvid pri Stični, a settlement in the Municipality of Ivančna Gorica
- Šentvid pri Zavodnju, a settlement the Municipality of Šoštanj
