= Josip Vilfan =

Slovenian politician and human rights activist

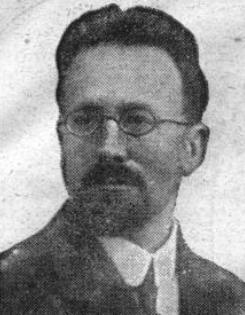
Vilfan Josip

Josip Vilfan or Wilfan (30 August 1878 – 8 March 1955) was a Slovene lawyer, politician, and human rights activist from Trieste. In the early 1920s, he was one of the political leaders of the Slovene and Croatian minority in the Italian-administered Julian March. Together with Engelbert Besednjak, Lavo Čermelj and Ivan Marija Čok, he was the most influential representative of the Slovene émigrés from the Slovenian Littoral during the 1930s. Next to Leonid Pitamic and Boris Furlan, Vilfan is considered one of the most important Slovene legal theorists of the first half of the 20th century.

== Early career ==
He was born as Josip Wilfan in a Slovene-speaking upper middle class in Trieste, which was then the largest port of the Austro-Hungarian Empire (now in Italy). His father was a renowned civil engineer. Josip attended a private Slovene language elementary school in Trieste. When he was a teenager, his father moved to the Dalmatian coastal town of Dubrovnik, where Josip finished a Croatian language high school. He studied law at the University of Vienna, graduating in 1901. He moved back to Trieste, initially working as an assistant in the law firm of the Istrian Croatian national liberal politician Matko Laginja, before opening his own law firm.

Since his youth, Vilfan was member of the progressive nationalist athletic organization Sokol. In Vienna, he became acquainted with socialist and radical democratic ideals. He was also highly influenced by the social theories of Enlightenment thinkers such as Montesquieu, Lessing, Diderot, as well as by the Scottish Enlightenment, Latin classics (mostly Cicero and Seneca), and the constitutional thought of the American Founding Fathers.

Upon returning to Trieste, he became actively involved in the public life of the local Slovene community. He became a regular columnist of the newspaper Edinost, the most important journal of the Slovenes in the Austrian Littoral. In his articles, he attacked Italian irredentism, and called for a peaceful coexistence of nationalities within the Habsburg monarchy. In Vilfan's view, such coexistence could only be assured on strong local autonomy, a liberal democratic reform of the State, and clearly defined and enforced linguistic rights. According to Vilfan, Trieste should become the example of national tolerance for the whole Empire.

Between 1909 and 1917, he was member of the Trieste City Council, representing the United Slavic National List, which was under the undisputed hegemony of the Slovene Liberals. During this time, he tried to find a common ground with the Yugoslav Social Democratic Party.

After the outbreak of the Italian Front in May 1915, Wilfan was appointed by the Austro-Hungarian authorities to the Security Council of the City of Trieste, a highly influential auxiliary body, established in order to help the Austrian military authorities to evacuate the city in the case of an Italian occupation. The Security Council was also involved in the creation of a Civic Guard that would fight against possible subversive actions. The activity of the Council was mostly directed against the local Italian irredentist culture. By the end of the war, this institution was highly unpopular among Trieste's Italian speaking majority.

== Under Italian rule ==
At the end of World War I, when the Austro-Hungarian Monarchy collapsed, Wilfan was in Ljubljana, where he was among the founders of the State of Slovenes, Croats and Serbs. At the time, he collaborated closely with several Liberal activists, such as Milko Brezigar and Gregor Žerjav, in the creation of a unified Liberal party in the Slovene Lands, called Yugoslav Democratic Party.

In the meantime, however, Trieste was occupied by the Royal Italian Army. Wilfan strongly supported the annexation of Trieste to Yugoslavia. However, after the Treaty of Rapallo assigned the entire former Austrian Littoral to the Kingdom of Italy, Vilfan argued for a policy of agreement with the new State authorities. Together with Engelbert Besednjak and Virgil Šček, Vilfan emerged as the foremost leader of the Slovene and Croatian national community in the Julian March. In 1921, he was elected to the Italian Parliament. After the rise of Fascism, he became disillusioned and pessimist regarding the possibilities of parliamentary activities. He personally visited the Italian Fascist dictator Benito Mussolini on three occasions (in 1922, 1924, and 1928), in order to persuade him to undertake a more conciliatory policy towards national minorities.

By the mid-1920s, Vilfan's policy of collaboration with the authorities and of passive resistance to Fascist Italianization became increasingly challenged by the ranks of his own National Liberal fraction. In 1927, a group of young Slovene left wing nationalists formed the militant anti-fascist organization TIGR.

Vilfan himself was a victim of Fascist violence. In 1920, the Fascist squads destroyed his office and family home in Trieste. In 1926, he was placed under arrest during one of his stays in Rome. The following year, he was arrested in Florence, and spent several weeks in prison. In 1928, he decided to flee from Italy, after his last personal meeting with Mussolini turned out as a complete failure.

== International minority rights activist ==
In 1928, Vilfan moved to Vienna, where he became one of the leaders and later the President of the Congress of European Nationalities. During this time, he closely collaborated with the Christian Socialist politician Engelbert Besednjak for the internationalization of the question of South Slavic minorities in Italy. He also wrote several treatises on minority rights and international relations.

After the Anschluss in 1938, Vilfan moved from Vienna to Belgrade, where he spent the rest of his life. Between 1945 and 1954, he collaborated with the Yugoslav Communist regime as an expert on the Trieste question. He died in Belgrade in 1955, and was buried in Ljubljana.

== Influence and legacy ==
In the 1920s, Vilfan was a highly influential figure among Slovene liberals, especially in the Slovenian Littoral. Between 1921 and 1928, he was the editor of the journal Pravni vestnik ("The Legal Herald"), which was one of the most important journals for legal theory in South Slavic languages. The legal theorist Boris Furlan was the most renowned of Vilfan's collaborators.

In the 1930s, Vilfan's positions towards the minority question came under severe criticism by the more radical exponents of the Slovene minority in Italy, especially by the emigre circles in Yugoslavia around Lavo Čermelj and Ivan Marija Čok, who opted for a "territorial solution", that is the annexation of Istria, Trieste and the Slovenian Littoral to Yugoslavia. His views were also rejected by the militant organization TIGR, which adopted a strategy of violent confrontation with the Fascist regime. During World War II, his positions were publicly rejected by the Communist-led Liberation Front of the Slovenian People.

A street in Piran and one in Nova Gorica have been named after him.

== Family life ==
Vilfan came from an influential family of Trieste Slovenes. His nephew Sergij Vilfan was a renowned historian. His son Draško Vilfan became a famous physician. His son Joža Vilfan became a Communist activist, and later an influential Yugoslav diplomat. His grandson Jernej Vilfan was a novelist and essayist.

== Major works ==
- Politika in etnika ("Politics and Ethnicity", Gorizia: 1928).
- Die Nationalitäten in den Staaten Europas: Sammlung von Lageberichten (Vienna - Leipzig: 1931).
- Die Organisierung der Volksgemeinschaft (Vienna: 1932).
- O tisti obliki življenja, ki ji pravimo narod ("On That Form of Living, Called Nation", 1932; published posthumously in Trieste, 1978).
- Die programmatische Arbeit der Nationalitätenkongresse (Vienna: 1934).
- The Congress of European Nationalities and the Peace Problem (Vienna: 1936).

== Sources ==
- Biographical entry in the 'Biographical Lexicon of Slovenes from the Littoral', pp. 214-216

== Works about Vilfan ==
- Jože Pirjevec, Pensiero e attivtà di Josip Vilfan (Bologna: Il Mulino, 1994).
- Egon Pelikan, Josip Vilfan v parlamentu = Discorsi parlamentari dell'on. Josip Vilfan (Trieste: Krožek za družbena vprašanja Virgil Šček, 1997).
- Gorazd Bajc, Josip Vilfan: življenje in delo primorskega pravnika, narodnjaka in poslanca v rimskem parlamentu (Koper: University of Primorska, 2005).

== See also ==
- Josip Ferfolja
