= Valentino Pittoni =

Socialist politician from Trieste

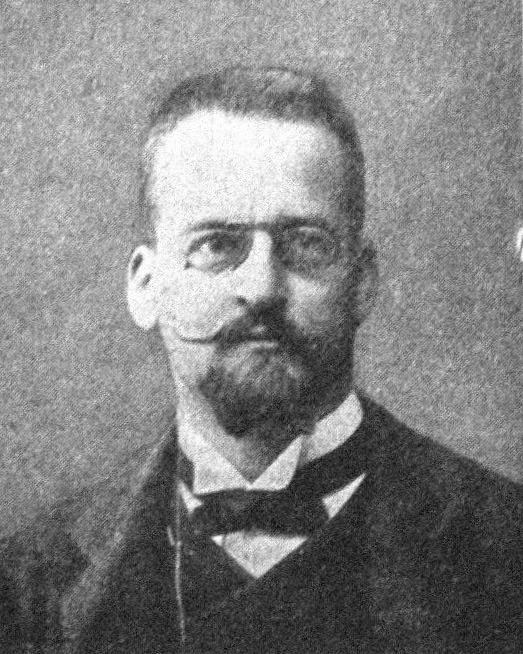
- Valentino Pittoni c. 1907

Member of the Austrian Imperial Council
- In office 1907–1918
- Constituency: Trieste (Old City and San Giacomo)

Personal details
- Born: 23 May 1872 Brazzano, Cormons
- Died: 11 April 1933 (aged 60) Vienna
- Party: Social Democratic Workers Party of Austria
- Children: Bianca Pittoni (1904–1993); Nerina Pittoni

Valentino Pittoni (German: Valentin Pittoni; 23 May 1872 – 11 April 1933) was a socialist politician from Trieste, who was mainly active in Austria-Hungary. As a follower of Austromarxism and militant of the Social Democratic Workers Party of Austria (SDAPÖ), he came to oppose both Italian irredentism and Slovenian nationalism. In the early 20th century he emerged as the key leader of the socialist movement in the Austrian Littoral region. Pittoni represented Trieste in the Imperial Council, where he became known as a proponent of electoral democracy, and was additionally a member of Trieste's Municipal Council. He set up a cooperative movement, as one of several ventures ensuring inter-ethnic solidarity in the Littoral.

Increasingly isolated after World War I, Pittoni was uncompromising in demanding Trieste's autonomy within Austria, and eventually its independence from the Kingdom of Italy. He was a noted adversary of Italian fascism, who lived his later life in exile in Vienna. His final contributions were as a newspaper editor and doctrinaire of interwar Austrian socialism.

== Early life ==
Pittoni was born on 23 May 1872, in Brazzano, part of the Cormons municipality. His father was a textile trader. During his childhood the family moved to Trieste. He studied at the Trade Academy (Accademia di Commercio e Nautica) in Trieste, and worked on his father's business. During his youth, Pittoni sympathized with irredentism. He was called for military service in the Austro-Hungarian Army, and was discharged with the rank of Second Lieutenant.

Later, Pittoni joined the Trieste Workers Society, which, despite the name, was a moderate nationalist group with only some socialist members. In 1896 he befriended the Austrian socialist leader Victor Adler, who invited him to join SDAPÖ that same year. For the next twenty years, Pittoni was strongly influenced by Adler's Austromarxist ideological line. He lobbied for the transformation of the Austro-Hungarian empire into a Danubian Confederation of non-territorial nationalities. A staunch internationalist, he opposed any Italian irredentist moves. For Pittoni, irredentism was promoted by Italian capitalists to weaken unity of the working class. Nonetheless, he and his movement had only marginal contacts with the Slovene neighbours, as Pittoni resented Slovenian nationalism and opposed the Slavic claims over Trieste (or "urban Slavism").

Pittoni joined the Social Democratic League, a Triestine branch of the SDAPÖ, and, by 1902, was involved in mediating between the socialists and organised labour. That year, he helped the senior socialist leader Carlo Ucekar in directing the Österreichischer Lloyd stokers strike, but lost control of it to anarchist agitators. The strike ended in bloodshed. The authorities were lenient toward the socialists, and willing to blame the strike on anarchists, but made a point of warning Pittoni to comply in the future.

Later that year, Ucekar died; Pittoni vied for and won the post as leader of the Social Democratic League. With Pittoni at the helm, the Triestine socialists moved closer to the Austromarxist centre, holding the 1905 anti-war and anti-irredentist demonstration which coincided with the official launch of SMS Erzherzog Ferdinand Max.

== Parliamentarian ==
The 1907 Austrian general election was the first to be held with universal male suffrage. Pittoni was elected to the Imperial Council with an absolute majority, representing the first constituency of Trieste (covering the old city and the suburb of San Giacomo). Although this was a major victory for his version of socialism, Pittoni noted that his League lacked cadres, and reached out to members of Italian Socialist Party (PSI), in the Kingdom of Italy, proposing that they should relocate their militancy to Trieste. He allowed a measure of nationalism to seep into his discourse, noting: "It is up to us to also deal with the national issue." In August, he represented his party at the Stuttgart Congress of the Second International.

Like other SDAPÖ deputies, Pittoni demanded the introduction of universal suffrage in Transleithania, which was administered by the Gyula Andrássy government in Budapest. As he noted in a parliamentary address of October 10, 1908: "it can no longer be indifferent to the nations of Austria if the disenfranchised peoples and classes of Hungary still fail to receive the rights we owe them." Together with Adler, Etbin Kristan, Engelbert Pernerstorfer and Josef Steiner, he presided over an SDAPÖ Conference which demanded "freedom in Hungary".

From 1907 onwards Cesare Battisti, a left-wing intellectual inside the party from Trentino, emerged as prominent leader of Trieste's League. Battisti and Pittoni clashed on political issues, especially following the 1908 Bosnian crisis. The latter incident had created a dissonance between the goals of socialist internationalism and those of Austrian nationalism, but Pittoni played it down, arguing that many Bosniaks were already subjects of the Austrian monarchy, in Croatia-Slavonia. Overall, Pittoni claimed, "the right of ethnic self-determination hinges on that state's democratization prospects" (implying that Bosniaks lacked such prospects outside the Austrian tutelage). He also noted that, contrary to the indignation in Italy, Italians had nothing to fear. Against Pittoni, Battisti maintained an anti-militarist and separatist position. Pittoni also found himself criticised by PSI irredentists Claudio Treves, Leonida Bissolati and Gaetano Salvemini.

Pittoni was elected municipal councillor of Trieste in 1909, and promoted labour management initiatives. Chief editor of the party organ, Il Lavoratore, and a key figure in the Social Studies Circle, Pittoni also founded the Workers Cooperative of Trieste, Istria and Friulia. His participation in such causes increased the cultural and educational prestige of socialism, solving many of the movement's teething problems, and helping to spread the cooperative ideals among the Slovene population. He conditioned affiliation to these cooperatives on the desegregation and inter-ethnic solidarity of candidate unions. He also campaigned for the establishment of Workers Club and an Italian university in Trieste.

Pittoni retained his parliamentary seat in the 1911 Austrian general election. This time he was supported by mainstream Slavic parties, opposed to Felice Venezian's Italian national-liberals, but could not count on the regular Slovene voters, who withdrew their support. As leader of the Italian parliamentary club, Pittoni supported an inquiry into the affairs of Transleithania, where, according to fellow deputy George Grigorovici, the Hungarian Post was censoring the correspondence of left-wing opponents, including Austrian subjects.

Like the rest of his party, Pittoni issued protests against Rudolf Montecuccoli's plan to modernize and increase the Austro-Hungarian Navy. Together with Adler and with members of the PSI, he co-founded an anti-war congress that would report on any rearmament on either side of the Italian–Austrian conflict. During October 1912, he participated in the mass rallies opposing Austria-Hungary's involvement in the First Balkan War, and petitioned the government on that subject.

== World War ==
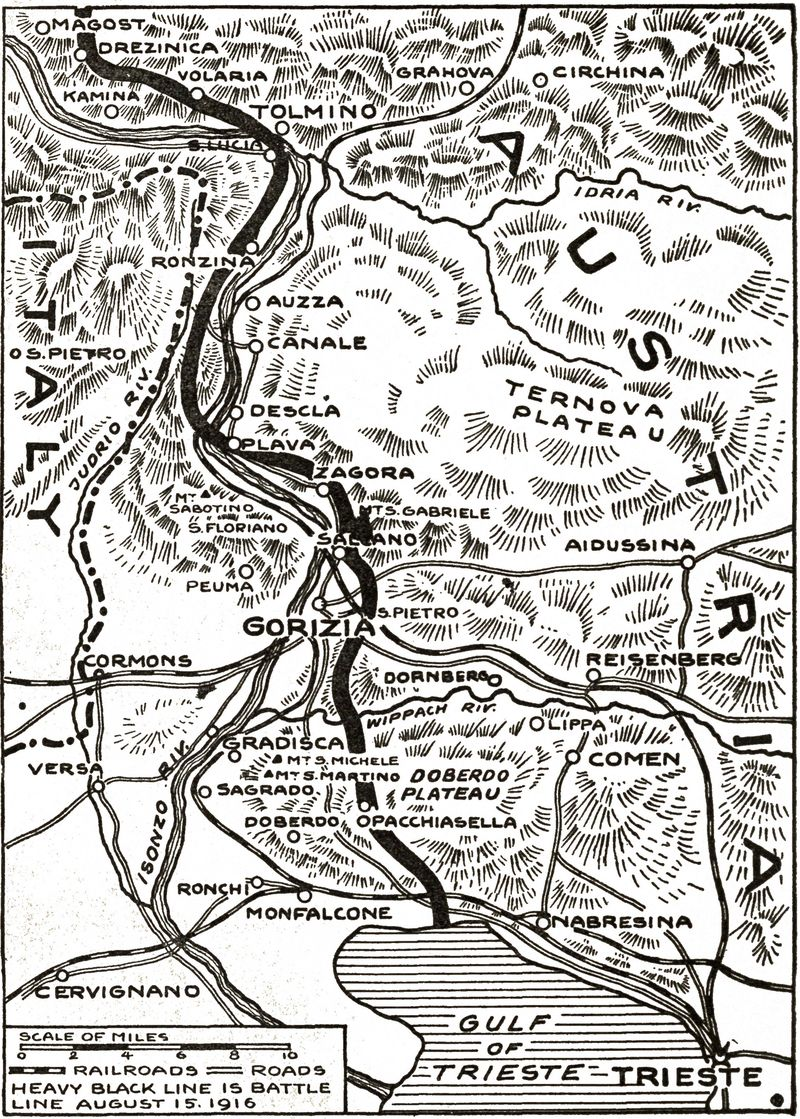
The Italian Front in August 1916

In 1914, just before the start of World War I, Pittoni began cooperating with the Yugoslav Social-Democratic Party (JSDS), which had recently relocated in Trieste, and set up a shared bureau to oversee common operations. However, he insisted that the common slogan was that of "national toleration [and] workers solidarity", and that the status of Trieste as an Austrian port could not expect to change.

In May 1915, Italy declared war on Austria-Hungary. The violence of the subsequent "Mountain War" demoralized Pittoni, who pleaded with his government for the fair treatment of Italian captives and refugees. He and the Slovene Henrik Tuma conceived of an abortive plan to establish a bi-national Trieste as part of the Austrian monarchy. It was to include Monfalcone, San Dorligo della Valle, Muggia and other rural localities, which were supposed to form an anti-irredentist cordon of Slovenes and Friulians. In mid 1916, they joined hands with other JSDS moderates, reestablishing the newspaper Zarja, which, against the SDAPÖ party line, advocated the end of war. The Pittoni–Tuma project was opposed by the Yugoslavist wing of the JSDS, whose leader Josip Ferfolja accused the internationalists of facilitating his people's "death as a nation".

Probably as a result of this nonconformism, Pittoni was again conscripted into the Austro-Hungarian Army and sent to the front, before returning to Trieste as cooperative leader, working to ensure the city's supply in food and basic goods. He regained his seat in the Imperial Council in summer 1917, when it reopened its sessions, and declared himself willing to represent the Austrian workers at an international peace conference that was planned by the International Socialist Commission (ISC) in Stockholm. At odds with Adler, who supported continuing the war, he moved closer to Karl Renner's faction, which stood by the old confederation programme, but he also issued messages of sympathy toward the revolutionary, Bolshevik and "maximalist", groups. He notably demanded freedom for Adler's son Friedrich, jailed for his assassination of Minister-President von Stürgkh.

Faced with the challenges of Yugoslavism and Austro-Hungarian dissolution, Pittoni called for the creation of an independent Istrian state or a "Republic of Venezia Giulia". It was to demand protection from the League of Nations, but Pittoni also spoke of other diplomatic alternatives, including an American or a Bolshevik occupation. In late 1918, as the Slovene National Council prepared to assume control of the region, he publicized the manifesto of Emperor Charles, which proposed an Austrian confederation and a special role for Trieste. However, he faced increased opposition within the Trieste socialist movement from the Giuseppe Tuntar–Ivan Regent faction (which favoured an Italo-Slavic Soviet Republic) and from irredentist or "socialist-nationalists" such as Edmondo Puecher, who had organised the strike of January 1918. He responded by purging Il Lavoratore staff of suspected irredentists, including writer Bruno Piazza.

In October 1918, during the Battle of Vittorio Veneto, the Imperial Council's Italian club dissolved: a "national fascio" was formed, unilaterally proclaiming the annexation of Istria and South Tyrol by the Kingdom of Italy. Pittoni condemned the move, as did the Friulian deputies Luigi Faidutti and Giuseppe Bugatto. However, he agreed to become a member of the Italian deputies' Permanent Commission, which was led by the fascio's spokesman, Enrico Conci. Although stranded in Vienna, he communicated with his Triestine faction: his second-in-command, Alfredo Callini, was a member of the Committee of Public Safety, formed after Governor Alfred von Fries-Skene abandoned Trieste. Pittoni had by then lost all footing inside the JSDS, with Ferfolja accusing him of being a covert irredentist.

== Exile ==
In early 1919, following the Armistice of Villa Giusti, Pittoni protested as the Arditi and the Fasci Italiani di Combattimento took over in Trieste. The city was soon placed under the governorship of Carlo Petitti di Roreto, who tried to talk Pittoni into accepting the national unification and the Trieste Social Democratic League's integration with the PSI. Pittoni was also opposed to the PSI's revolutionary socialism, and, in April 1919, stood in the minority of Trieste socialists who voted against joining the PSI and the Comintern; he also defended Adler, Camille Huysmans, and the ISC against Bolshevik criticism. By mid 1919 many of Pittoni's followers, Callini included, had deserted to the irredentist camp. Pittoni himself radicalised his opposition to Italian integration, and from 1920 argued that Trieste should form a state within the new Republic of Austria.

In 1922 Pittoni resigned from his posts in the party, complaining that the socialist movement had fallen prey to "the most arrogant and greedy kind of capitalism". By then, he had lost control of Il Lavoratore to a Bolshevik faction which was eventually absorbed into the Italian Communist Party. Pittoni moved to Milan, where he managed a Consorzio Italiano consumers' cooperative. He campaigned for the unification of Italian cooperatives into "a few hundred powerful organisms", which, as he explained in a February 1922 article for La Cooperazione Siciliana, were to form the basis of "a new society". His daughter Bianca (born in Trieste on March 20, 1904) also became politically active, joining Anna Kuliscioff's socialist circle in Milan.

Pittoni remained in Italy after the fascist coup of October 1922, but was eventually driven out by the increasingly violent regime in 1925. He moved back to Vienna, and lived the rest of his life in relative poverty. Granted protection by the municipal government of Karl Seitz, he became editor of the Arbeiter-Zeitung. Like other Italian emigrants, among them Angelica Balabanoff, he managed to influence SDAPÖ doctrines, contributing to its strong show of anti-fascism. In the conflict between Italian resistance groups, Pittoni raised funds for Filippo Turati's United Socialists. Bianca Pittoni, who also left Italy in 1927, became Turati's secretary and confidante, and then worked with Giuseppe Saragat in Vienna. Such activities irritated Benito Mussolini, the Italian fascist leader, who repeatedly urged the Austrian Christian Social Party to liquidate the Viennese socialist "canker".

Pittoni died in Vienna on 11 April 1933. The funeral oration was given by SDAPÖ colleague Wilhelm Ellenbogen, who called Pittoni's fight against irredentism "one of the most glorious actions in the history of Austria's workers movement", and praised his "intimate affinity with the Austro-German thought and sentiment". As argued by researcher Gilbert Bosetti, Pittoni's death "put an end to all hopes of a reform-minded Triestine socialism that supported peace among peoples."

Bianca went on to fight for the International Brigades in the Spanish Civil War. During World War II, pursued by OVRA and the Gestapo, she joined the French Resistance in Poitou-Charentes. From 1944, she was employed by the Embassy of the Republic of Italy in Paris, where she died in 1993. Pittoni's other relatives were still residing in Italian Trieste, and then in the Free Territory. They include his other daughter, Nerina, and his niece Anita Pittoni, founder of Lo Zibaldone publishing house. Nerina's son, Luciano Manfredi, was Anita Pittoni's heir.
