= Social Democratic Party of Yugoslavia =

Social Democratic Party of Yugoslavia Socijaldemokratska stranka Jugoslavije
- Abbreviation: SSJ
- Leader: Vitomir Korać
- Founded: 2 April 1920
- Dissolved: 18 December 1921
- Split from: Socialist Workers' Party of Yugoslavia (of Communists)
- Merged into: Socialist Party of Yugoslavia
- Headquarters: Zagreb
- Ideology: Socialism
- Political position: Left-wing

The Social Democratic Party of Yugoslavia was a political party in the Kingdom of Yugoslavia.

Party was founded during foundation of the Kingdom of Serbs, Croats and Slovenes around group of former Social Democratic Party of Croatia and Slavonia inside Socialist Workers' Party of Yugoslavia (of Communists) led by Vitomir Korać. Party dissolved on 18 December 1921, when it merged into the Socialist Party of Yugoslavia.

== Sources ==
- Toma Milenković, Socijalistička partija Jugoslavije (1921-1929), “Institut za suvremenu istoriju”, Beograd, 1974.
- Pavlowitch, Stevan K. (2002). Serbia: The History behind the Name. London: Hurst & Company. ISBN 9781850654773.
