= Selo, Lukovica =

Selo
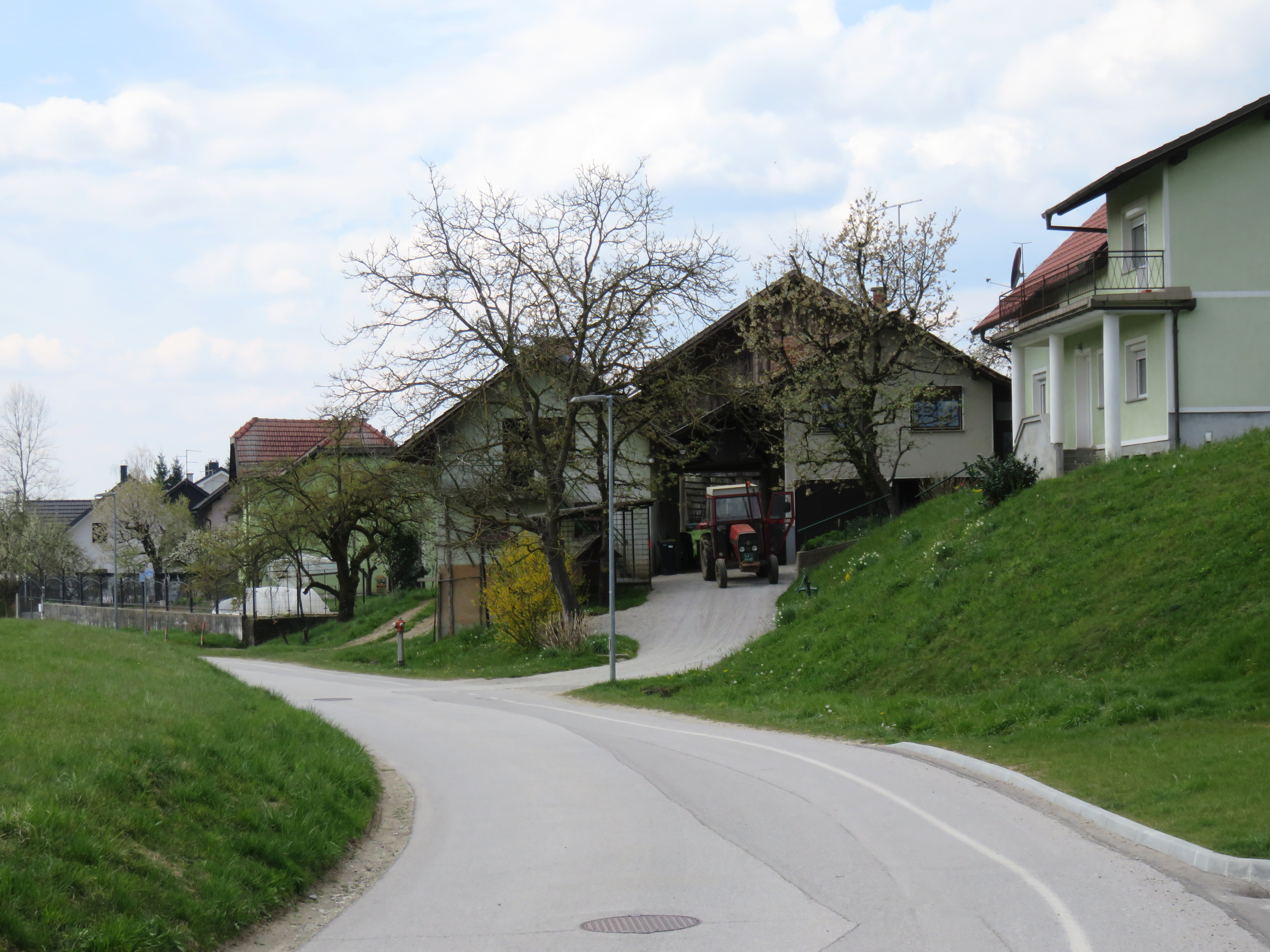

- Location in Slovenia
- Coordinates: 46°09′54″N 14°40′53″E
- Country: Slovenia
- Traditional region: Upper Carniola
- Statistical region: Central Slovenia
- Municipality: Lukovica
- Elevation: 337 m (1,106 ft)

Selo (pronounced [ˈsɛːlɔ]) is a former village in central Slovenia in the Municipality of Lukovica. It is now part of the village of Lukovica pri Domžalah. It is part of the traditional region of Upper Carniola and is now included in the Central Slovenia Statistical Region.

== Geography ==
Selo is a small roadside settlement between Šentvid pri Lukovici and Lukovica pri Domžalah.

== Name ==
The name Selo is derived from the Slovene common noun selo 'village, settlement'.

== History ==
Selo was annexed by Lukovica pri Domžalah in 1953, ending its existence as a separate settlement.

== Notable people ==
Notable people that were born or lived in Selo include:

- Dragotin Lončar (1876–1954), historian, editor, and politician
