= Dolinar =

Dolinar is a Slovene surname. Notable people with the surname include:

- Aleš Dolinar (born 1979), Slovene motorcycle speedway rider
- Elvira Dolinar (1870–1961), Slovene writer, feminist and teacher
- Ivan Dolinar (1840–1886), Slovene politician, teacher and journalist
- Lojze Dolinar (1893–1970), Slovene sculptor
- Žarko Dolinar (1920–2003), Croatian biologist and table tennis player
