= Etbin Kristan =

Slovenian labour leader and Social Democratic politician and writer (1867-1953)

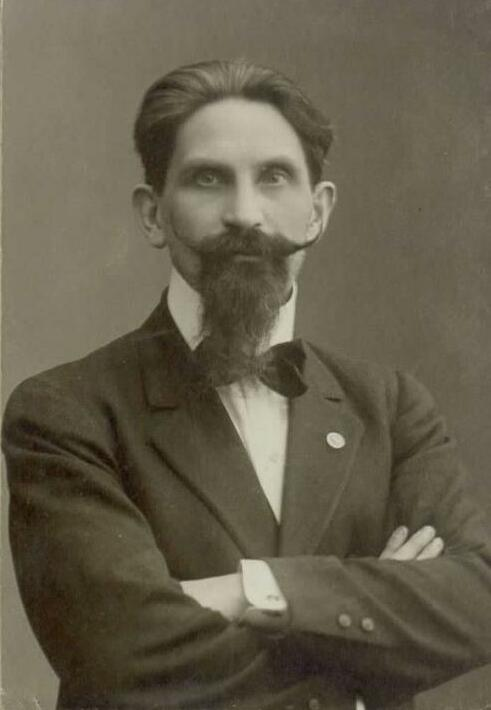
Etbin Kristan

Etbin Kristan (15 April 1867 – 22 November 1953) was a Slovenian labour leader and Social Democratic politician and writer during the late-Austrian-Hungarian and the Yugoslav monarchy.

== Biography ==
Kristan was born in Ljubljana, Duchy of Carniola, Austria-Hungary (now the capital of Slovenia) and baptized Ethbin. He attended high school in Ljubljana and in Zagreb. After finishing high school, he enrolled in the military school in Karlovac. In 1887, he quit the military, moved to Vienna, and dedicated himself to journalism.

In Vienna, he became active in the labor movement. In 1896, he co-founded the Yugoslav Social Democratic Party (JSDS), and served as its chairman until 1914. Kristan belonged to the left wing of the party. He was one of the masterminds of non-territorial autonomy, but was not able to convince his comrades from other Austrian social Democratic parties. He advocated cultural autonomy for all the peoples in the Austro-Hungarian Empire, and clashed with the right wing of his party (represented by Albin Prepeluh, Dragotin Lončar and Josip Ferfolja), which demanded territorial autonomy for Yugoslav peoples.

In 1914, he emigrated to the United States. He returned shortly after the end of World War I and served as member of the first parliament of the Kingdom of Serbs, Croats and Slovenes. Disappointed by the political development in Yugoslavia, he moved back to America in 1921. He settled in Cleveland, Ohio, and co-founded the Slovene Republican Association of America, which he chaired.

He returned to Yugoslavia shortly before his death in 1951. He died in Ljubljana in 1953.

== Literary career ==
In addition to his political career, Kristan was a translator, journalist, poet, and novelist, and the editor of many Slovene publications based in Europe and the United States.
