= Ivan Dolinar =

Slovene Christian Democrat politician, teacher and journalist

Ivan Dolinar (1840–1886) was a Slovene Christian Democrat politician, teacher and journalist.

== Biography ==
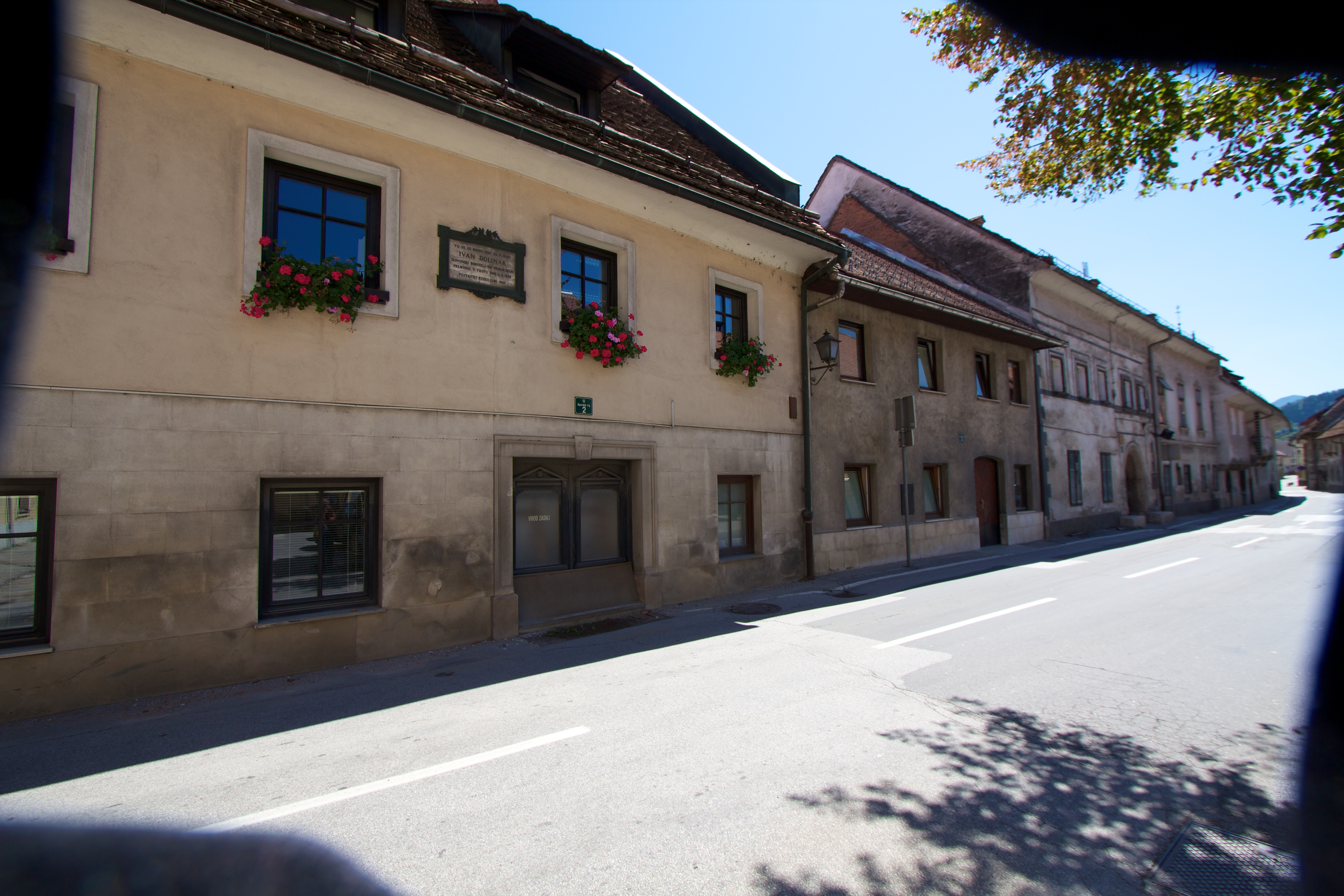
Birth house of Ivan Dolinar in Škofja Loka

Ivan Dolinar was born in Škofja Loka. After attending primary school he studied art and wood carving at Štefan Šubic. Traveled to Dalmatia and Montenegro and in 1859 he enlisted in Carniola and performed military service in Italy during the Second Italian War of Independence (April 26, 1859 – July 12, 1859). Carved and painted religious subjects for the Church, was the nephew of the priest, composer and poet Luka Dolinar. In 1865 he decided to stay in Trieste and lived in the neighborhood of Scorcola. Dolinar was co-founder and first president of Delavskega podpornega in bralnega društva (Association for support and literature). He was the founder and secretary of Edinost (bralno in politična društvo, i.e. association of reading and politics), this association and involvement with children and workers of the Slovene minority and organized cultural moments of reading, formed youth choirs, groups and organizations and theater, schooling in Slovenian. He was owner, publisher and editor of the Consortium of the newspaper Edinost. Dolinar died in Trieste, June 6, 1886, his obituary is on Edinost of 2 April 1898, A. XXXIII, No. 40 (press night).

== See also ==
- Josip Ferfolja
- Boris Furlan
- Engelbert Besednjak

== Sources ==
- Enciclopedia Slovena, Ljubljana, 1988
- Slovenski Biografski Leksikon.
- I giornali triestini dal 1863 al 1902, Trieste 1976, Silvana Monti Orel
- Slovenska tiskana beseda v tiskarnah na Primorskem 1607-1918: bibliografija Andreina Jejčič - 1989 - 181 pagine
- Krajevni leksikon Slovenije: knj. Zahodni del Slovenije Roman Savnik, Francè Planina, Živko Šifrer - 1968 (Pagina 381)
- Stare slovenske lipe: Kramljanja z ljudmi o življenju, ki je stoletja teklo ... Miran Sattler, France Stele - 1973 - 254 pagine(a pag.41 Ivan Dolinar se je tu rodil leta 1840. Mogoče se je pri hiši že prej tako reklo, kajti Ivan Dolinar se je pod svoje članke ...)
- Politično življenje Slovencev: od 4. januarja 1797. do 6. januarja 1919. letPagina 50 Dragotin Lončar - 1921 (a pagina 177 Deset let pozneje je začel »Slovenec« izhajati dnevno. Leta 1876. je ustanovil Ivan Dolinar (1840—1886) list ...)
- Arhivska zapuščina Petra Grassellija, 1842-1933 - Pagina 467 Marjan Drnovšek - 1983 (a pagina 522 ... Ivan Dolinar (1840–1886) je de- loval tudi pri ...)
- Libro di scorno libro d'onore : la scuola elementare triestina durante l'amministrazione austriaca (1761–1918) / Diana De Rosa. Udine : Del Bianco Editore-1991-411 pagine
