= Personal autonomy =

Personal autonomy may refer to:

- Bodily integrity, inviolability of the physical body
- Libertarian personal autonomy, libertarian concept of the ability to initiate a task and do it one's own way, without orders from authorities who do not know the actual problem and the available means
- National personal autonomy, Austro-Marxist concept of nationality based on associations of persons rather than geographical areas

== See also ==
- Autonomy discusses various concepts of autonomy, some of which may be characterised as personal
