= Slovene Peasant Party =

Slovenian political party

The Slovene Peasant Party (Slovene: Slovenska kmetska stranka, SKS) was a Slovenian agrarianist political party in the Kingdom of Serbs, Croats and Slovenes. It was active between 1926 and 1929. During its short-lived history, it was one of the most important political parties in Slovenia.

The party was founded in May 1926 out of the fusion of the liberal agrarian Independent Agrarian Party and the left wing federalist Slovenian Labour Agrarian Republican Party. The new party adopted a federalist and progressivist program, and became one of the most vocal advocates of Slovenian autonomy within Yugoslavia.

The Slovene Peasant Party allied itself with the Croatian Peasant Party, which largely served as its ideological model. However, the Slovene Peasant Party never gained the popularity of its Croatian counterpart. Although it gained substantial support in some areas in Slovenia (especially in parts of Slovenian Styria and in Lower Carniola), it remained far behind the conservative Slovene People's Party, its main political adversary.

The Slovene Peasant Party only participated in the parliamentary elections of 1927. Between 1927 and 1929, it formed a united opposition front together with the Croatian Peasant Party and the Independent Democratic Party against the coalition government between the Serbian Radicals and the Slovene People's Party.

== Aftermath ==
After the establishment of the January 6th Dictatorship in 1929, the Slovene Peasant Party was dissolved. Many of its former members, mostly from the Independent Agrarian Party, later joined the pro-regime Yugoslav National Party. Its left wing, on the other hand, re-organized itself around the youth movement known as Union of Peasant Boys and Girls, which was one of the strongest youth movements in Slovenia in the 1930s. In many areas, they formed the core of the Slovenian partisan resistance during World War II.

== Prominent members ==
- Ivan Pucelj, chairman
- Albin Prepeluh
- Dragotin Lončar
- Drago Marušič
- Venceslav Winkler
