= Centrumaši =

Centrumaši (English: Centrists) was a reformist faction in the Communist Party of Yugoslavia, called the Socialist Labour Party of Yugoslavia (Communists) in the early 1920s. After the Second Congress in Vukovar in 1920, the name was changed to Communist Party of Yugoslavia and Centrumaši became more marginalised and, after publishing “Manifesto of the Opposition of the CPY”, were expelled from the party. They objected the name change to and continued to use SLPY(C) for several years and even ran against the CPY in the elections of 1920. The most important member of this group was Živko Topalović.

In March 1921 Centrumaši formed the Socialist Workers Party of Yugoslavia. By December 1921, this party had united with Social Democratic Party of Yugoslavia and Yugoslav Social Democratic Party, forming the Socialist Party of Yugoslavia.

== Sources ==
- Socijalni demokrati ili centrumaši. Pravo naroda. 1921.
- Bojan Balkovec (2009). Jugoslavija v času: devetdeset let od nastanka prve jugoslovanske države. Historia. pp. 87–. ISBN 978-961-237-295-8.
