= Lavo Čermelj =

Slovene physicist, political activist, and author

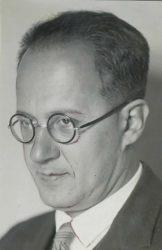
Lavo Čermelj

Lavo Čermelj, Italianized name Lavo Cermeli (10 October 1889 – 26 January 1980), was a Slovene physicist, political activist, journalist, and author. In the 1930s, he was one of the foremost representatives of Slovene anti-Fascist émigrés from the Italian-administered Julian March, together with Josip Vilfan, Ivan Marija Čok, and Engelbert Besednjak.

== Life ==
Lavo Čermelj was born in Trieste, then part of the Austro-Hungarian Empire. After graduating from the German-language lyceum in his native town, he enrolled at Charles University in Prague, where he studied law for one year. He then switched to the University of Vienna, where he studied mathematics and physics, graduating in physics in 1914. During World War I he was drafted into the Austro-Hungarian Army. After the war he returned to Trieste, then already part of the Kingdom of Italy, where he worked as a professor at a private Slovene-language high school. In the late 1920s he collaborated with several underground organizations that were resisting the policies of Fascist Italianization in the Julian March. When his activities were traced by the Italian Fascist secret police, he illegally emigrated to the Kingdom of Yugoslavia. He settled in Ljubljana and was employed at the Bežigrad Grammar School.

In the early 1930s, he started actively working as a researcher at the Minority Institute in Ljubljana, a private institution established to study the position of Slovene minorities in Italy, Austria, and Hungary. In 1935, he published the volume Life-and-Death Struggle of a National Minority: The Yugoslavs in Italy, in which he described the persecution of the Slovenes and Croats in the Julian March and in Venetian Slovenia. The book was later translated into French, German, Italian, and Russian, and it became a reference work on the subject.

When the Italian army annexed the Province of Ljubljana after the invasion of Yugoslavia in April 1941, Čermelj was arrested by the Italian authorities and tried at the Second Trieste trial. He was sentenced to death, but the conviction was later converted to life imprisonment. He was sent to the maximum security prison on the island of Elba. In 1944 he was released by Allied troops and joined the Yugoslav Partisans. After World War II, he collaborated as an expert for the Yugoslav foreign ministry, and after 1947 he dedicated himself mostly to the study of the legal position of the Slovene minority in Italy.

Čermelj also wrote several books and articles for the popularization of science. In 1971 he translated Hoyle's book Astronomy from 1962 into Slovene.

He died in Ljubljana. In 1999, a memorial bust by Jakov Brdar was erected to him in Toscanini Park in Ljubljana.

== See also ==
- Josip Ferfolja
- TIGR
