= Socialist Party of Yugoslavia =

- Leader: Vitomir Korać; Živko Topalović
- Founded: 18 December 1921
- Dissolved: 1941
- Merger of: Socialist Workers Party of Yugoslavia; Yugoslav Social-Democratic Party; Social Democratic Party of Yugoslavia
- Newspaper: Radničke novine
- Youth wing: Socialist Youth League of Yugoslavia (1921)
- Ideology: Social democracy Republicanism
- Political position: Left-wing
- International affiliation: Labour and Socialist International

The Socialist Party of Yugoslavia (Serbo-Croatian: Socijalistička partija Jugoslavije, Социјалистичка партија Југославије) was a political party in the Kingdom of Yugoslavia. The party was founded on 18 December 1921 with Živko Topalović as the secretary and Vilim Bukšeg as the president of the party.

== Foundation ==
The party emerged from a process of unification of three groups: the centrumaši (the 'centrists'), Vitomir Korać's right-wing social democrats and the Yugoslav Social-Democratic Party from Slovenia. The centrists was a group that emerged from the nascent Communist Party of Yugoslavia.

The centrists had proposed that the Communist Party should tone down its revolutionary line, seek cooperation with the government and distance itself from the Communist International, in order to save the party from the harsh repression inflicted upon it. After having made these proposals public in a 'Manifesto of the Opposition' (issued in November 1920, signed by 115 persons), they were all promptly expelled from the Communist Party. Initially the centrists tried to stay clear from both the social democrats and the communists, and in March 1921 they formed the Socialist Workers Party of Yugoslavia. But this endeavour soon proved fruitless, and the centrists found themselves obliged to merge with Korać's Social Democratic Party of Yugoslavia, formed in April 1920. However, some centrists would remain opposed to this merger.

== Further development ==
As of the late 1920s, the party claimed a membership of around 4,000, out of whom 300 were women. The youth organization of the party had around 1,500 members. The party got around 25,000 votes in the 1927 municipal election, and won around 100 seats in local councils around the country. In the parliamentary election the same year one candidate of the party, Jossif Petejan, was elected.

During Milan Stojadinović's reign, the party opposed the introduction of a fascist-style form of government, modelled after Italy or Germany.

During the Second World War, Topalović became a close associate with the Chetnik leader Draža Mihailović. Topalović became the president of the Ba Congress assembled by Mihailović.

== International affiliation ==
The party was a member of the Labour and Socialist International between 1923 and 1929, and again between 1934 and 1940.

== Press ==
The main organ of the party was the weekly newspaper Radničke Novine, published from Belgrade. Other weekly newspapers of the paper were Delavec (Ljubljana), Delavska Politika (Maribor) and Radničke Novine (Zagreb). The party also published the German-language biweekly Volksstimme from Maribor.

== See also ==
- Socialist Youth League of Yugoslavia (1921)

== Sources ==
- Toma Milenković, Socijalistička partija Jugoslavije (1921–1929), "Institut za suvremenu istoriju", Beograd, 1974.
- Pavlowitch, Stevan K. (2002). Serbia: The History behind the Name. London: Hurst & Company. ISBN 9781850654773.
