= Socialist Youth League of Yugoslavia (1921) =

The Socialist Youth League of Yugoslavia (Serbo-Croatian: Savez Socijalističke Omladine Jugoslavije, abbreviated SSOJ) was a youth organization in Yugoslavia, the youth wing of the Socialist Party of Yugoslavia. It was founded by the students circle in Zagreb in 1921. As of the late 1920s, they claimed to have around 1,500 members.
