= Non-territorial autonomy =

Form of self-determination

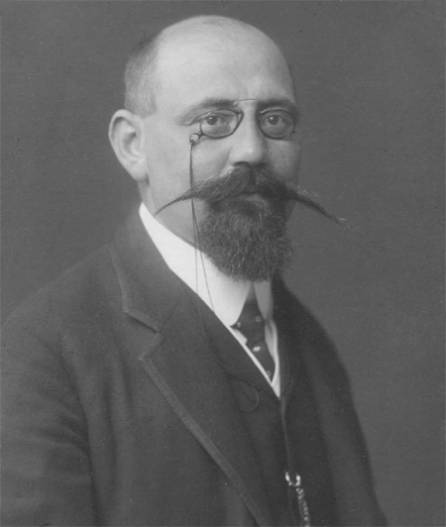
Austrian social democrat Karl Renner, the first and most important theorist of modern non-territorial autonomy

Non-territorial autonomy is a form of self-determination in which the autonomous are not population groups living in a territory with defined borders, but rather communities defined by linguistic, cultural, and religious features, whose preservation, in many cases, is facilitated according to the terms of the group’s autonomy within the state.

Although means of social organization similar to non-territorial autonomy were also present in the distant past (the most famous of them is the millet system of the Ottoman Empire), the modern understanding of non-territorial autonomy is based on the works of Austrian social democrats Karl Renner and Otto Bauer published in the last years of the 19th and first years of the 20th century. They proposed an autonomy model which was aimed to find a solution to the problems and conflicts caused by the ethnic diversity in Austria-Hungary. However, various forms of non-territorial autonomy implemented today can be multifaceted and they may not have any connection with the vision of Renner and Bauer.

Non-territorial autonomy may be applied in practice or considered suitable in theoretical discussions, for example, to manage diversity inside a state, including for mitigating ethnic conflicts and preventing separatist sentiments among minorities. In addition, non-territorial autonomy can be one of the power sharing measures that increase the involvement of minority groups in decision making processes. Non-territorial autonomy is considered particularly suitable for the protection of the interests of dispersed communities, but it has also been considered suitable for, for example, indigenous peoples whose interests are actually often territorial. Thus, non-territorial autonomy may not function well as a completely independent measure, but may be combined with various means of territorial diversity management.

== Concept and criticism ==
Non-territorial autonomy is an umbrella term and highly contested concept, the meaning of which is interpreted differently by both researchers and practitioners. This term has been used either as a synonym or as a connected term with several other concepts with a similar meaning, such as national personal autonomy, personal autonomy, national cultural autonomy, cultural autonomy, extraterritorial autonomy, corporate autonomy and segmental autonomy. In addition, non-territorial autonomy has been associated with consociationalism and plurinationalism. Alexander Osipov, a researcher of non-territorial autonomy, has found that although all of these concepts may have their own shades of meaning, non-territorial autonomy is the broadest and at the same time a neutral term. Some scholars argue that the term is not appropriate and too vague as most instances being labeled as "non-territorial autonomy" are neither non-territorial in a strict sense nor cases of political rule and autonomy, but of minority protection. The term is thus said to contribute to the conceptual confusion in the field.

In general, among political scientists and other researchers of non-territorial autonomy, it is considered most natural to associate this concept with the Austrian social democrat Karl Renner. Mentioning Renner (and somewhat less often also Otto Bauer) as a pioneer and one of the most important theorists of non-territorial autonomy is standard practice in academic publications on the subject.

== History ==
=== Early cases ===
According to political scientist John Coakley, some phenomena similar to non-territorial autonomy existed already in medieval Europe. As one example, he has pointed out that the King of Bohemia allowed the Germans residing in the state to live according to their own legal system. Similar autonomous rights were granted by other monarchs as well. As another example, Coakley has described the autonomy of Jews in the Polish-Lithuanian Commonwealth which guaranteed them freedom of decision not only in religious, but also in family and economic matters.

=== Millet system in the Ottoman Empire ===
The millet system, which existed in the Ottoman Empire from the Conquest of Constantinople in 1453 until the 19th century, is often considered one of the earliest examples of non-territorial autonomy, and sometimes its most successful and long-lasting form. Some researchers have considered the millet system to be a near-ideal form of non-territorial autonomy that could be successfully applied even today, but others have in turn found that it is unsuitable for today's conditions.

The millet system was not actually a codified system, but a set of administrative practices for regulating the relations between the state and communities. Such regulations offered protection and autonomy to communities while imposing tax obligation to the state. Using the millet system, the Ottoman Empire managed the country's religious diversity, particularly regarding the Jewish, Orthodox, and Armenian communities, with smaller religious communities placed under these three larger communities in terms of state administration. Although it is generally believed that the millet system was based on religion, it has also been found that it did not concern only religious communities, but was a much more broad system of social organization and included a territorial approach in addition to a non-territorial, thereby affecting, among others, for example, the Kurds who were Muslims and lived compactly in one area.

The Millet system has been considered a successful administrative model because it prevented a larger opposition to the state. In addition, according to researchers, the millet system increased the well-being of communities by guaranteeing social and cultural autonomy and legal pluralism. With the reforms in the 19th century, however, the management of religious communities changed—all non-Muslims were declared equal citizens of the empire, whereas in the days of the millet system, they had been separate and unequal communities, although under the protection of the state. However, it has been argued that certain elements of the old system were preserved and partially survived in several countries that emerged after the collapse of the Ottoman Empire or later in this area (Egypt, Israel, Lebanon, Turkey).

According to Karen Barkey, a researcher of the Ottoman Empire, and her colleague George Gavrilis, the Russian Empire and Austria-Hungary also tried to implement methods of managing internal religious and/or ethnic diversity similar to the millet system. Furthermore, they have explicitly compared the autonomy ideas that emerged in Austria-Hungary with the millet system.

=== Autonomy ideas of Austromarxists ===
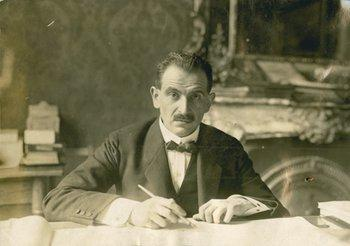
Otto Bauer, one of the most important non-territorial autonomy theorists in the late Austria-Hungary, in addition to Karl Renner

The ideas of autonomy based on non-territorial principles emerged in Austria-Hungary, particularly in Cisleithania, against the background of constant national conflicts, which were manifested at several fields of everyday life such as the education system and political representative assemblies. The issue of language use turned out to be the most acute, especially in areas where the German language was dominant despite the fact that people who used German as an everyday language were in a numerical minority there, as well as, for example, in Galicia, where the Polish language was dominant.

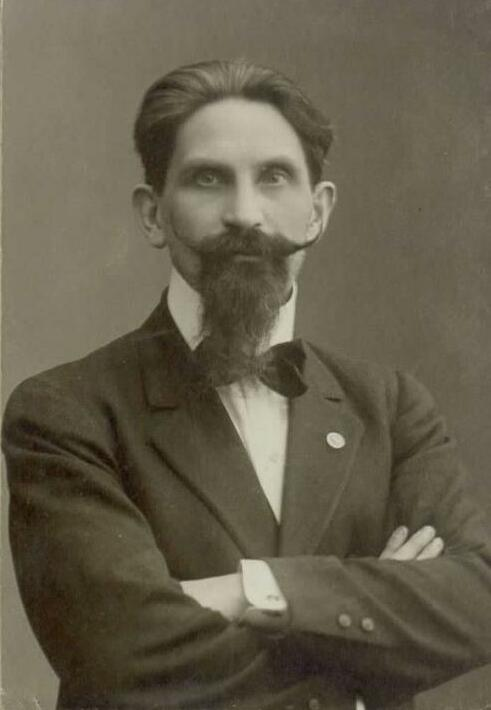
Etbin Kristan, a lesser-known advocate of non-territorial autonomy who proposed including this idea in the party program of the Austro-Hungarian Social Democrats

Against the backdrop of tense ethnic relations, two social democratic politicians from the circle of Austromarxists emerged: Karl Renner, who himself came from Moravia, one of the regions with the most tense ethnic relations, and Otto Bauer. Renner published his vision for the reorganization of the administrative organization of the empire in 1899 in his book Staat und Nation ('State and Nation') and in 1902 in Der Kampf der österreichischen Nationen um den Staat ('The Struggle of Austrian Nations for the State'). Bauer published his similar views in the book Die Nationalitätenfrage und die Sozialdemokratie ('The National Question and Social Democracy') in 1907. Of these writings, Renner's Staat und Nation ('State and Nation') has been considered groundbreaking in the development of the idea of non-territorial autonomy. A lesser known Austromarxist autonomy theorist was Etbin Kristan from Slovenia, although it was he who proposed to introduce the principle of non-territorial autonomy into the party program at the Congress of Social Democrats in Brno in 1899.

Relying on the belief that the religious wars ended in Europe only when the state and the church were separated, in the Austromarxists’ view, national conflicts could only stop if the state and the nation were separated. Renner and Bauer proposed a model in which a central national parliament would be elected by all eligible citizens of the empire and it would be responsible for issues of national importance such as foreign policy and the military, while issues of culture and education would be dealt with by nation-based elected councils. According to Renner's vision, the country should have been divided as far as possible into monolingual districts with full political autonomy, while autonomy based on national registries should have been established in multilingual districts. Renner and Bauer's model was based on the personal principle, according to which national communities would be formed according to the voluntary consent of individuals to belong to them. Renner in his writing "Staat und Nation" argued that every citizen should declare his or her nationality upon reaching the voting age, on the basis of which the community would be formed and on the basis of which representative assemblies would be elected.

The ideas of Renner and Bauer did not find any support in the Austrian Social Democratic Workers' Party, but national cultural autonomy nevertheless did not remain only an object of abstract discussions. In the last decades of the existence of Austrian-Hungary, the ideas of autonomy were tried to some extent in reality. Such an experiment was, for example, the adoption of the local constitution of Moravia in 1905, also known as the Moravian Compromise. According to the compromise the income-based election curias of the Moravian parliamentary elections were divided into Czech and German sections. In order to ensure that the Czechs chose representatives of their own nationality and the Germans chose the Germans, ethnicity-based electoral lists of voters, also known as cadastres, were provided. A similar compromise followed in Bukovina in 1909 and in Galicia in 1914. By contrast, according to the 1910 constitution of Bosnia-Herzegovina, which was annexed in 1908, income-based curias were divided into sections based not on nationality but on religion. These local constitutions allowed members of ethnic groups (or religious communities) to elect representatives of their community to local parliaments, but did not offer economic autonomy or completely separate representative assemblies to any ethnic group.

The ideas of autonomy developed by the Austro-Marxists attracted interest outside Austria as well. As a result, at the end of and after the First World War, the ideas of non-territorial autonomy were tried to be implemented in several new countries, but the main principle changed. While the Austro-Marxists wanted to manage the ethnic diversity within the country with the help of autonomy, later non-territorial autonomy became one of the measures for the protection of minorities.

=== Between the two World Wars ===
After the collapse of the Russian, Austro-Hungarian, German and Ottoman empires in 1917 and 1918, the management of national cultural diversity and ensuring the rights of minorities became particularly relevant in the new countries that emerged on their former territories. Unlike in Western Europe, individuals in these regions with an imperial background were clustered into ethnocultural communities rather than political nations. Such communities were not always clearly separated by territorial lines between each other, resulting in multi-ethnic states.

Already during the First World War, in 1915, the Central Organization for Durable Peace had been established. One of its members, the Austrian lawyer Rudolf Laun, advocated the idea of non-territorial autonomy. A few months after the end of the war he drew up a plan for an international treaty for the protection of national minorities, which was approved by the Organization in March 1919 and submitted to the Paris Peace Conference. In this document, Laun suggested that education and culture should be the responsibility of autonomous institutions based on national registries. However, the Paris Peace Conference and later the League of Nations completely rejected such a solution to the minority issue. The fact that Karl Renner led the Austrian delegation at the peace conference did not help promote the autonomy ideas either. The declarations concerning the protection of the rights of minorities of Central and Eastern European countries submitted to the League of Nations in the following years also did not provide for the collective rights of minorities, hiding the possibility of such rights behind vague wording. According to Börries Kuzmany, a historian studying non-territorial autonomy and leader of an ERC project on non-territorial autonomy, this fact reflects the general reluctance to create a new subject in international law in the form of minority nations, next to states and their citizens.

Despite the described developments, several countries started looking for solutions to the minority issue in various forms of non-territorial autonomy. In the short-lived People's Republic of Ukraine, the National Personal Autonomy Law, passed in 1918, enabled the ethnic groups living in the country to organize their lives through national representative bodies. However, due to the instability of the state, this law could never become fully functional. The national autonomy of the Jews was established in Lithuania, but began to be limited as early as 1922 and was finally liquidated in 1926. In Estonia, the Estonian Cultural Autonomy Act established cultural autonomy for national minorities in 1925. Although there was no comparable cultural autonomy in Latvia, the school laws of 1919 allowed minorities to manage schools in their own languages independently.

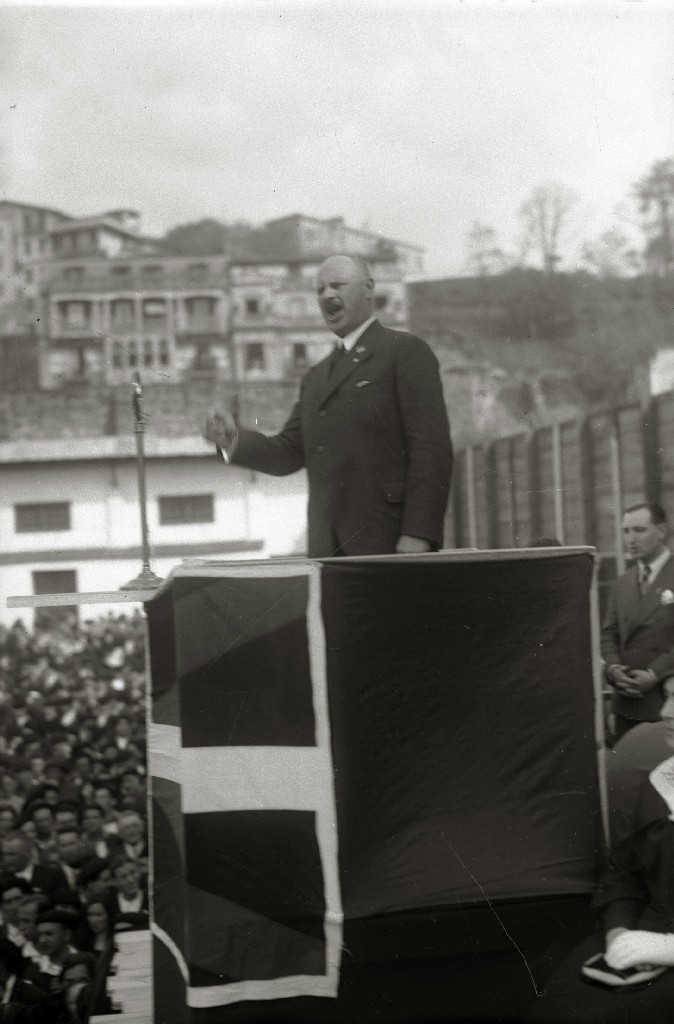
Ewald Ammende, Secretary General of the Congress of European Nationalities and advocate of non-territorial autonomy

However, the international minority protection mechanisms of the interwar period did not satisfy several European national minorities, especially the Germans living scattered in various Central Eastern European countries, and they started looking for new ways to protect their interests, as a result of which international minority activism intensified. In 1925, on the initiative of Ewald Ammende, a Baltic German from Estonia, the Congress of European Nationalities was founded, and he was also active as its Secretary General until his death in 1936. The congress promoted the idea of national cultural self-governments of minorities, finding that each minority should be able to decide for themselves whether they want such a self-government and that each individual should have the freedom to decide whether they want to be included in the national registry of a respective self-government. The most influential activists of the congress were Ammende as general secretary and Werner Hasselblatt, also a Baltic German from Estonia. Thus, the congress considered the 1925 Estonian Cultural Autonomy Act to be an important example in shaping its visions and goals. In the early 1930s, the congress even proposed to the League of Nations the establishment of a similar cultural autonomy in all European nation-states, but this proposal was firmly rejected by the League of Nations. Later, during the 1930s, the Congress of European Nationalities lost its previous role as a liberal organization consolidating various national groups and became a representative body of German revisionist views, with the Sudeten Germans in Czechoslovakia promoting the idea of non-territorial autonomy to serve their territorial demands.

Outside of Europe, the idea of non-territorial autonomy attracted little interest in the interwar period, although it did find some attention and support in, for example, India.

=== Second half of the 20th century ===
Minority activism in the interwar period was later associated with the unleashing of a new war and this discredited the topic of minority rights as a whole. With the new world order that emerged after the Second World War, the issue of collective rights of minority nations disappeared from the agenda in Europe for some time, as new international organizations put individual rights and freedoms in the foreground instead of collective rights, and at times it was even thought that the nation as a concept had lost its importance in European politics.

In reality, however, the problem of minorities did not disappear, but dealing with it largely remained an internal matter or was resolved by bilateral agreements, such as the Gruber-De Gasperi Agreement between Austria and Italy and the Bonn-Copenhagen declarations between Denmark and West Germany. Also, the political scientist John Coakley, while admitting a general lack of interest in the concept of non-territorial autonomy during this era, has nevertheless emphasized that the Belgian constitutional reform, which included elements of non-territorial autonomy, was launched several decades after the war.

After the collapse of the Eastern Bloc and the Soviet Union, interest in non-territorial autonomy has grown significantly in Europe, especially in Central Eastern European countries. This interest has sometimes been limited to discussions, but has also led to the establishment of various forms of autonomy at the legislative level. Political scientist David Smith has argued that these developments in Central Eastern Europe were linked to the democratization process, heightened interest in minority issues due to tense national relations, and efforts to stabilize society. Thus, the question of whether non-territorial autonomy actually benefits specific minorities or increases their inclusion in society has remained secondary. Nevertheless, developments in Central Eastern Europe have been considered a "paradigm shift" for the idea of non-territorial autonomy.

=== 21st century ===
Against the background of developments in Central Eastern Europe, by the beginning of the 21st century, interest in the theory and practical applications of non-territorial autonomy has increased significantly in academic circles and among policy makers. The growing interest has also been linked to a general increase in ethnic tensions, the spread of secessionism and increased migration, as well as economic problems and climate change. These trends force the policy makers to review existing models of social organization and look for new solutions, among which non-territorial autonomy appears as a promising solution to several challenges.

In academic publications, in the first few decades of the 21st century, the concept of non-territorial autonomy has been used to describe the ways of social organization of several countries in the world, which can either be defined as autonomy or in which elements of autonomy can be found: Belgium, Bolivia, Estonia, Ethiopia, Canada, Norway, Sweden and Finland with their regulations concerning the rights of the Sámi people, Serbia, Slovenia, Hungary, New Zealand, Russia. The presence of remnants of the Ottoman millet system in Bulgaria, Egypt, Israel, Iraq, Greece, Cyprus, Lebanon and Turkey has also been mentioned as forms of non-territorial autonomy. In the case of some of the above-mentioned countries (Israel, Canada, Turkey), in some studies not an already existing autonomy is mentioned, but proposals to introduce autonomy. The possibility of establishing non-territorial autonomy has also been actively discussed in some other countries (for example, Romania), although the relevant legislation has not yet been adopted. The issue of non-territorial autonomy has also been on the agenda in Kosovo and Ukraine, and it has also been proposed to establish Roma autonomy at the level of the European Union. There are, however, only very few comprehensive, comparative and empirical studies on the topic, compared to research on territorial autonomy

Like in the interwar years, the idea of non-territorial autonomy is of interest to policy-makers in the 21st century still mainly in Europe, while it has been stated that, for example, in Africa, various territorial solutions are still preferred when managing national diversity.

== Purpose ==
Today's understanding of the purpose of non-territorial autonomy is largely based on the view that national ethno-cultural diversity is important in democratic societies and must be supported and accommodated through various measures. Autonomy theorists realize that the individual right to non-discrimination cannot guarantee the protection of minority interests related to language and culture, and therefore such rights can only be exercised collectively. Thus, the solutions must also be aimed at collectives. The collective rights of minority groups can be guaranteed, for example, by regulating the activities of cultural and educational institutions or the public language use.

It has also been argued that the autonomous management of certain fields concerning minority communities (such as language use, education system and culture) should be guaranteed to minorities, regardless of the place of residence of individuals belonging to the respective minority. Since ethnic groups often live scattered within a country, territorial autonomy would not be in their interest, and thus different forms of non-territorial autonomy can be suitable for such communities.

In addition, it is believed that non-territorial autonomy can be a suitable tool for the inclusion of minorities in decision-making processes. Non-territorial autonomy as a measure of inclusion has also sometimes been associated with power sharing, although this connection has remained weak in studies: it appears that there is a partial overlap of non-territorial autonomy with consociationalism as a power-sharing measure, but at the same time these concepts have been clearly distinguished.

Non-territorial autonomy could potentially help make societies more stable. It is believed that social tensions and conflicts can be mitigated by guaranteeing the rights of minorities and implementing various inclusion mechanisms. By preferring non-territorial autonomy to territorial one in this regard, the risk of separatism could be reduced, which would prevent the territorial integrity of the state from being endangered.

Non-territorial autonomy has also been discussed as a potentially suitable tool for the restoration of the rights and protection of the interests of indigenous peoples, and it has also been implemented for this purpose in some countries. At the same time, opinions about the suitability of non-territorial forms of autonomy for indigenous peoples are conflicting.

== Issues and challenges ==
=== Social cohesion ===
In connection with non-territorial autonomy, the so-called "dilemma of ethno-cultural diversity" has been mentioned, i.e. the question of how to ensure that the recognition of minority rights does not harm the cohesion of society and the integrity of the state. In this regard, the political scientist Tove Malloy has presented a comparison with territorial autonomy: if territorial autonomy is to some extent accompanied by the separation of a certain territory from the state and thus the territorial integrity of the state could be endangered, then non-territorial autonomy could call into question the "purity" of society and thereby reduce its cohesion. At the same time, she has considered this hypothetical problem rather a myth, because both territorial and non-territorial autonomy have been successfully implemented in many parts of the world.

=== Relevance of territory ===
Non-territorial autonomy seems to some extent to be a better approach compared to territorial autonomy, firstly because minorities often live scattered in the country (even if the majority of representatives of a particular nationality are territorially concentrated, some individuals would still live outside the autonomous territory) and secondly, the creation of an autonomous territory would in turn mean the emergence of new minorities within this territory. However, the question may still arise whether minorities living compactly in a certain area would prefer a non-territorial autonomy model, which offers them only some cultural rights, but not special rights related to their main settlement area. This potential issue suggests that non-territorial autonomy may not be a viable solution in several cases. In addition, leaders of territorially compact national groups may be more inclined to demand territorial autonomy, while leaders of scattered groups look for other solutions instead of autonomy to protect their interests, which reduces the importance of non-territorial autonomy.

The importance of territory is particularly evident in debates concerning the suitability of non-territorial autonomy for indigenous peoples. There are authors who have considered non-territorial autonomy as a suitable solution for the protection of their rights, and it has been argued that non-territorial representative bodies of indigenous peoples have indeed been created in several countries of the world such as Canada, New Zealand, Bolivia and Ethiopia. At the same time, indigenous peoples have a connection to a specific territory and consider it important to restore rights in their original settlements, despite the fact that today the representatives of these communities often live scattered in their countries of residence. In addition, the culture, traditions and identity of indigenous peoples are strongly tied to the territory, and the rights over the natural resources located in these areas play an important role in their self-identification. Due to the importance of territorial settlements, other authors argue that non-territorial autonomy is not a suitable solution for indigenous peoples.

It has also been argued that non-territorial and territorial autonomy need not be completely mutually exclusive, but one can contribute to reducing the disadvantages of the other. In this case, the former would act as a complement to the latter, not as an alternative. Non-territorial autonomy as a supplement to territorial rights has been highlighted specifically in studies concerning indigenous peoples.

=== The issue of belonging ===
One of the major challenges in establishing non-territorial autonomy is the question of how to decide who should belong to a particular autonomous group. The problem of determining belonging is related to a number of assumptions in the concept of non-territorial autonomy, such as the essentialist view of ethnic identity, according to which individuals have a certain ethnic affiliation, and groupism. At the same time, the borders of ethnic groups are vague at the individual level, and it is not always clear which and how many ethnic groups individuals associate themselves with. Even in situations where the ethnic identity of individuals can be defined unambiguously, it still does not say anything about their political preferences, nor can the preferences of individuals be transferred to an entire group.

One of the possible options to solve the problems related to belonging is a national registry. The idea of national registries came up in late 19th century Habsburg schooling administration, and was first introduced in provincial elections in Moravia, Bukovina and Bosnia in imperial Austria. Voters were registered in one of the national registries, but had the right to object to their national classification by the authorities. The idea of national registries was also taken up by Karl Renner and Otto Bauer. In their view, the national registries were supposed to offer individuals the opportunity to register themselves as members of a specific linguistic-cultural community, and based on these lists, elections were to be held for national representative bodies, which should then have to deal with school management and other cultural issues. At the same time, individuals may not always want to register themselves based on nationality and alternative solutions are therefore needed. Another option is therefore to allow anyone who wants to vote and be elected to minority institutions to enroll. The disadvantage of this variant is the possibility that those who have no connection with a particular community can also be elected, as a result of which the representative body may not truly represent that community. The third option can be the ad hoc electoral rolls drawn up for the elections of representative bodies, in which individuals must still meet specific requirements to register. Such electoral rolls are, for example, used in the elections of the Sami parliaments in the Nordic countries.

=== Symbolic autonomy ===
The use of the word autonomy when talking about non-territorial autonomy has often been considered problematic in the academic literature, as it is not obvious whether it reflects real autonomy. For example, in the sense of autonomy, one can talk about self-governments, which can sometimes refer to actual and functioning self-government, but often also to legal or institutional recognition guaranteed to a certain extent based on nationality. Tove Malloy has indeed found that minority self-governments are often talked about in cases where autonomous institutions are not actually present. Thus, she has raised the rhetorical question in which cases one can speak of the existence of non-territorial autonomy at all.

In addition to theoretical discussions about the symbolic nature of non-territorial autonomy, researchers have often criticized specific autonomy models that exist today precisely for the reason that they are symbolic, cosmetic and useless. At the same time, some researchers of non-territorial autonomy have considered it necessary to emphasize the usefulness of symbolic forms of autonomy for minority communities, as it increases their status in society and access to state authorities.

== See also ==
- Millet (Ottoman Empire)
- Jewish Autonomism - Kehilla - Asefat ha-Nivharim
- National personal autonomy
- Non-territorial language policy
- Consociationalism
- Plurinationalism
- Panarchy (political philosophy)

== Sources ==
- Alenius, Kari. 2007. "The Birth of Cultural Autonomy in Estonia: How, Why, and for Whom?" Journal of Baltic Studies 38, no. 4: 445–462.
- Andeva, Marina, Dobos, Balázs, Djordjević, Ljubica, Kuzmany, Börries, and Malloy, Tove (eds.). 2023.Non-Territorial Autonomy. An Introduction. New York: Palgrave Macmillan.
- Arraiza, José-María. 2015. "The Management of Linguistic Diversity Through Territorial and Non-Territorial Autonomy." Europäisches Journal für Minderheitenfragen / European Journal on Minorities 8, no. 1: 7–33.
- Barkey, Karen. 2005. "Islam and Toleration: Studying the Ottoman Imperial Model." International Journal of Politics, Culture, and Society 19, no. 1–2: 5–19.
- Barkey, Karen and George Gavrilis. 2016. "The Ottoman Millet System: Non-Territorial Autonomy and its Contemporary Legacy." Ethnopolitics 15, no. 1: 24–42.
- Coakley, John. 2016. "Introduction: Dispersed Minorities and Non-Territorial Autonomy." Ethnopolitics 15, no. 1: 1–23.
- Dessalegn, Beza. 2019. "Experimenting with Non-Territorial Autonomy: Indigenous Councils in Ethiopia." Journal on Ethnopolitics and Minority Issues in Europe 18, no. 2: 3–23.
- Dodovski, Ivan. 2021. "The Emerging Significance of Non-Territorial Autonomy: A Foreword." In Non-Territorial Autonomy as an Instrument for Effective Participation of Minorities, edited by Balázs Vizi, Balázs Dobos and Natalija Shikova, 7–12. Budapest, Skopje: Centre for Social Sciences & University American College Skopje.
- Germane, Marina. 2013. "The History of the Idea of Latvians as a Civic Nation, 1850–1940." PhD Diss., University of Glasgow.
- Housden, Martyn. 2014. On Their Own Behalf: Ewald Ammende, Europe's National Minorities and the Campaign for Cultural Autonomy 1920–1936. Amsterdam, New York: Rodopi.
- Josefsen, Eva, Ulf Mörkenstam and Jo Saglie. 2015. "Different Institutions within Similar States: The Norwegian and Swedish Sámediggis." Ethnopolitics 14, no. 1: 32–51.
- Kuzmany, Börries. 2016. "Habsburg Austria: Experiments in Non-Territorial Autonomy." Ethnopolitics 15, no. 1: 43–65.
- Kuzmany, Börries. 2020. "Non-Territorial National Autonomy in Interwar European Minority Protection and Its Habsburg Legacies." In Remaking Central Europe: The League of Nations and the Former Habsburg Lands, edited by Peter Becker and Natasha Wheatley, 315–342. Oxford: Oxford University Press.
- Kuzmany, Börries. 2023. "Objectivising national identity: The introduction of national registers in the late Habsburg Empire." Nations and Nationalism 29, no. 3: 975-991.
- Liber, George. 1987. "Ukrainian Nationalism and the 1918 Law on National – Personal Autonomy." Nationalities Papers 15, no. 1: 22–42.
- Malloy, Tove H. 2015a. "Introduction." In Minority Accommodation Through Territorial and Non-territorial Autonomy, edited by Tove H. Malloy and Francesco Palermo, 1–10. Oxford: Oxford University Press.
- Malloy, Tove H. 2015b. "Introduction." In Managing Diversity Through Non-territorial Autonomy: Assessing Advantages, Deficiencies, and Risks, edited by Tove H. Malloy, Alexander Osipov and Balázs Vizi, 1–15. Oxford: Oxford University Press.
- Mulej, Oskar. 2022. "Territorial and Non-territorial Aspects in the Autonomist Proposals of the Sudeten German Party, 1937–38." Nationalities Papers 50, no. 5: 942–962.
- Nimni, Ephraim. 2005. "Introduction: The National Cultural Autonomy Model Revisited." In National Cultural Autonomy and its Contemporary Critics, edited by Ephraim Nimni, 1–14. Abingdon, New York: Routledge.
- Osipov, Alexander. 2013. "Non-Territorial Autonomy during and after Communism: In the Wrong or Right Place?" Journal on Ethnopolitics and Minority Issues in Europe 12, no. 1: 7–26.
- Prina, Federica. 2020. "Nonterritorial Autonomy and Minority (Dis)Empowerment: Past, Present, and Future." Nationalities Papers 48, no. 3: 425–434.
- Shikova, Natalija. 2020. "The Possibilities and Limits of Non-Territorial Autonomy in Securing Indigenous Self-Determination." Filozofija i društvo / Philosophy and Society 31, no. 3: 363–381.
- Smith, David. 2011. "National Cultural Autonomy." In The Routledge Handbook of Ethnic Conflict, edited by Karl Cordell and Stefan Wolff, 278–287. Routledge: London.
- Smith, David J. 2013. "Non-Territorial Autonomy and Political Community in Contemporary Central and Eastern Europe." Journal on Ethnopolitics and Minority Issues in Europe 12, no. 1: 27–55.
- Smith, David J. 2014. "Minority Territorial and Non-Territorial Autonomy in Europe: Theoretical Perspectives and Practical Challenges." In Autonomies in Europe: Solutions and Challenges, edited by Zoltán Kántor, 15–24. Budapest: L'Harmattan.
- Smith, David J., Marina Germane and Martyn Housden. 2019. "‘Forgotten Europeans’: Transnational Minority Activism in the Age of European Integration." Nations and Nationalism 25, no. 2: 523–543.
- Spitzer, Aaron John and Per Selle. 2021. "Is Nonterritorial Autonomy Wrong for Indigenous Rights? Examining the ‘Territorialisation’ of Sami Power in Norway." International Journal on Minority and Group Rights 28, no. 3: 544–567.
- Tas, Latif. 2014. "The Myth of the Ottoman Millet System: Its Treatment of Kurds and a Discussion of Territorial and Non-Territorial Autonomy." International Journal on Minority and Group Rights 21, no. 4: 497–526.
