= Vitomir Korać =

Politician in the kingdoms of Croatia-Slavonia and Yugoslavia

- Born: 14 April 1877; Šid, Kingdom of Croatia-Slavonia, Austria-Hungary (now Serbia)
- Died: 8 September 1941 (aged 64); Iriški Venac, Kingdom of Yugoslavia (now Serbia)
- Occupation: Politician
- Political party: Social Democratic Party of Croatia and Slavonia (until 1921); Socialist Party of Yugoslavia (from 1921)

Vitomir Korać (14 April 1877 – 8 September 1941) was a politician born in Šid. In 1896, Korać became a member of the main committee of the Social Democratic Party of Croatia and Slavonia. He advocated cooperation of the social democrats with bourgeoisie parties as a means of political struggle against policies of the Ban of Croatia Károly Khuen-Héderváry. In 1905, he became a member of the Croat-Serb Coalition led by Frano Supilo and Svetozar Pribičević. Korać was elected a member of the Sabor of the Kingdom of Croatia-Slavonia in the term of 1908–1910. In 1918, Korać became a member of the National Council of Slovenes, Croats and Serbs – a body composed of political representatives of the South Slavs living in Austria-Hungary tasked with achieving independence of South Slavic lands from the empire. In November 1918, Korać gained prominence as the person who uncovered and reported an alleged planned coup d'état by General of the Infantry Anton Lipošćak in what became known as the Lipošćak affair. Korać was appointed the Social Policy Minister in the Government of the just established Kingdom of Serbs, Croats and Slovenes in 1918–1920. While advocating socialist policies, Korać opposed Bolshevism. As the minister in charge of the land reform in interwar Yugoslavia, Korać was co-author of the Interim Decree on the Preparation of the Agrarian Reform in the country. He unsuccessfully argued against any compensation to owners of land expropriated in the reform. Korać participated in establishment of the Socialist Party of Yugoslavia in Belgrade in 1921. In 1920s, Korać withdrew from politics and published the Povijest radničkog pokreta u Hrvatskoj i Slavoniji od prvih početaka do ukidanja ovih pokrajina 1922. godine ("History of the Workers' Movement in Croatia and Slavonia from its First Beginnings until the Abolition of these Provinces in 1922") in three volumes in 1929–1933. He died at Iriški Venac.
