= Josip Ferfolja =

Slovene lawyer and politician

Josip Ferfolja (27 September 1880 – 11 December 1958) was a Slovene lawyer and social democratic politician, and human rights activist from the Province of Gorizia. Although he was an Italian citizen for most of his life, he considered himself foremost a Slovenian.

== In Austria-Hungary ==
He was born in the village of Doberdò del Lago (Slovene: Doberdob) in what was then the Austro-Hungarian County of Gorizia and Gradisca (now part of the Italian Province of Gorizia). He attended high school in Gorizia, an important Slovene educational centre at the time; Ferfolja's school friends included historian Bogumil Vošnjak, economist Milko Brezigar, poet Alojz Gradnik, writer Ivan Pregelj, literary historian Avgust Žigon, and the prelate Luigi Fogar.

In 1901, he moved to Prague, where he studied law at the Charles University. There, he joined a group of Slovene students that had become influenced by the thought of Tomáš Masaryk, professor of philosophy, and later president of Czechoslovakia. The group, which included figures like Dragotin Lončar, Anton Dermota, Anton Kristan, and Ivan Žmavc, advocated a moderate reformist politics, based on a realistic analysis of social relations; their views were in many ways similar to the Fabian Society in contemporary Britain.

After graduation in 1906, he worked as a lawyer in Gorizia and Tolmin, before settling in Trieste in 1913. In 1907, he joined the Yugoslav Social Democratic Party (JSDS), helping in the development of its grassroots network first in the Austrian Littoral. In 1917, Ferfolja adhered to the May Declaration, a joined manifesto of Slovene and Croatian political parties in the Austrian part of the Austro-Hungarian Empire, demanding the formation of a unified and autonomous political entity of all Austro-Hungarian South Slavs on the basis of national self-determination. Together with Dragotin Lončar and Albin Prepeluh, he formed an alternative "patriotic" current in the Yugoslav Social Democratic Party, critical with the official internationalist and Austro-Marxist stance of the party.

== In Italy ==
After the Italian occupation of Trieste in early November 1918, he advocated the collaboration with Italian socialism, becoming a close collaborator of the local Italian trade union leader Valentino Pittoni. Ferfolja however objected the unifaction of Slovene and Croat social democrats of the Julian March with the Italian Socialist Party. After the Congress of Livorno of 1921, when most of the socialists of Trieste and the Julian March, both Italian and Slovene, joined the Communist Party of Italy, he withdrew from active politics. During the Fascist regime, he remained faithful to his democratic principles, although refusing to engage in any subversive action. In 1940/41, he was a legal advisor in the so-called Second trial of Trieste against the Slovene Communist leader Pinko Tomažič.

During World War II, he joined the Liberation Front of the Slovenian People; in 1944, he became the president of its Trieste section. After the occupation of Trieste by the Yugoslav People's Army in May 1945, he became one of the members of the city's "Liberation Council". He continued his collaboration with the Titoist political structures in Trieste until 1946, when he resigned from all position in protests against the overwhelming Communist influence. After the formation of the Free Territory of Trieste in 1947, Ferfolja organized the Group of Independent Slovenes (Skupina neodvisnih Slovencev, SNS), together with Frane Tomčič and Dušan Rybář, as an alternative left wing opposition against the prevailing influence of the Communist Party of the Free Territory of Trieste among the Slovene workers in Trieste. After 1950, Ferfolja's platform joined forces with other Slovene anti-Communist political organizations, forming the Slovene National List, the predecessor of the modern Slovene Union.

He died in Trieste in 1958.

== See also ==
- Engelbert Besednjak
- Josip Wilfan
- Boris Furlan
- Lavo Čermelj
- TIGR
