= Engelbert Besednjak =

Slovene Christian Democrat politician, lawyer and journalist

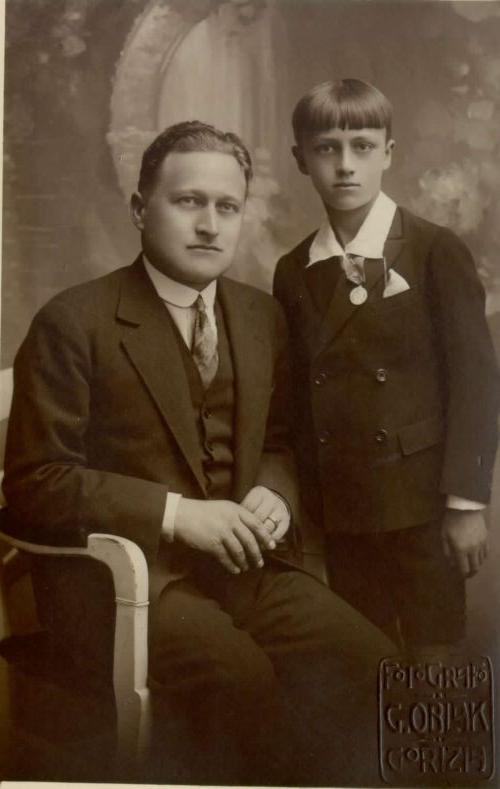
Engelbert Besednjak with his son in 1929

Engelbert Besednjak (March 14, 1894 – December 21, 1968) was a Slovene Christian Democrat politician, lawyer and journalist. In the 1920s, he was one of the leaders of the Slovene and Croat minority in the Italian-administered Julian March. In the 1930s, he was one of the leaders of Slovene anti-Fascist émigrés from the Slovenian Littoral, together with Josip Vilfan, Ivan Marija Čok and Lavo Čermelj.

== Biography ==
=== In Austria-Hungary ===
He was born to a Slovene-speaking lower-middle-class family in Gorizia, in what was then the Austro-Hungarian Empire (now in Italy). After finishing the German-language State Gymnasium in Gorizia, he enrolled at the University of Vienna, where he studied law, graduating in 1920.

In the years before World War I, he joined the young generation of Christian Socialist activists around the Carniolan priest Janez Evangelist Krek, who challenged the conservative leadership of the Slovene People's Party. Together with the priest Virgil Šček, Besednjak became one of the leaders of the Slovene Christian Socialist youth in the Austrian Littoral. Between 1913 and 1914, he was the president of the Christian Social Association (Krščansko-socialna zveza) in Gorizia and Gradisca, and between 1917 and 1919 he was a personal secretary of the chairman of the Slovene People's Party, Anton Korošec.

=== In the Kingdom of Italy ===
After World War One, he returned to Gorizia, and soon became one of the main figures of Slovene and Croat political Catholicism in the Julian March, an administrative region formed out of the former Austro-Hungarian Adriatic provinces annexed to Italy. In 1919, he became chief editor of the Slovene daily newspaper Edinost (Unity) of Trieste, and in 1921 he was elected to the Provincial Assembly of the Province of Gorizia. From 1922 to 1924, he was director of the newspaper Goriška straža (The Guard of Gorizia). In the mid-1920s, he was a member of the executive board of the League of the Slovene Agrarian Workers in Italy, and of the National Council of Croats and Slovenes in the Julian March. He also served as editor of the journal Socialna misel (Social Thought).

In 1924, he was elected to the Italian Parliament on the unified list of Slovene, Croat and South Tyrolean parties. Besednjak thus became, together with the national liberal politician Josip Wilfan who was also elected on the same list, the highest representative of the around half a million South Slavs living in Italy. He quickly rose to prominence for his eloquent defence of minority rights against Fascist Italianization. Despite his consistent criticism of the regime, he insisted on the political loyalty to the Italian state. He did not join the Aventine Secession, but continued with regular parliamentary work until mid 1926.

His parliamentary speeches, in which he defended minority rights, and human rights in general, from the early abuses of the Fascist regime, became famous among the Slovenes and Croats. Besednjak's speeches also attracted the attention of the Italian political scene and included parliamentary debates with the highest officials of the regime, including the Minister of Education Giovanni Gentile and Benito Mussolini himself. These speeches were printed in an integral version by Besednjak's journal Goriška straža, thus becoming widely known in the Slovene public. Several of his statements and punchlines entered the daily speech or acquired legendary status. His most famous speeches were directed against the school reform which sanctioned Italian as the sole language of education in Italy. In his last speech, delivered in the Italian Chamber of Deputies, he stated that, after the abolition of Slovene and Croatian language schools, every South Slavic family in Italy would transform itself into a school. In his concluding remark, he stated that "the laws of States are mutable, but Nations live forever", thus famously asserting the natural right of peoples before the established legal conventions.

=== In exile ===
In 1929, Besednjak emigrated to Argentina, but already the following year he returned to Europe in order to work at the Congress of European National Minorities in Vienna, serving as its vice-president. Afterwards, he moved to the Kingdom of Yugoslavia, settling in Belgrade. Throughout the interwar period, he remained a member of the Slovene People's Party, supporting its centrist faction led by the Christian Democratic politician Andrej Gosar. After 1935, when the party leadership decided to support with the conservative Yugoslav government of Milan Stojadinović, Besednjak became increasingly critical of its policies. Although he remained a member of the Slovene People's Party, he became disenchanted with its authoritarian and corporatist shift.

He spent the World War II years in Belgrade. Although he did not join any of the political factions fighting against the German occupation of Yugoslavia. Initially, he rejected both the partisan movement and Draža Mihajlović's Chetniks, as well as the various collaborationist militias (such as the Slovene Home Guard). After 1943, he collaborated with the so-called "Catholic Centre", led by Jakob Šolar and Andrej Gosar in the Province of Ljubljana, and Virgil Šček in the Julian March, trying to keep a balance between the pro-Communist Liberation Front of the Slovenian People and various anti-Communist forces. After 1944, however, he became increasingly supportive of Josip Broz Tito's partisan movement, believing that the Communists would be the only force able to achieve the annexation of the Slovenian Littoral and Istria to Yugoslavia, as well as the only ones capable to keep the country together.

=== Return to the Julian March ===
With the Paris Treaty of 1947, the Istrian peninsula and most of the Slovenian Littoral were annexed to the Socialist Federal Republic of Yugoslavia. Gorizia and the Slovene-inhabited Venetian Slovenia remained part of Italy, while Trieste and the neighbouring villages were included in the Allied-administered Free Territory of Trieste. In 1950, Besednjak settled in Trieste. There, he was among the co-founders of the Slovene Christian Social Union, which later merged with other Slovene democratic and anti-Communist parties in Italy into the Slovene Union. After the annexation of the Province of Trieste to Italy in 1954, he retired from public life. In the late 1950s, he published a memoir dedicated to his friend and collaborator Virgil Šček. The text remains, to this day, one of the most comprehensive sources on the Slovene and Croat political movement in the Julian March under the Kingdom of Italy.

He died in Trieste in 1968.

== See also ==
- Josip Ferfolja
- Boris Furlan
- TIGR

== Sources ==
- Egon Pelikan, Engelbert Besednjak v parlamentu - Discorsi parliamentari dell'on. Engelbert Besednjak (Trieste: Krožek za družbena vprašanja Virgil Šček, 1996).
