= Šentvid pri Planini =

Šentvid pri Planini Sveti Vid pri Planini (until 1955)
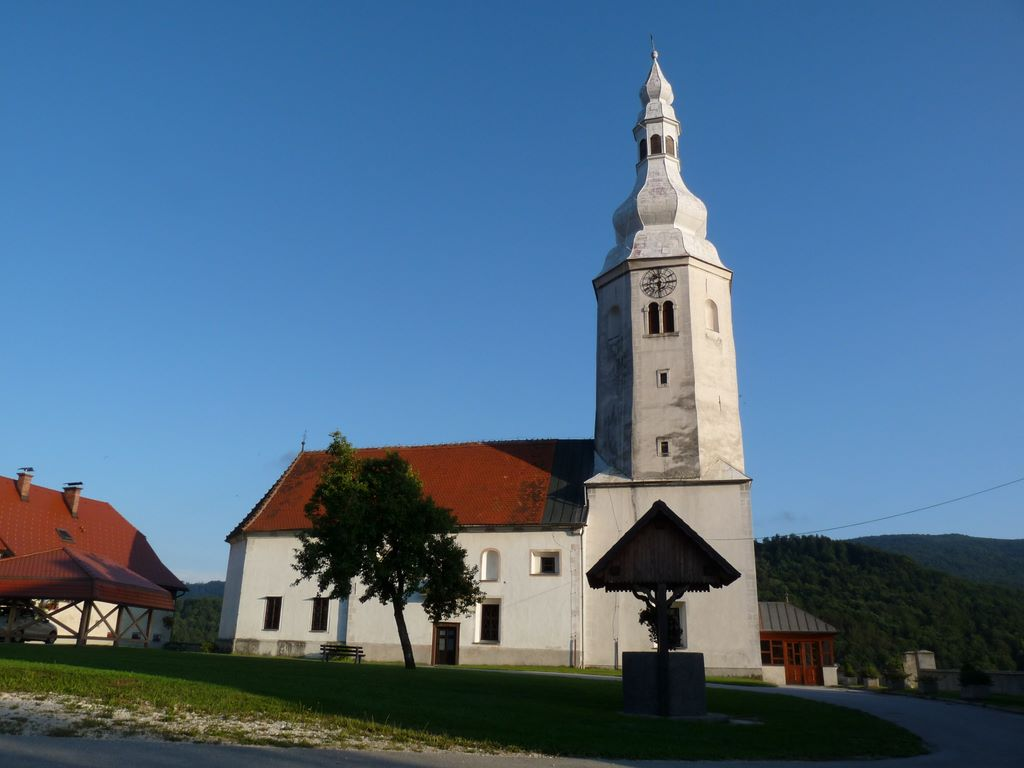
- St. Vitus's Parish Church

- Location in Slovenia
- Coordinates: 46°5′29.32″N 15°26′4.72″E
- Country: Slovenia
- Traditional region: Styria
- Statistical region: Savinja
- Municipality: Šentjur

Area
  - Total: 2.64 km^{2} (1.02 sq mi)
- Elevation: 569.4 m (1,868 ft)

Population (2020)
  - Total: 121
  - Density: 45.8/km^{2} (119/sq mi)

Šentvid pri Planini (pronounced [sɛnˈtʋiːt pɾi plaˈniːni] or [sənˈtʋiːt pɾi plaˈniːni]) is a village east of Planina pri Sevnici in the Municipality of Šentjur, eastern Slovenia. The settlement, and the entire municipality, are included in the Savinja Statistical Region, which is in the Slovenian portion of the historical Duchy of Styria.

== Name ==
The name of the settlement was changed from Sveti Vid pri Planini (literally, 'Saint Vitus near Planina') to Šentvid pri Planini in 1955. The name was changed on the basis of the 1948 Law on Names of Settlements and Designations of Squares, Streets, and Buildings as part of efforts by Slovenia's postwar communist government to remove religious elements from toponyms.

== Churches ==
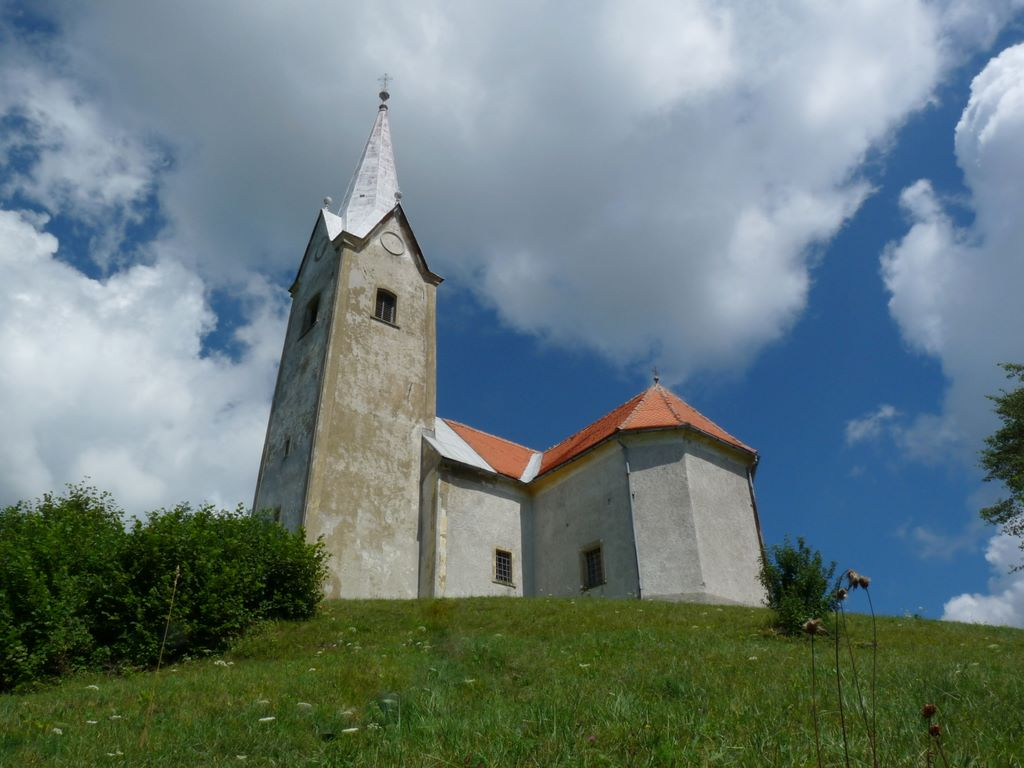
Holy Cross Church

There are two churches in the settlement. The parish church from which the settlement gets its name is dedicated to Saint Vitus (Slovene: sveti Vid) and belongs to the Roman Catholic Diocese of Celje. It is a 15th-century building with 17th-century additions. A second church, to the west of the settlement core, is dedicated to the Holy Cross. It is a 15th-century building much modified in the 18th century.
