= Social Democratic Party of Croatia and Slavonia =

Social Democratic Party of Croatia and Slavonia Socijaldemokratska stranka Hrvatske i Slavonije
- Abbreviation: SDSHiS
- President: Vitomir Korać
- Founded: 1894
- Dissolved: 1916
- Succeeded by: Socialist Labour Party of Yugoslavia (Communists) (partial)
- Ideology: Social democracy Austromarxism
- Political position: Left-wing
- International affiliation: Second International

The Social Democratic Party of Croatia and Slavonia (Croatian: Socijaldemokratska stranka Hrvatske i Slavonije, SDSHiS) was a social-democratic political party in the Kingdom of Croatia-Slavonia. The party was active from 1894 until 1916.

== History ==
The Social Democratic Party of Hungary, founded in Budapest in 1890, consisted, among others, of Croatian socialists. After the Congress of the Social Democratic Party of Hungary in 1894, the socialists from the Kingdom of Croatia-Slavonia founded a separate Social Democratic Party on 8 and 9 September 1894. This was the first Workers' Party on Yugoslav soil. The party was initially led by Ivan Ancel, and after 1901, Vilim Bukšeg and Vitomir Korać.

Given the relative underdevelopment and lack of industry within Croatia at the time, and the small number of working class people, the party had a rather small number of members. Nevertheless, the party organised massive strikes in Slavonia in 1897. The relatively large number of party members at that time consisted mostly of foreign workers and Germans. Because of this, and its advocation of Austromarxism, the party was marginalized. During the 1890s, the labor movement in Croatia had more assets in Zagreb and Rijeka. However, at the beginning of the 20th century, the party began to gradually grow and gain more support in other parts of Croatia, especially in Sisak, where Josip Broz Tito, who later become president of SFR Yugoslavia, joined the SDSHiS in 1910.

The party objected to the 1914 preparations of the attack by the Austro-Hungarian Army on the Kingdom of Serbia. This led to a government ban on all organizations of the labor movement and the trade union press. The army mobilized more than 50% of party members which led to the party becoming inactive during the First World War. At the end of the First World War, the party abandoned Austromarxism. After the collapse of the Austro-Hungarian Empire and the creation of the Kingdom of Yugoslavia, the party fell apart. One part of its membership, led by Vitomir Korać, decided to operate in the People's Committees, in order to thus fit into the new state structure, while the second part, led by Đuro Cvijić and Vladimir Ćopić, rejected reformism, and had become members of the Socialist Labour Party of Yugoslavia (Communists) in 1919.

Yugoslav historiography often stated that the "majority", the left wing of the party, sent the delegation to the national congress in Belgrade, and that Đuro Cvijić, at that time secretary of the Zagreb organization, protested against its "opportunistic" leadership.

== Newsletters ==
The first newsletter of the labor movement in Croatia-Slavonia was Sloboda ("Freedom"; 1892–1902). The main Croatian socialist newspaper was Slobodna riječ ("Free word"; 1902–1914). Other notable newsletters were Razredne borbe ("Class struggles"; 1907), Pravo naroda ("Right of nation"; Šid and Zagreb, 1908–1912), written in Cyrillic, and the German-language "Volksrecht" (Zagreb and Osijek, 1908–1912), among others.

== Legacy ==
The Social Democratic Party of Croatia (SDS), founded in 1990, is regarded as the successor to the SDSHiS. The hundredth anniversary of the establishment of the SDSHiS was chosen as the date on which the SDS merged into the Social Democratic Party of Croatia (SDP).

== Literature ==
- Vitomir Korać, Povijest radničkog pokreta u Hrvatskoj i Slavoniji (book no. 1). „Radnički sindikati“, Zagreb, 1930
- Istorija Saveza komunista Jugoslavije. Izdavački centar „Komunist“, „Narodna knjiga“, „Rad“ Beograd, 1985
