= Šentvid pri Lukovici =

- Village
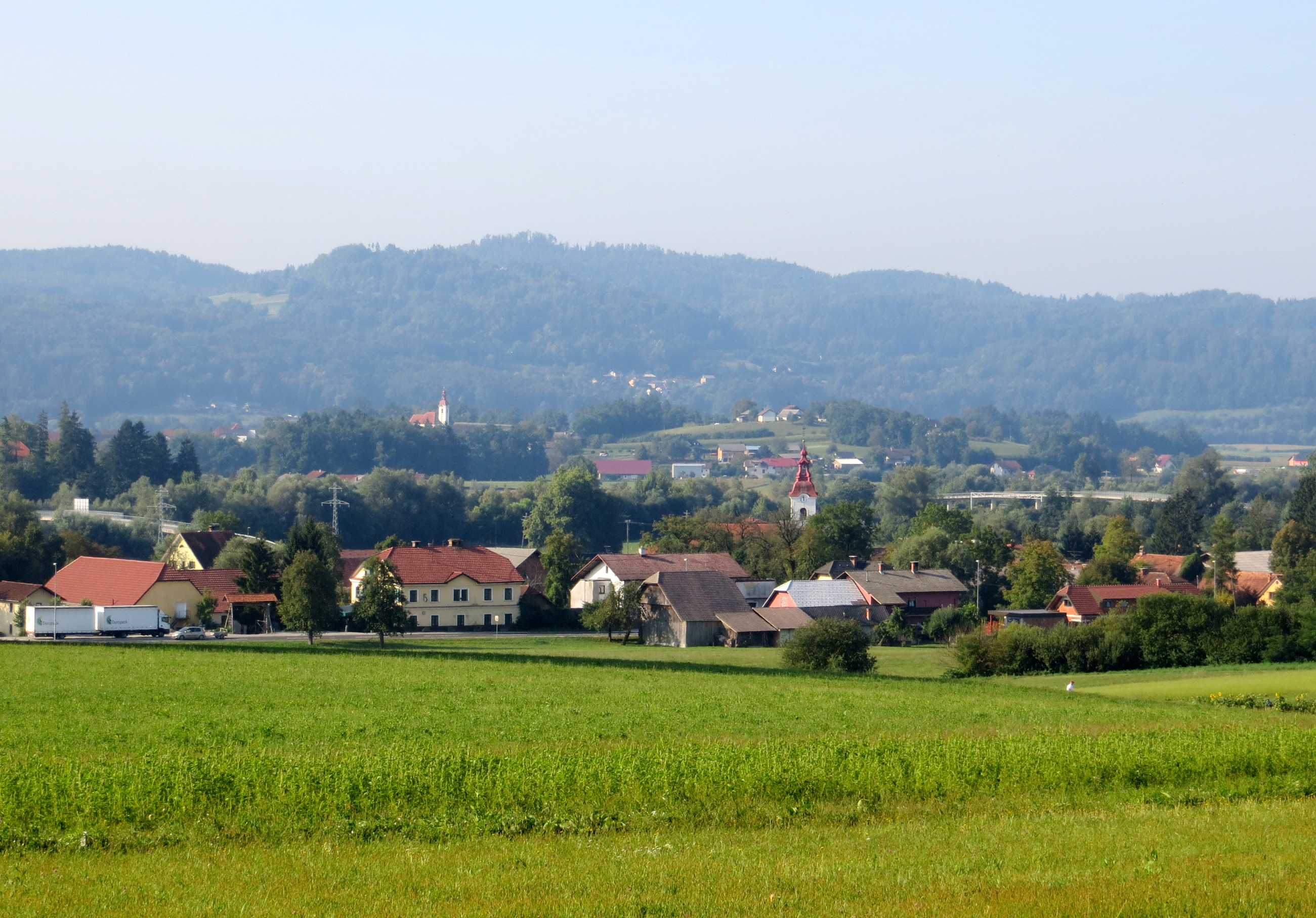

- Location in Slovenia
- Coordinates: 46°9′46.28″N 14°40′29.06″E
- Country: Slovenia
- Traditional region: Upper Carniola
- Statistical region: Central Slovenia
- Municipality: Lukovica

Area
  - Total: 0.66 km^{2} (0.25 sq mi)
- Elevation: 329.7 m (1,082 ft)

Population (2002)
  - Total: 208

Šentvid pri Lukovici (pronounced [ʃɛnˈtʋiːt pɾi ˈluːkɔʋitsi] or [ʃənˈtʋiːt pɾi ˈluːkɔʋitsi]; German: Sankt Veit) is a settlement in the Municipality of Lukovica in the eastern part of the Upper Carniola region of Slovenia.

== Name ==
The name of the settlement was changed from Šent Vid to Šentvid pri Lukovici in 1955. In the past the German name was Sankt Veit.

== Church ==
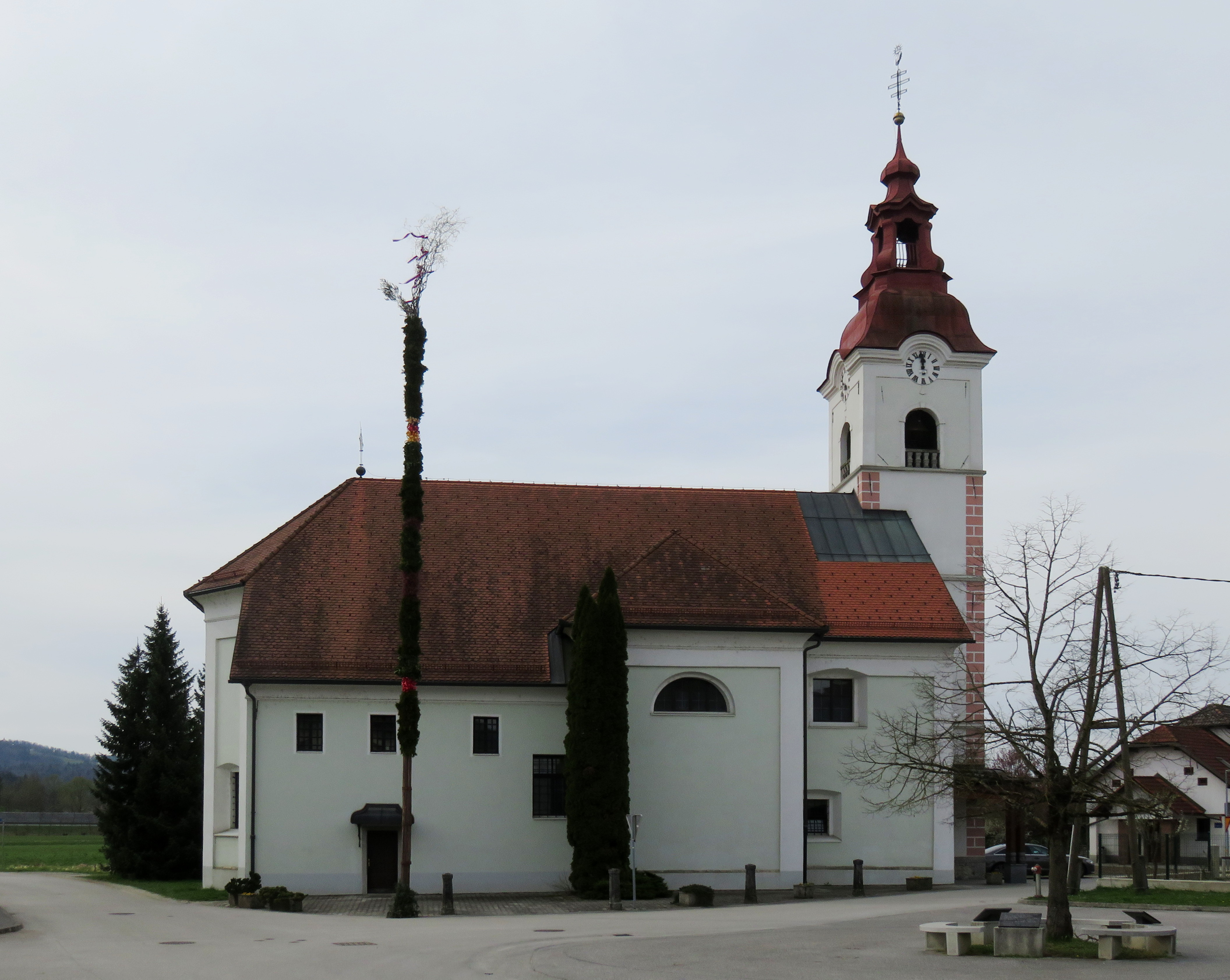
Saint Vitus's Church

The local church, which the settlement gets its name from, is dedicated to Saint Vitus (Slovene: sveti Vid).
