= Milko Brezigar =

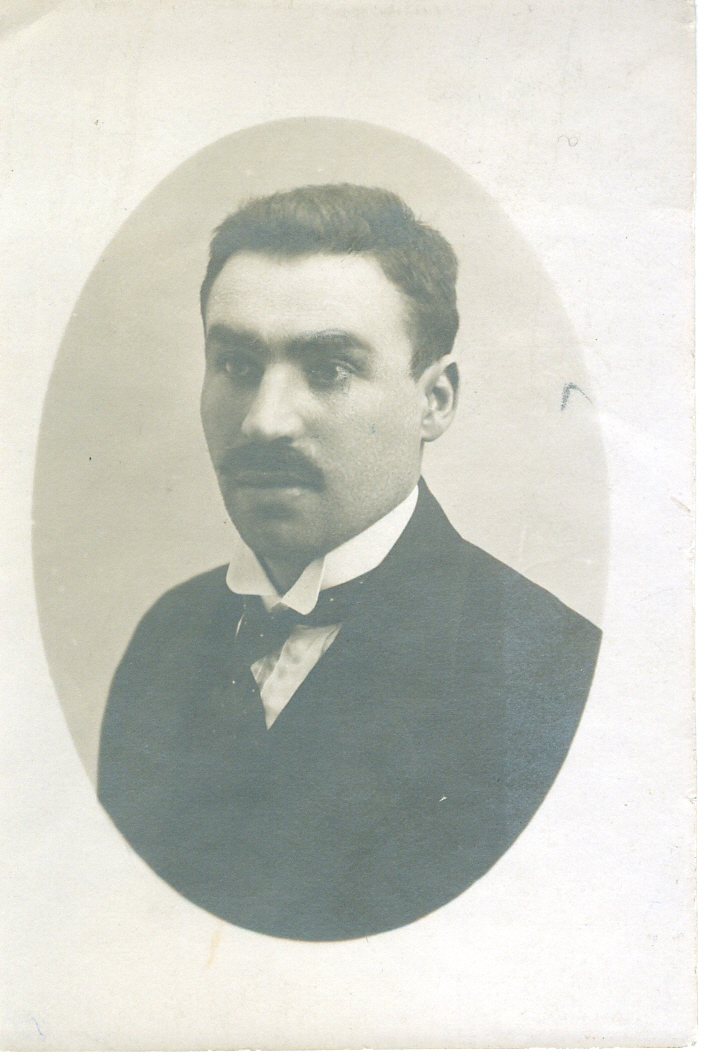

Milko Brezigar (6 October 1886 – 22 April 1958) was a Slovene and Yugoslav liberal economist.

== Biography ==
Born to a Slovene family the village of Doberdò del Lago (Slovene: Doberdob) in the Austrian Littoral (now part of Italy), he attended the State gymnasium in Gorizia. He studied law at the universities of Graz and Vienna, graduating in 1910. In 1911, he started publishing articles on economic policies and economic theory. In 1914, he became the editor of the economic section of the Viennese newspaper Reichspost.

During World War I, Brezigar maintained close contacts with the Yugoslav Committee through his friend, the Slovene émigré Bogomil Vošnjak; together with Janko Hacin, Brezigar was among the organizers of a secret network which made espionage on behalf of the Entente against the Austro-Hungarian Empire

After the establishment of the State of Slovenes, Croats and Serbs in October 1918, he moved to Ljubljana. In 1919, he was member of the Yugoslav delegation at the Versailles conference. In the same period, he joined the Yugoslav Democratic Party, and was elected member of the Temporary Representative Assembly. As a close collaborator of the Slovenian liberal leader Gregor Žerjav, Brezigar was influential in composing the Democratic Party's economic program, which was based on economic liberalism, but favoured state economic protectionism against foreign capital. In this period, he published his most important work, An Outline of the Slovenian National Economy (1918).

In 1920, he was named professor at the University of Ljubljana, where he was among the founders of the Slovenian economic science. During this period, he did not engage in active politics, although he remained a member of the Democratic and later Independent Democratic Party

After the establishment of the Communist system in 1945, he left Yugoslavia and settled in Austria, dying in Salzburg in 1958.

== Major works ==
- Vorboten einer Wirtschaftskrise Deutschlands. Anwendung an die jetztige Wirtschaftslage (Berlin, 1913);
- Die Konjunktur- und Depressionswellen in Oesterreich seit 1896 (Vienna, 1913);
- Osnutek slovenskega narodnega gospodarstva (Celje, 1918).

== See also ==
- Liberalism in Slovenia

== Sources ==
- Primorski slovenski bibliografski leksikon: 'Milko Brezigar' (in Slovene)
