= Yugoslav Social-Democratic Party =

Political party

Yugoslav Social-Democratic Party Jugoslovanska socialdemokratska stranka Jugoslavenska socijaldemokratska stranka
- Founded: 1898
- Dissolved: 18 December 1921
- Preceded by: Social Democratic Party of Austria
- Merged into: Socialist Party of Yugoslavia (Majority); League of Communists of Yugoslavia (Minority)
- Newspaper: Rdeči prapor Zarja
- Ideology: Socialism; Yugoslavism
- Political position: Left-wing

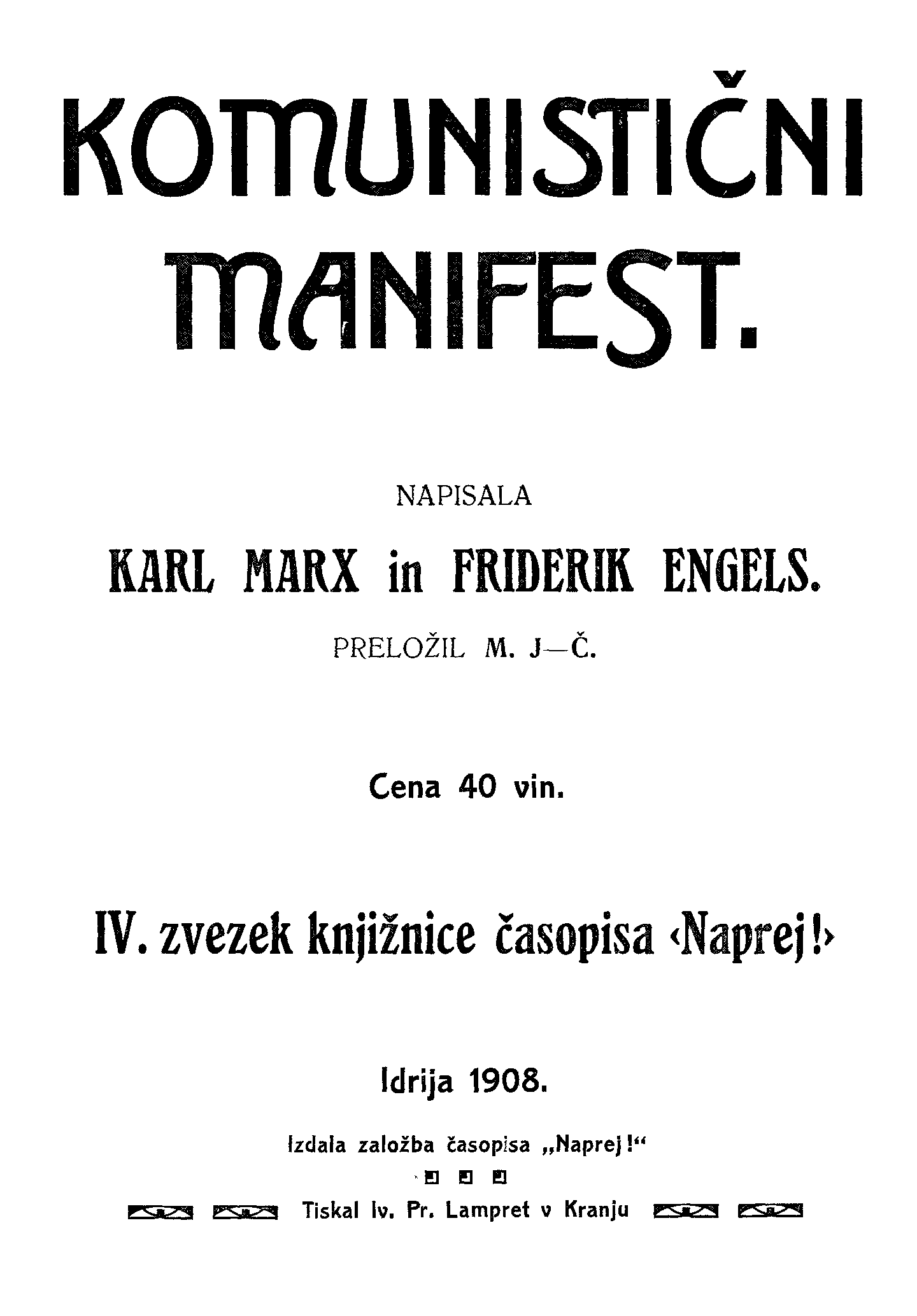
A Slovene translation of Marx's and Engels' Communist Manifesto published in the Carniolan mining town of Idrija in 1908.

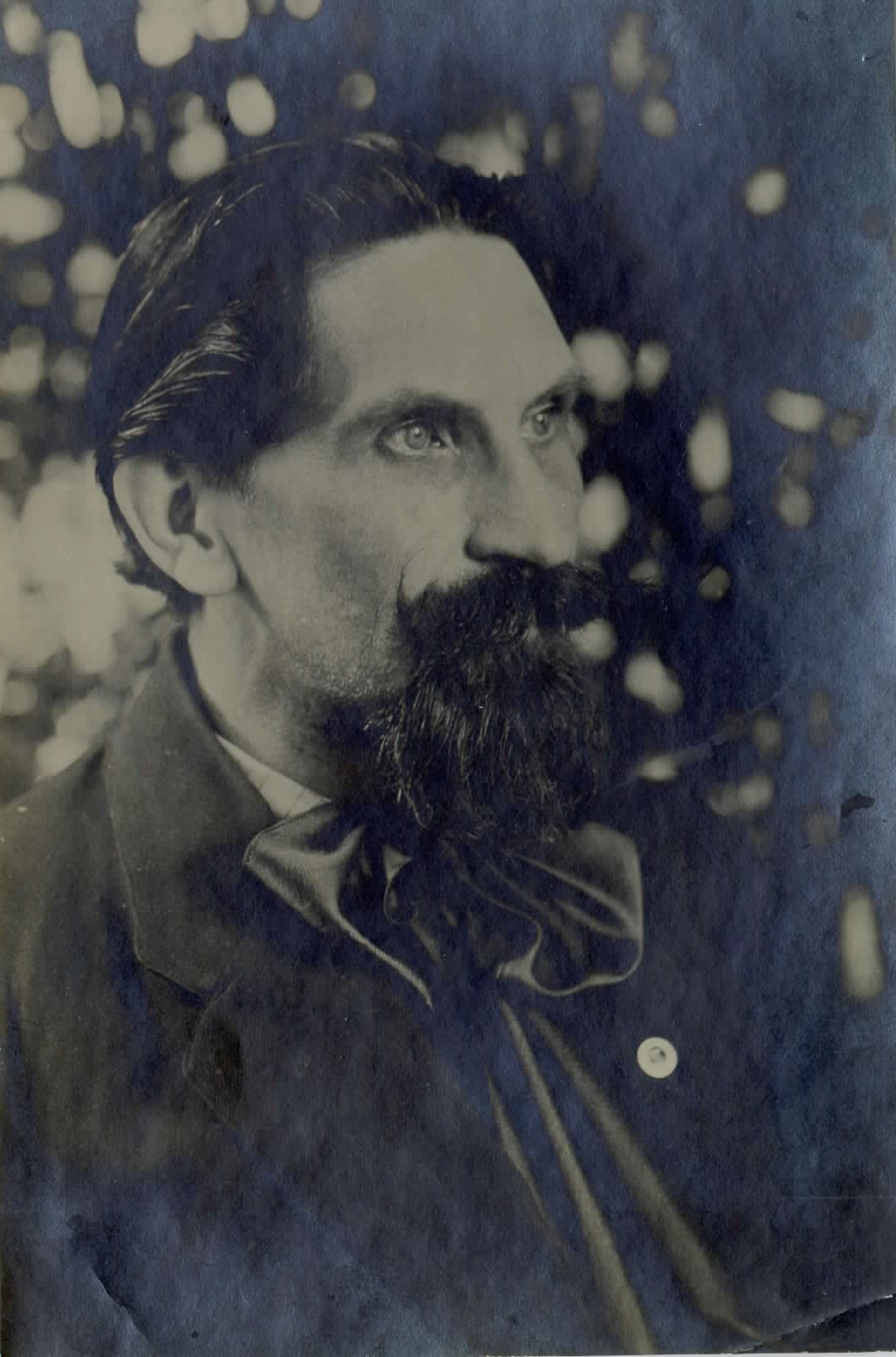
Etbin Kristan, an important Slovenian member of the JSDS

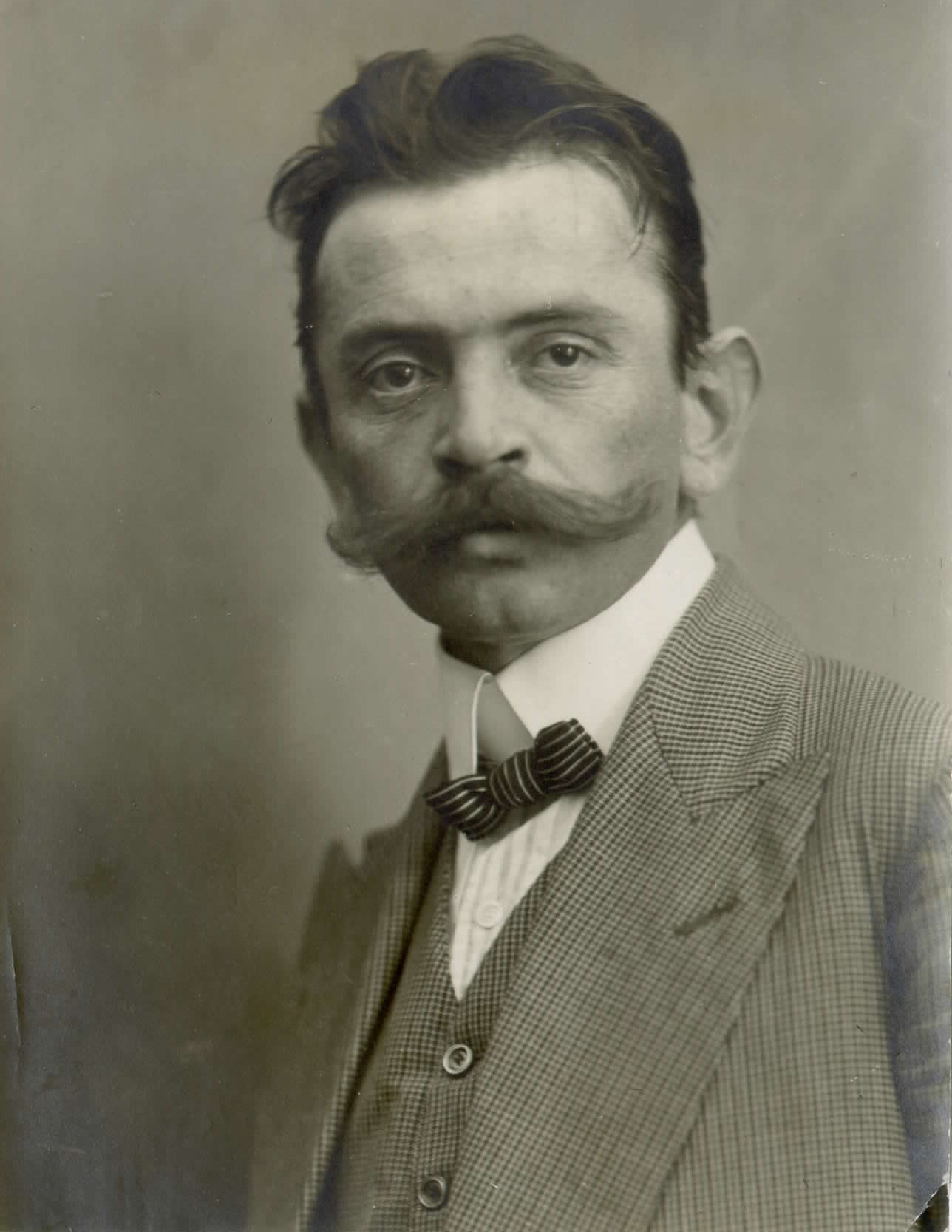
Ivan Cankar, one of the most important Slovenian authors, a supporter of JSDS

Yugoslav Social-Democratic Party (Slovene: Jugoslovanska socialdemokratska stranka, Croatian: Jugoslavenska socijaldemokratska stranka) or JSDS was a socialist political party in Slovenia and Istria within the Austro-Hungarian Empire and the Kingdom of Yugoslavia. It was founded in 1898 in Trieste.

In 1909, the party issued its 'Tivoli resolution', calling for the cultural and political unification of all South Slavs. However, the party also sought limited Slovenian autonomy at the 1921 Yugoslav Constituent Assembly. Its long-term goal was ending the oppressive capitalist system in favour of a more equal one, but it also pursued more immediate goals of the uplift of the working class, democratisation of political life, equal and general voting rights, etc.

JSDS founded many trade unions and workers' cooperatives. It also supported and organised general strikes in Trieste, Jesenice, Hrastnik, Trbovlje, etc. Although the party did not appeal to farmers, and many workers were instead won over by the liberals and conservative Catholic parties, the JSDS grew in strength and scope. After universal manhood suffrage was passed in Austria, the Yugoslav Social-Democratic Party became a significant political force.

== Organs ==
On March 18, 1898, the party organ Rdeči prapor (Red Flag) began publishing in Trieste. Josip Zavertanik and Josip Kopač were its main editors. On October 20, 1905, the editorial office shifted to Ljubljana. Zarja (Dawn) was founded in 1911 as a party organ. In 1914 the newspaper shifted to Trieste, and ceased to be an official party organ.

== Legacy ==
Between 1990 and 2002, the Social Democratic Party of Slovenia regarded itself as the moral and spiritual heir of the Yugoslav Social Democratic Party.

== Prominent members ==
- Etbin Kristan
- Josip Ferfolja
- Ivan Cankar
- Dragotin Lončar
- Albin Prepeluh
