= France Pibernik =

Slovene poet, author, essayist, and literary historian (1928–2021)

- Born: November 22, 1928; Suhadole, Kingdom of Yugoslavia
- Died: April 21, 2021 (aged 92); Kranj, Slovenia

France Pibernik (September 2, 1928 – April 21, 2021) was a Slovene poet, author, essayist, and literary historian.

== Life ==
Pibernik was born in Suhadole. He attended high school in Kranj and then enrolled in Slavic studies in Ljubljana, where he graduated in 1955. Until 1958 he taught at a middle school at Dobrovo in the Gorizia Hills, and after that at the high school in Kranj until his retirement in 1990. In the foreword to his book Janez Jalen, it is written about Pibernik that "as for many knowledgeable and intellectually diverse people, it is also true of him that, in the years when their work lives are no longer at the forefront, they are even more active and productive."

== Literary activity ==
Initially, Pibernik's poetry was close to Neo-Romantic currents, and it later developed in the direction of Modernism. His first poetry collection, Bregovi ulice (1960), was followed by more volumes, among which his poetry collection Ajdova znamenja is the most notable. The most important part of Pibernik's works on literature are the volumes Med tradicijo in modernizmom (Between Tradition and Modernism), Med modernizmom in avantgardo (Between Modernism and the Avant-Garde), and Čas romana (The Era of the Novel). The first two present the author's correspondence with poets, and Čas romana with the prose writers. As a literary historian, Pibernik focused on work written during the Second World War and by Slovenes in exile, which was suppressed in Slovenia for political and ideological reasons. These include volumes on the poetry of France Balantič and Ivan Hribovšek, the anthology Jutro pozabljenih (Dawn of the Forgotten, 1991), the volume Temni zaliv Franceta Balantiča (The Dark Bay of France Balantič), his study Slovenski dunajski krog 1941–1945 (The Slovenian Vienna Circle, 1941–1945), and his biography of Karel Mauser.

== Poetry collections ==
- Bregovi ulice, 1960 (COBISS 25721857)
- Ravnina, 1968 (COBISS 2767368)
- Razlage, 1973
- September, 1974 (COBISS 1917704)
- Odzvok – pesmi v prozi, 1979 (COBISS 5131520)
- Ajdova znamenja – izbor, 1993 (COBISS 33625600)
- Svetloba timijan, 2000 (COBISS 108066816)

== Literary history ==
- Med tradicijo in modernizmom: pričevanja o sodobni poeziji, 1978 (COBISS 11257601)
- Med modernizmom in avantgardo: pričevanja o sodobni poeziji, 1981 (COBISS 12492033)
- Čas romana: pogovori s slovenskimi pisatelji, 1983 (COBISS 14049793)
- Temni zaliv Franceta Balantiča, 1989, 1990 (COBISS 45069312)
- Slovenski dunajski krog 1941–1945, 1991 (COBISS 23895552)
- Razmerja v sodobni slovenski dramatiki: pogovori, dopisovanja, razmišljanja, 1992 (COBISS 29041920)
- Karel Mauser: življenje in delo, 1993 (COBISS 33918720)
- Anton Vodnik, Zbrano delo (editor), 1993 (COBISS 34998272)
- Ogledala sanj Jožeta Udoviča: dokumenti, pričevanja, komentarji, 1996 (COBISS 62847744)
- Slovenska duhovna pesem: od Prešerna do danes, 2001 (COBISS 114737408)
- Beseda čez ocean: antologija slovenske zdomske pozije, 2002 (COBISS 118609408)
- Janez Jalen: življenjska in pisateljska pot v dokumentih, pričevanjih in razlagah, 2003 (COBISS 124374272)
- Začudene oči otroštva (memoir), 2008 (COBISS 240247808)
- France Balantič: življenjska in pesniška pot 1921–1943: literarna usoda po letu 1945, 2008 (COBISS 60995585)
- Jože Udovič: Udovičeva poezija med realnostjo in vizijo z dvema proznima intermezzoma, 2008 (COBISS 240870656)
- Ivan Hribovšek, Zbrano delo (editor), 2010 (COBISS 251243264)
- Vladimir Truhlar, Zbrano delo (editor), 2011 (COBISS 258675456)
- Vladimir Truhlar, 2016 (COBISS 258675456)
- Anton Vodnik, 2012 (COBISS 262209792)
- France Balantič, Zbrano delo (editor, series Zbrana dela slovenskih pesnikov in pisateljev), 2008 (COBISS 60833025)
- Severin Šali: popotnik, zaljubljen v življenje, 2019 (COBISS 301473536)

== Research on suppressed writers ==
In his last decade, Pibernik devoted himself mainly to researching the lives and works of writers that were politically banned and suppressed under the communist regime in Slovenia. He published many books on this topic, starting with an anthology:

- Jutro pozabljenih: antologija padlih, pobitih, prepovedanih, zamolčanih, pozabljenih, 1991 (COBISS 28176640)
- France Balantič, Tihi glas piščali (editor), 1991 COBISS 28163840
- Ivan Hribovšek, Himna večeru: izbrane pesmi (editor), 1993 (COBISS 35055360)
- France Kunstelj, Luč na mojem pragu: izbrane črtice in novele (editor), 1994 (COBISS 44538368)
- Ludve Potokar, Onstran samote (editor), 1995 (COBISS 50042880)
- Tone Polda, Moja Krnica, 1996 (COBISS 60155904)
- Pozni november za pesnika: biografska pripoved : France Balantič, 29. november 1921 – 24. november 1943, 2016 (COBISS 287299328)
- Dohojene stopinje: pogovori in dokumenti: 2000–2018 (with Zorko Simčič), 2019 (COBISS 299996928)
- Alojz Rebula: 1924-2018: dokumentarna monografija]] (1924–2018), 2019 (COBISS 10674924)
- Mož neuklonljivih ramen: pogovori s Francetom Pibernikom (junij–oktober 1998) (with Anton Drobnič), 2021 (COBISS 63596291)

== Recognitions and awards ==
- 2008: Trubar Award for exceptional contributions to the preservation of the Slovenian written cultural heritage, conferred by the National and University Library of Slovenia
- 2013: honorary citizen of Kranj
- Honorary member of the Celje Hermagoras Society
