= Janez Remic =

Slovene poet and literary critic (1921–1945)

- Born: June 11, 1921; Bohinjska Bistrica, Kingdom of Yugoslavia
- Died: June 1945 near Slovenj Gradec, Federal People's Republic of Yugoslavia
- Occupations: Poet and literary critic

Janez Remic (June 11, 1921 – June 1945) was a Slovene poet and literary critic.

== Life ==
Remic was born in Bohinjska Bistrica. After graduating from high school in 1940, he began studying classical philology at the University of Ljubljana. After the Axis takeover of Slovenia, he continued his studies in Vienna. He was drafted into the German army in May 1944, and he joined the Upper Carniolan Home Guard in March 1945. After retreating to Carinthia, he was returned to Slovenia from the camp at Viktring by British forces, and he is believed to have been murdered in early June 1945 during the mass killings near Slovenj Gradec.

== Literary work ==
Remic emerged from the literary circle that gathered around the newsletter Domače vaje, which was published by the students of the St. Stanislaus Institute. At first, he wrote poems and published them in Mentor, but then he was attracted to literary criticism, which he published in Dom in svet and Dejanje. While studying in Vienna, he devoted himself to the study of Plato and became the intellectual leader of a literary group there, with whom he published the underground newsletter Dunajske domače vaje in the spring of 1944. The most important part of Remič's literary work has been lost, but his diary (1942–1944) and letters to Ivan Hribovšek have been preserved.
