= List of cities and towns in Slovenia =

Map of cities in Slovenia with more than 10.000 inhabitants:
Population >100.000
Population 20.000-99.999
Population 10.000-19.999

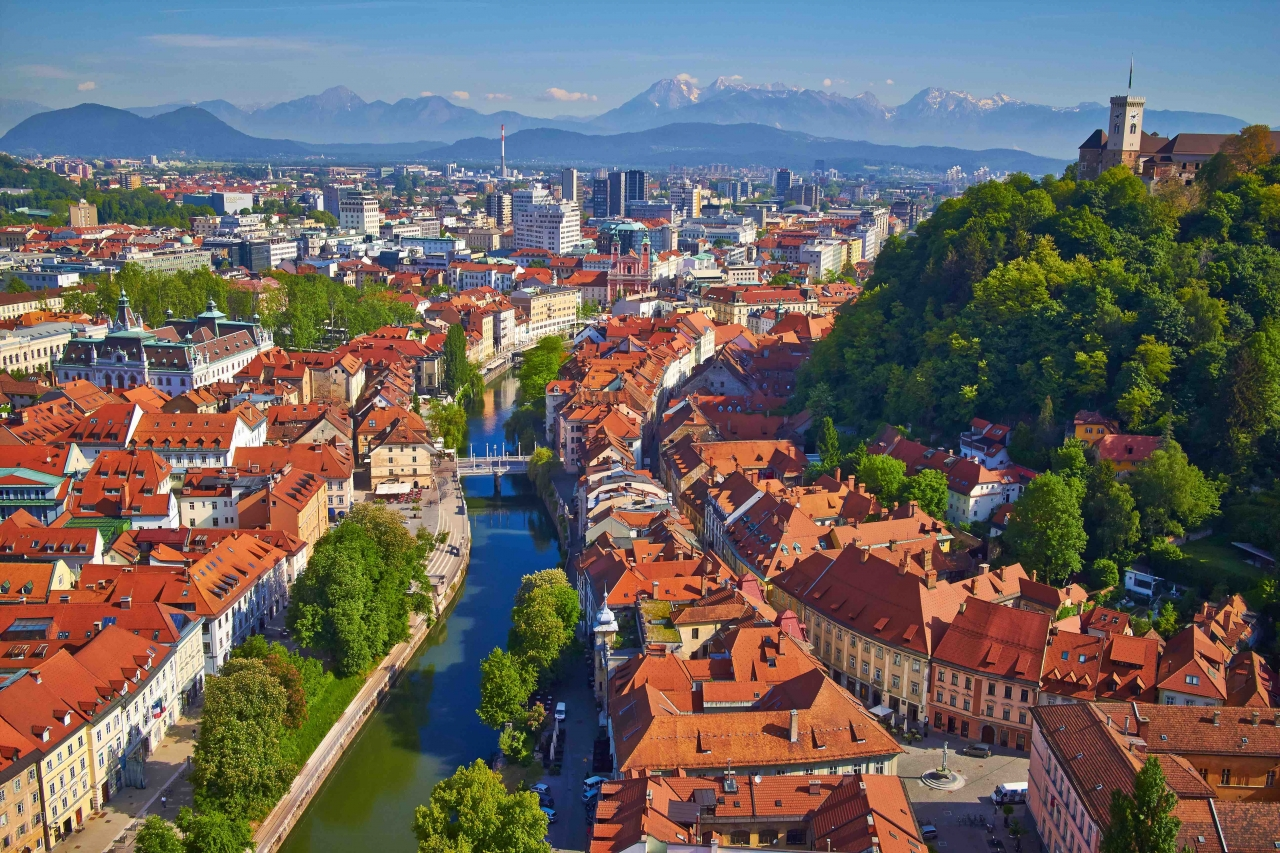
#1 Ljubljana

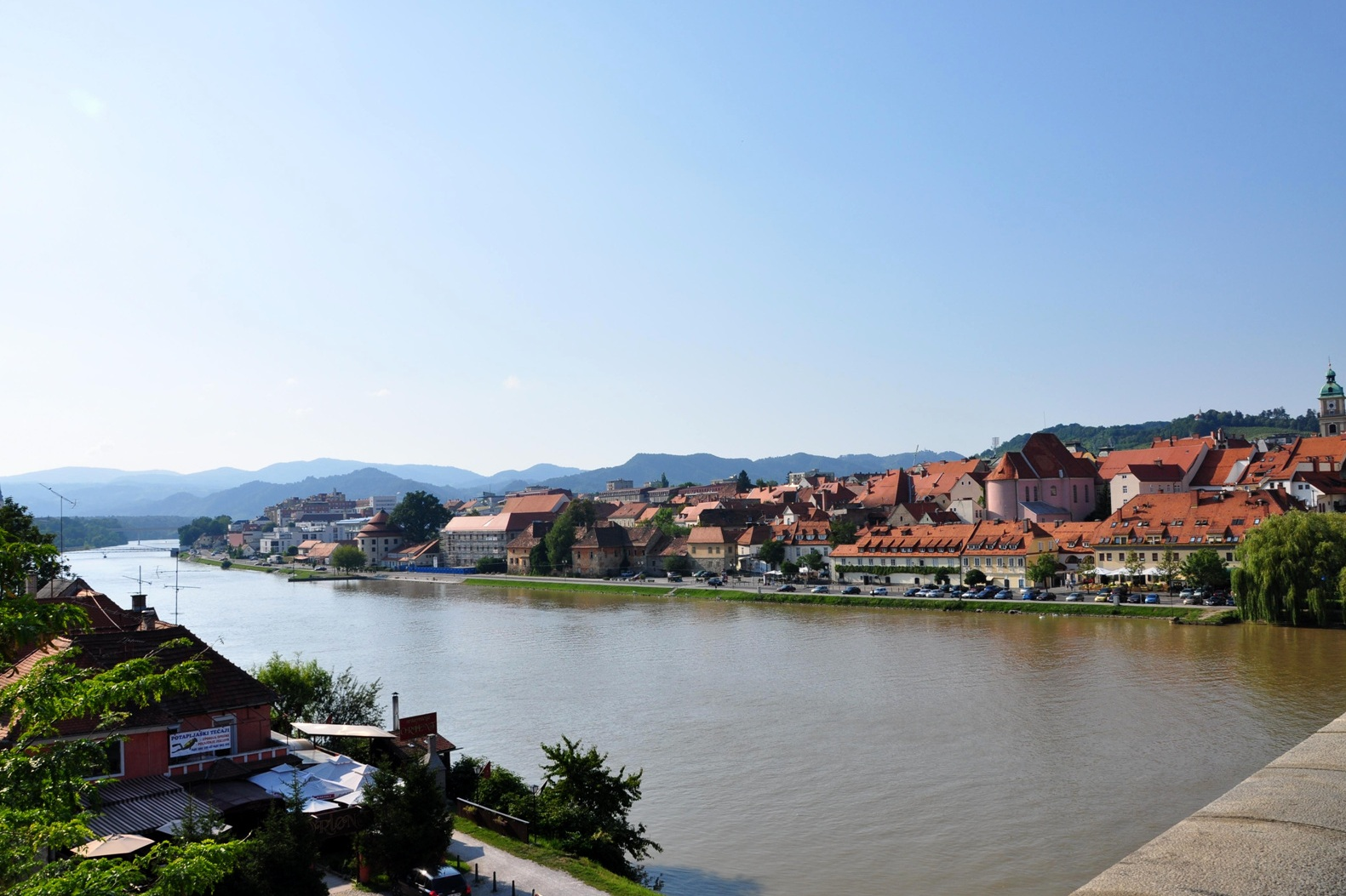
#2 Maribor

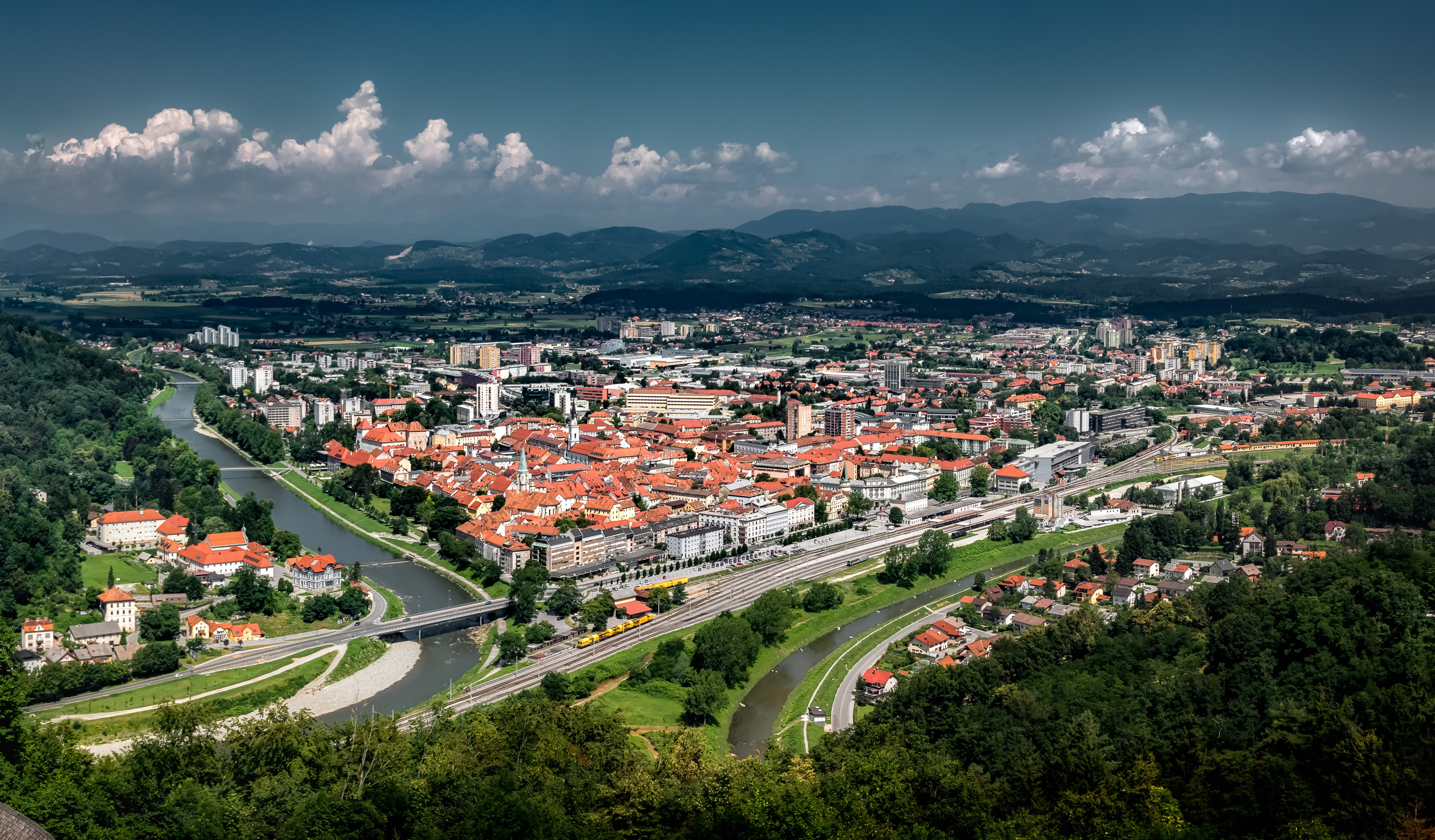
#3 Celje

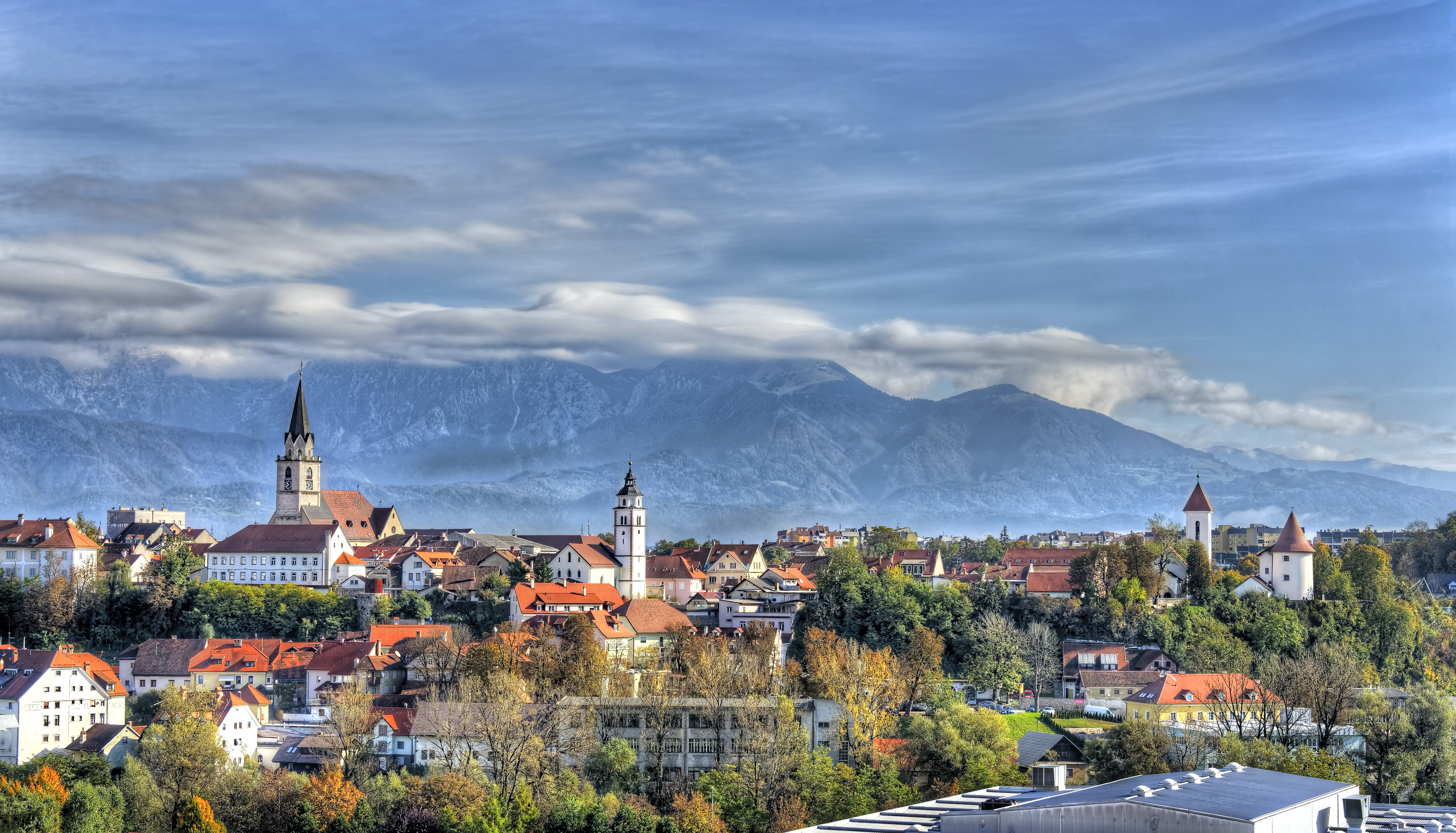
#4 Kranj

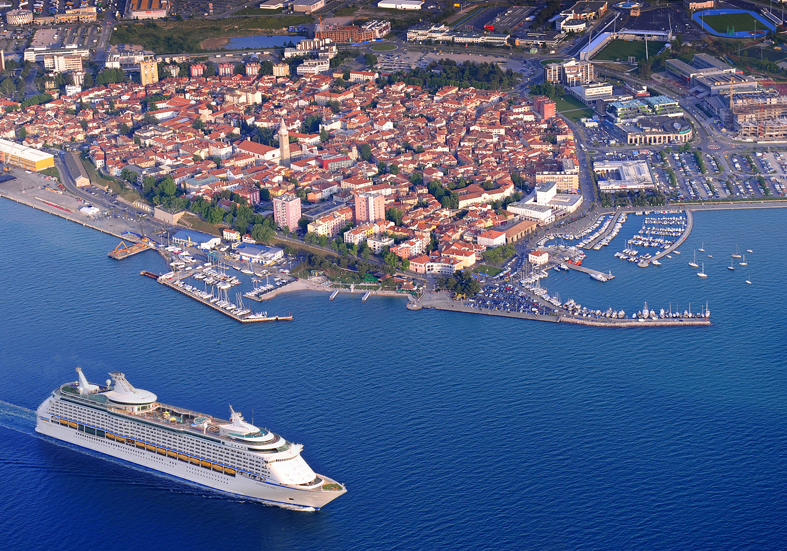
#5 Koper

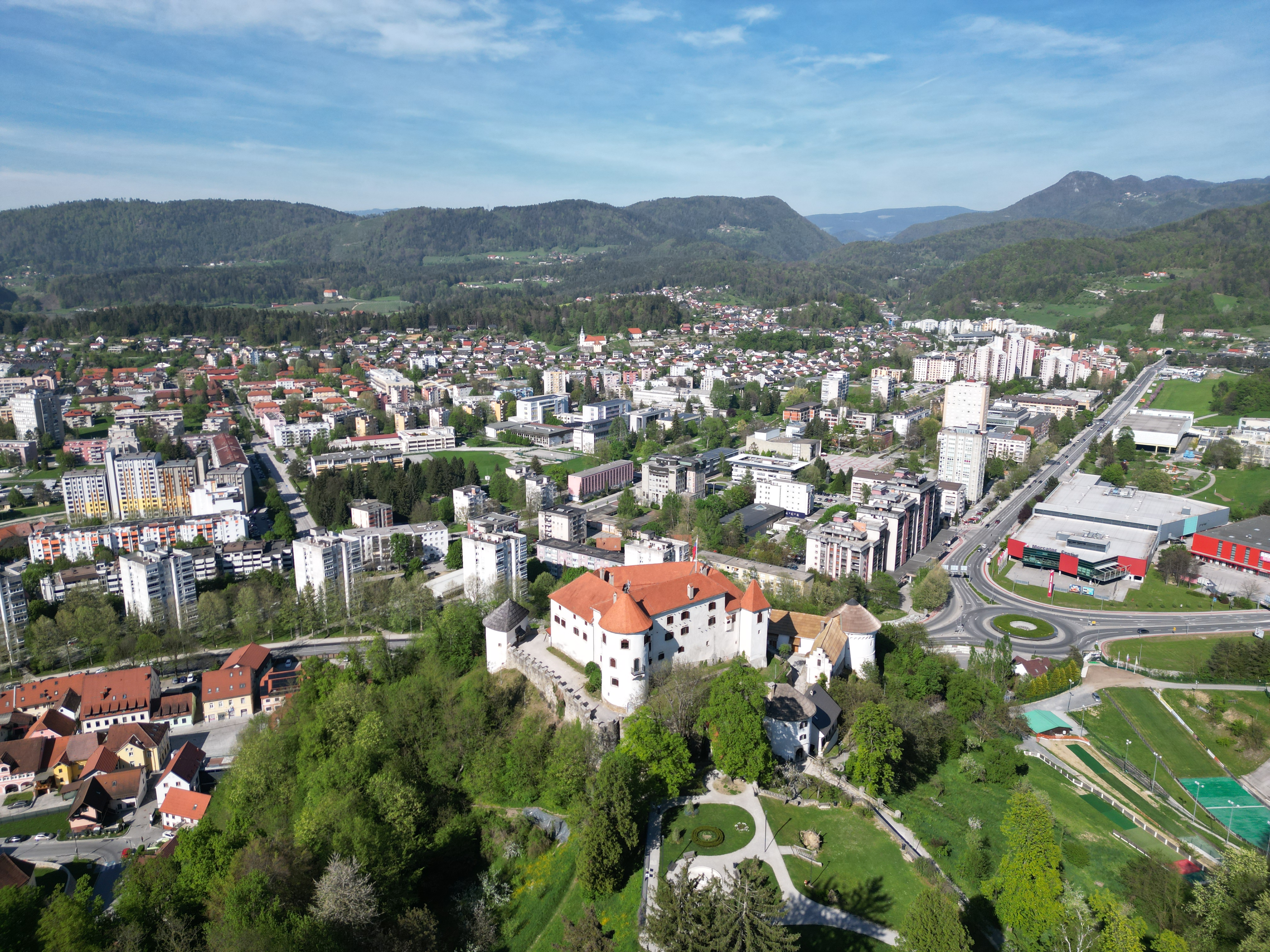
#6 Velenje

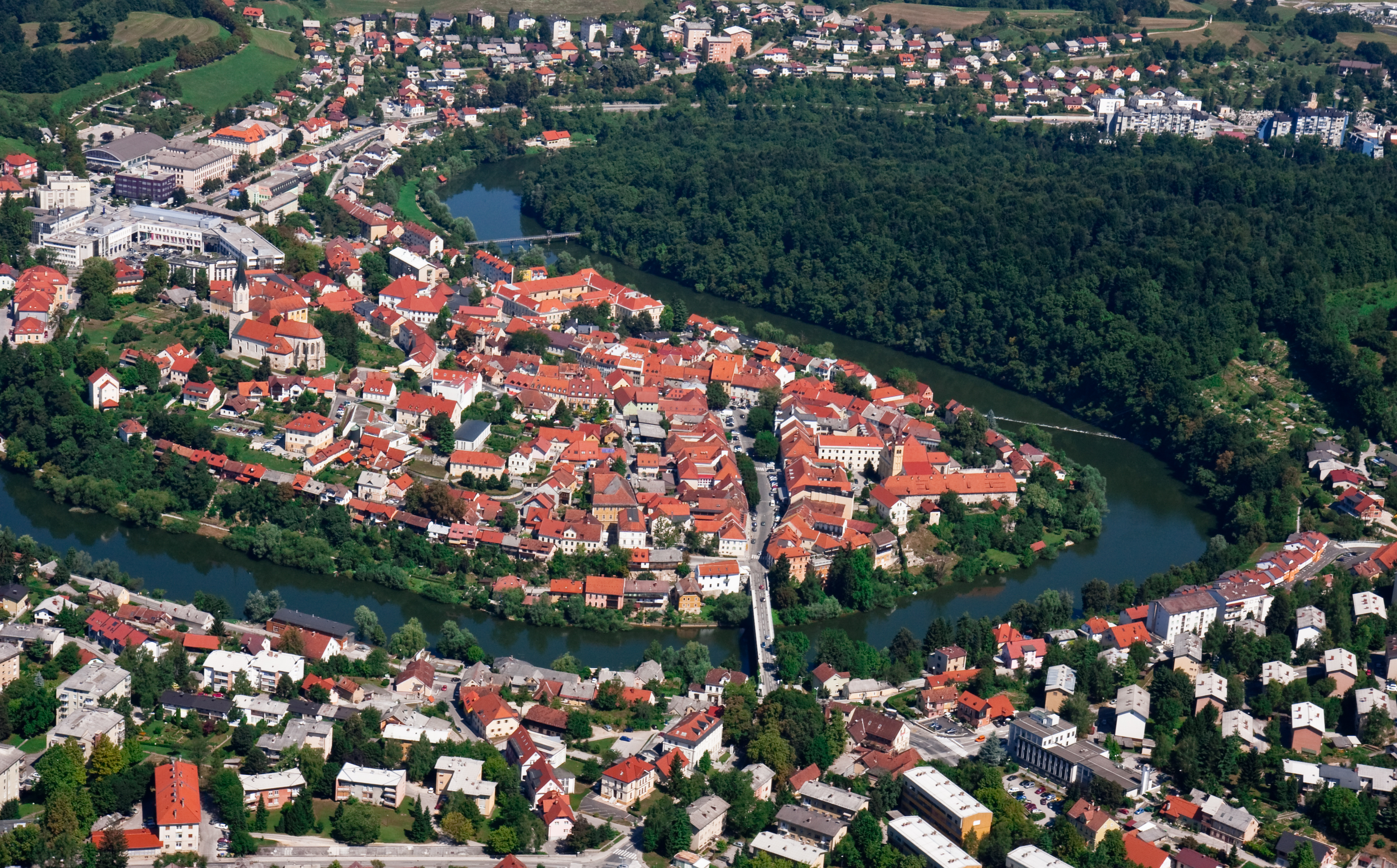
#7 Novo Mesto

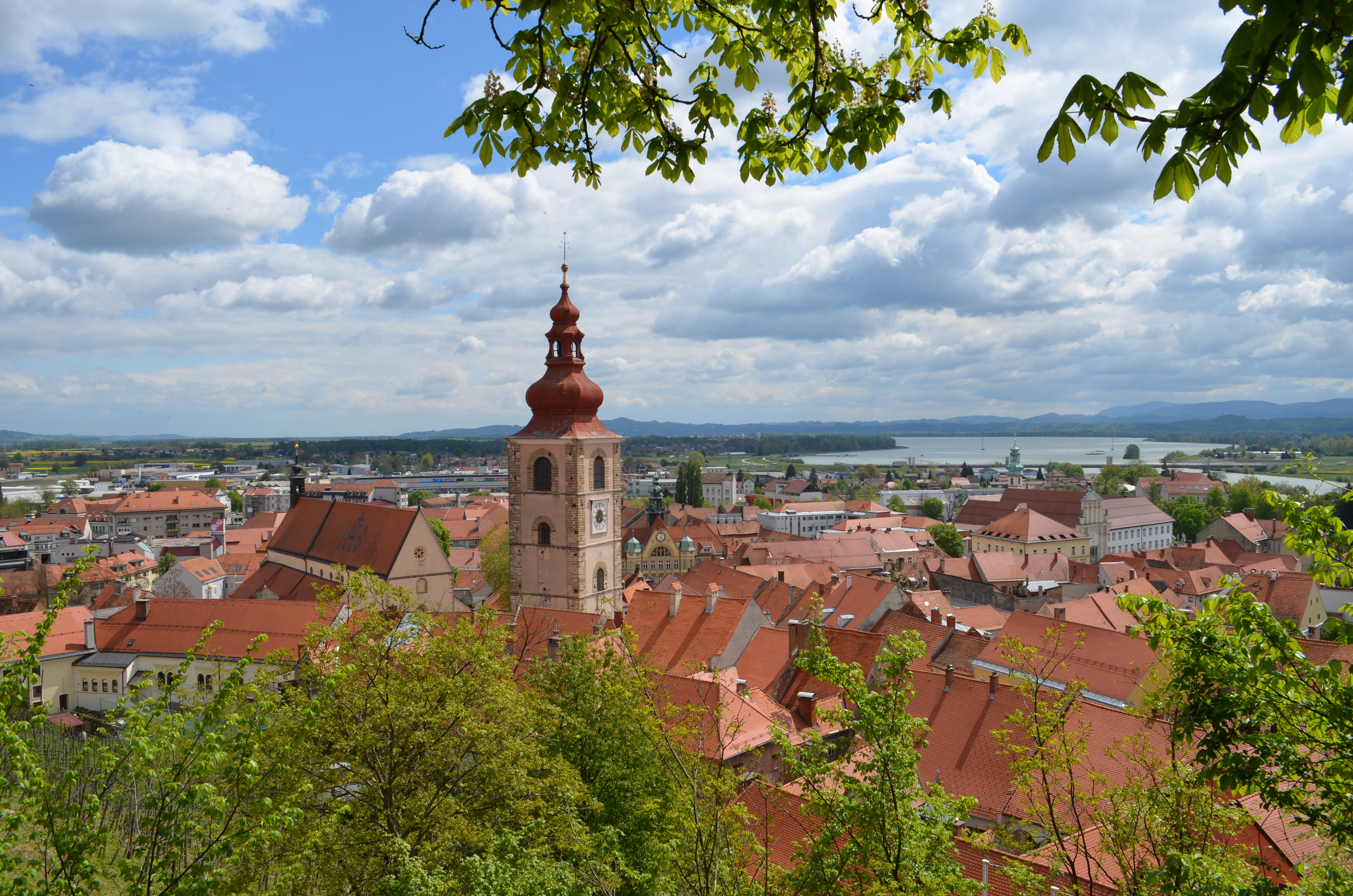
#8 Ptuj

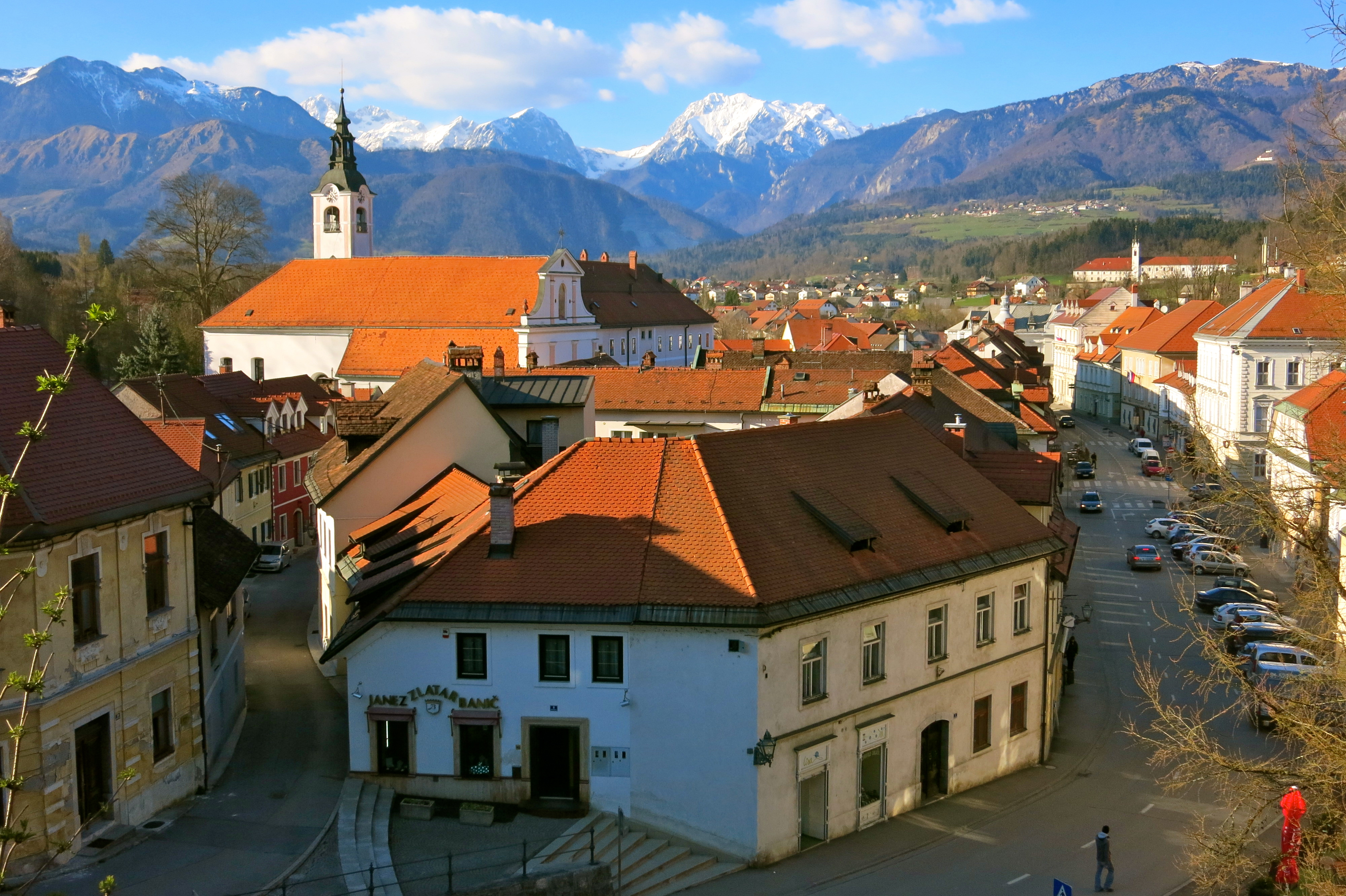
#9 Kamnik

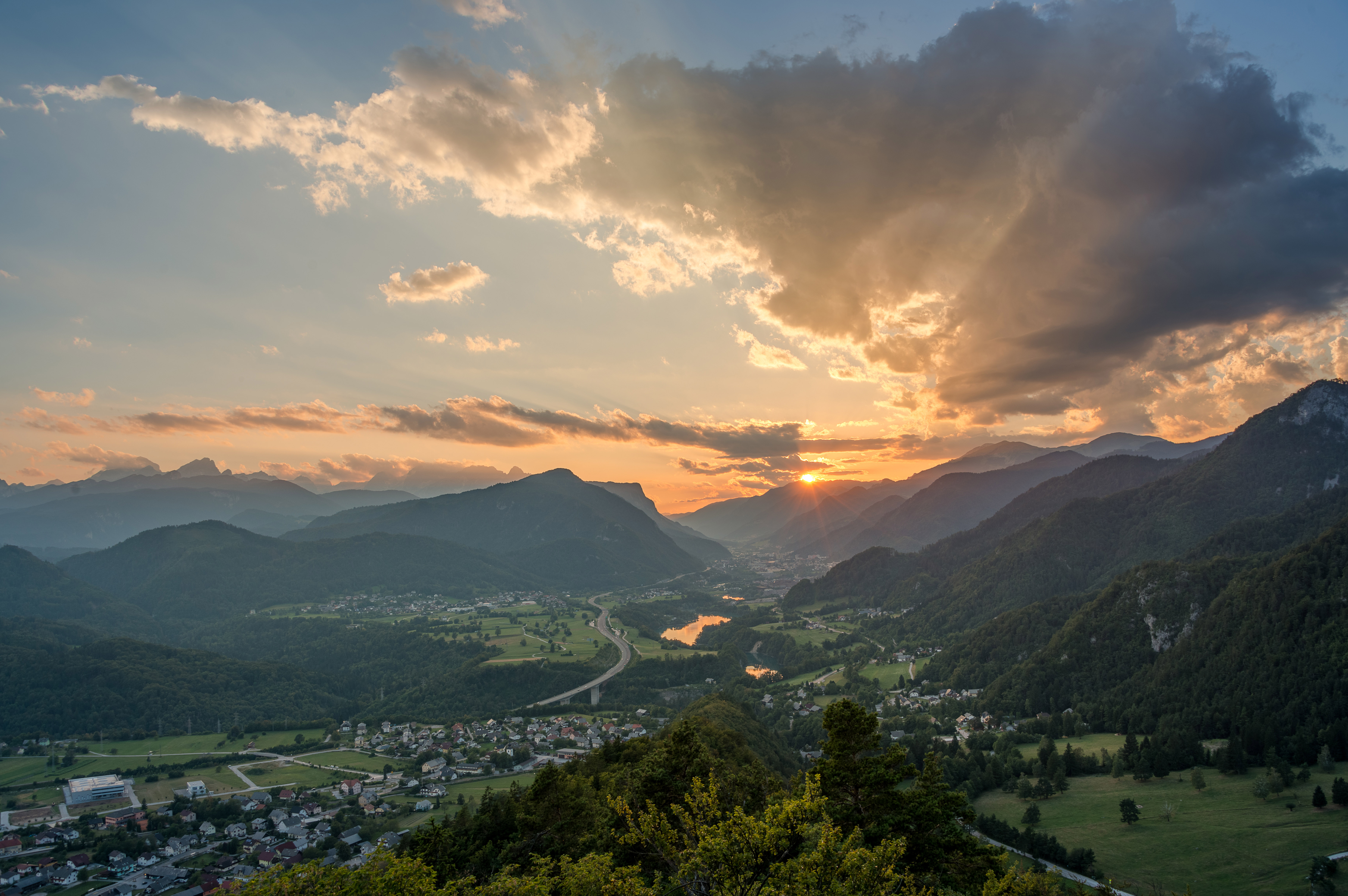
#10 Jesenice

There are 69 towns in Slovenia. According to the Local Self-Government Act of the Republic of Slovenia, a town is a larger urban settlement with more than 3,000 residents and differing from other settlements in its size, economical structure, population, population density and historical development. A settlement acquires the status of town through a decision by the Government of Slovenia. Until 2005, the decision was made by the National Assembly of Slovenia.

== List of all towns in Slovenia ==
Figures are based on the statistics from the Statistical Office of the Republic of Slovenia. Cities in bold are centres of urban municipalities.

Rank	Name	Population			Traditional region
Rank	Name	2026 pop.	2011 pop.	Percentage change	Traditional region
1.	**Ljubljana**	293,244	272,220	▲7.44%	Upper and Lower Carniola
2.	**Maribor**	98,097	95,171	▲3.03%	Styria
3.	**Celje**	38,175	37,520	▲1.73%	Styria
4.	**Kranj**	38,089	36,874	▲3.24%	Upper Carniola
5.	**Koper**	26,579	24,996	▲6.14%	Slovene Littoral
6.	**Velenje**	25,617	25,456	▲0.63%	Styria
7.	**Novo Mesto**	24,741	23,341	▲5.82%	Lower Carniola
8.	**Ptuj**	18,247	18,164	▲0.46%	Styria
9.	Kamnik	13,745	13,644	▲0.74%	Upper Carniola
10.	Jesenice	13,740	13,440	▲2.21%	Upper Carniola
11.	Trbovlje	13,665	15,163	▼ –10.39%	Styria
12.	Domžale	13,326	12,406	▲7.15%	Upper Carniola
13.	**Nova Gorica**	12,950	13,178	▼ –1.75%	Slovene Littoral
14.	Škofja Loka	11,743	11,969	▼ –1.91%	Upper Carniola
15.	Izola	11,424	11,223	▲1.78%	Slovene Littoral
16.	**Murska Sobota**	10,859	11,614	▼ –6.72%	Prekmurje
17.	Logatec	10,107	8,942	▲12.23%	Inner Carniola
18.	Postojna	10,043	9,183	▲8.95%	Inner Carniola
19.	Vrhnika	9,178	8,413	▲8.7%	Inner Carniola
20.	Slovenska Bistrica	8,435	7,454	▲12.35%	Styria
21.	Kočevje	8,008	8,672	▼ –7.96%	Lower Carniola
22.	Grosuplje	7,866	7,098	▲10.26%	Lower Carniola
23.	**Slovenj Gradec**	7,746	7,519	▲2.97%	Styria
24.	Mengeš	7,336	6,112	▲18.2%	Upper Carniola
25.	Ajdovščina	7,247	6,656	▲8.5%	Slovene Littoral
26.	Ravne na Koroškem	7,157	6,979	▲2.52%	Carinthia
27.	**Krško**	6,934	7,097	▼ –2.32%	Lower Carniola
27.	Brežice	6,934	6,573	▲5.35%	Styria
29.	Litija	6,732	6,467	▲4.02%	Upper Carniola
30.	Sežana	6,173	5,531	▲10.97%	Slovene Littoral
31.	Radovljica	6,077	5,940	▲2.28%	Upper Carniola
32.	Zagorje ob Savi	5,995	6,439	▼ –7.03%	Upper Carniola
33.	Idrija	5,701	5,955	▼ –4.36%	Slovene Littoral
34.	Medvode	5,451	5,178	▲5.14%	Upper Carniola
35.	Črnomelj	5,432	5,776	▼ –6.14%	Lower Carniola
36.	Rogaška Slatina	5,256	5,111	▲2.8%	Styria
37.	Slovenske Konjice	5,242	4,869	▲7.38%	Styria
38.	Bled	5,155	5,181	▼ –0.5%	Upper Carniola
39.	Šentjur	5,107	4,762	▲6.99%	Styria
40.	Žalec	5,096	4,943	▲3.05%	Styria
41.	Hrastnik	4,667	5,621	▼ –18.55%	Styria
42.	Sevnica	4,555	4,660	▼ –2.28%	Styria
43.	Prevalje	4,550	4,643	▼ –2.02%	Carinthia
44.	Ilirska Bistrica	4,291	4,553	▼ –5.29%	Inner Carniola
45.	Ruše	4,199	4,503	▼ –6.99%	Styria
46.	Cerknica	4,124	3,928	▲4.87%	Inner Carniola
47.	Trebnje	3,901	3,477	▲11.49%	Lower Carniola
48.	Žiri	3,820	3,588	▲6.26%	Upper Carniola
49.	Ribnica	3,780	3,604	▲4.77%	Lower Carniola
50.	Tržič	3,772	3,865	▼ –2.44%	Upper Carniola
51.	Šempeter pri Gorici	3,685	3,760	▼ –2.01%	Slovene Littoral
52.	Piran	3,678	4,192	▼ –13.06%	Slovene Littoral
53.	Lenart v Slovenskih Goricah	3,568	3,006	▲17.1%	Styria
54.	Laško	3,340	3,456	▼ –3.41%	Styria
55.	Metlika	3,246	3,273	▼ –0.83%	Lower Carniola
56.	Ljutomer	3,219	3,460	▼ –7.22%	Styria
57.	Gornja Radgona	3,179	3,159	▲0.63%	Styria
58.	Dravograd	3,120	3,289	▼ –5.27%	Carinthia
59.	Mežica	3,093	3,254	▼ –5.07%	Carinthia
60.	Zreče	3,087	2,935	▲5.05%	Styria
61.	Tolmin	3,086	3,534	▼ –13.53%	Slovene Littoral
62.	Šoštanj	3,078	2,880	▲6.65%	Styria
63.	Železniki	2,856	3,075	▼ –7.38%	Upper Carniola
64.	Lendava	2,826	3,129	▼ –10.18%	Prekmurje
65.	Ormož	1,956	2,174	▼ –10.56%	Styria
66.	Radeče	1,914	2,168	▼ –12.45%	Lower Carniola
67.	Bovec	1,520	1,631	▼ –7.05%	Slovene Littoral
68.	Višnja Gora	1,182	1,000	▲16.68%	Lower Carniola
69.	Kostanjevica na Krki	703	695	▲1.15%	Lower Carniola
