= Bohinjska Bistrica =

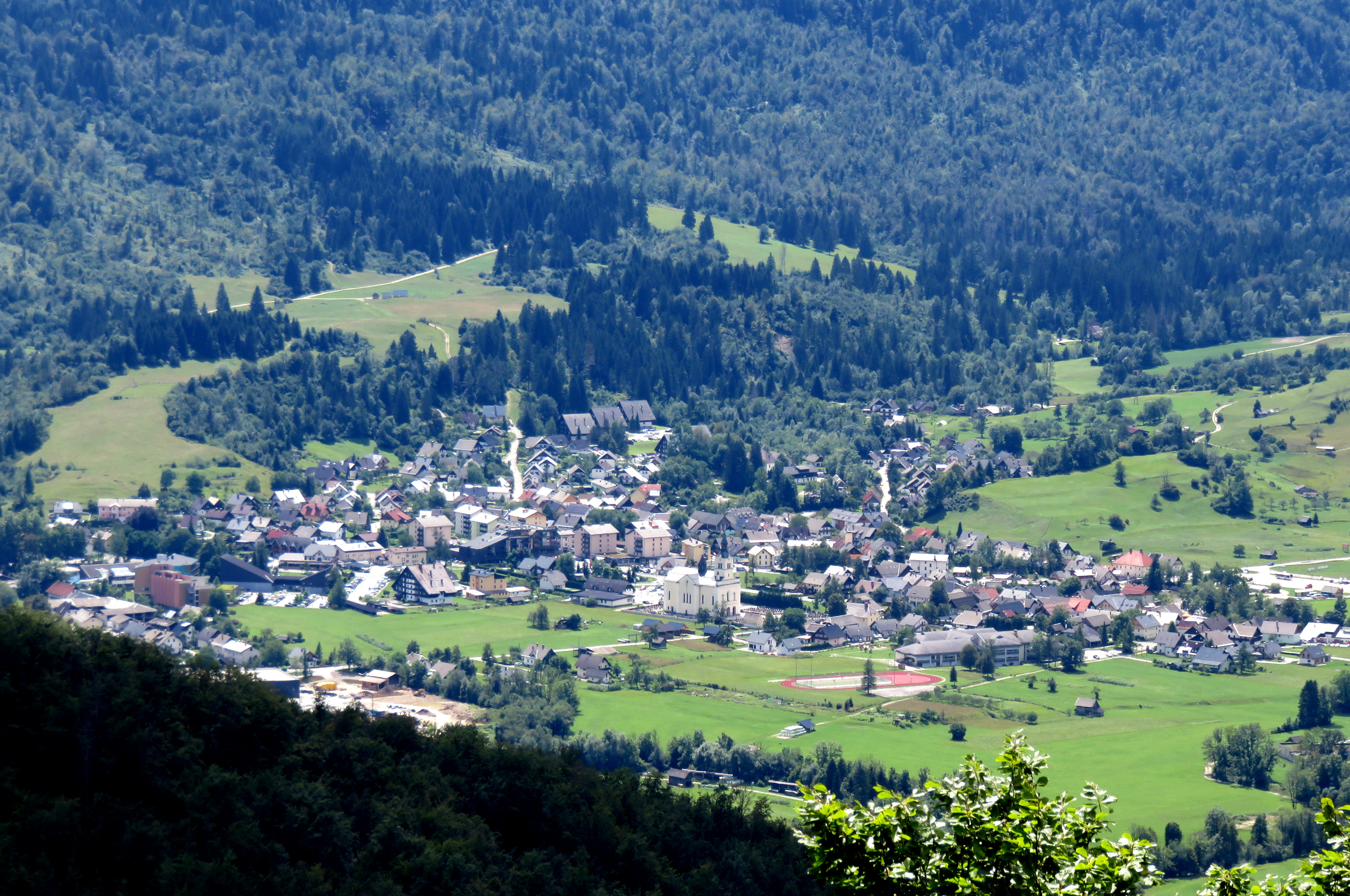

- Location in Slovenia
- Coordinates: 46°16′27.22″N 13°57′8.64″E
- Country: Slovenia
- Traditional region: Upper Carniola
- Statistical region: Upper Carniola
- Municipality: Bohinj

Government
  - Mayor: Jože Sodja (Independent)
- Elevation: 509 m (1,670 ft)

Population (2020)
  - Total: 1,767
- Website: bohinj.si

Bohinjska Bistrica (pronounced [bɔˈxiːnska ˈbiːstɾitsa]; German: Wocheiner Feistritz) is the largest settlement and administrative centre of the Municipality of Bohinj, in the Upper Carniola region of northwestern Slovenia.

== Geography ==
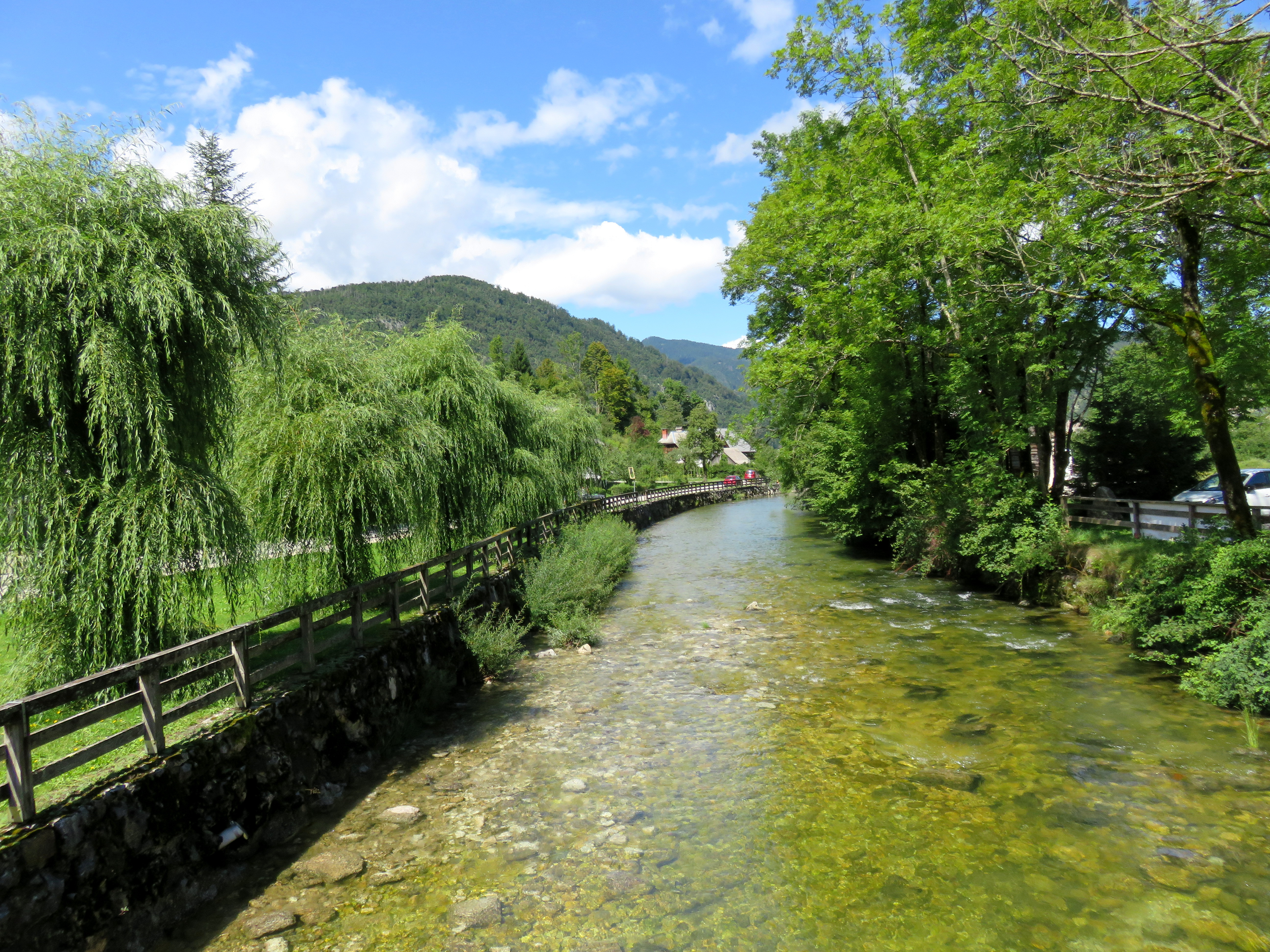
The Bistrica River in Bohinjska Bistrica

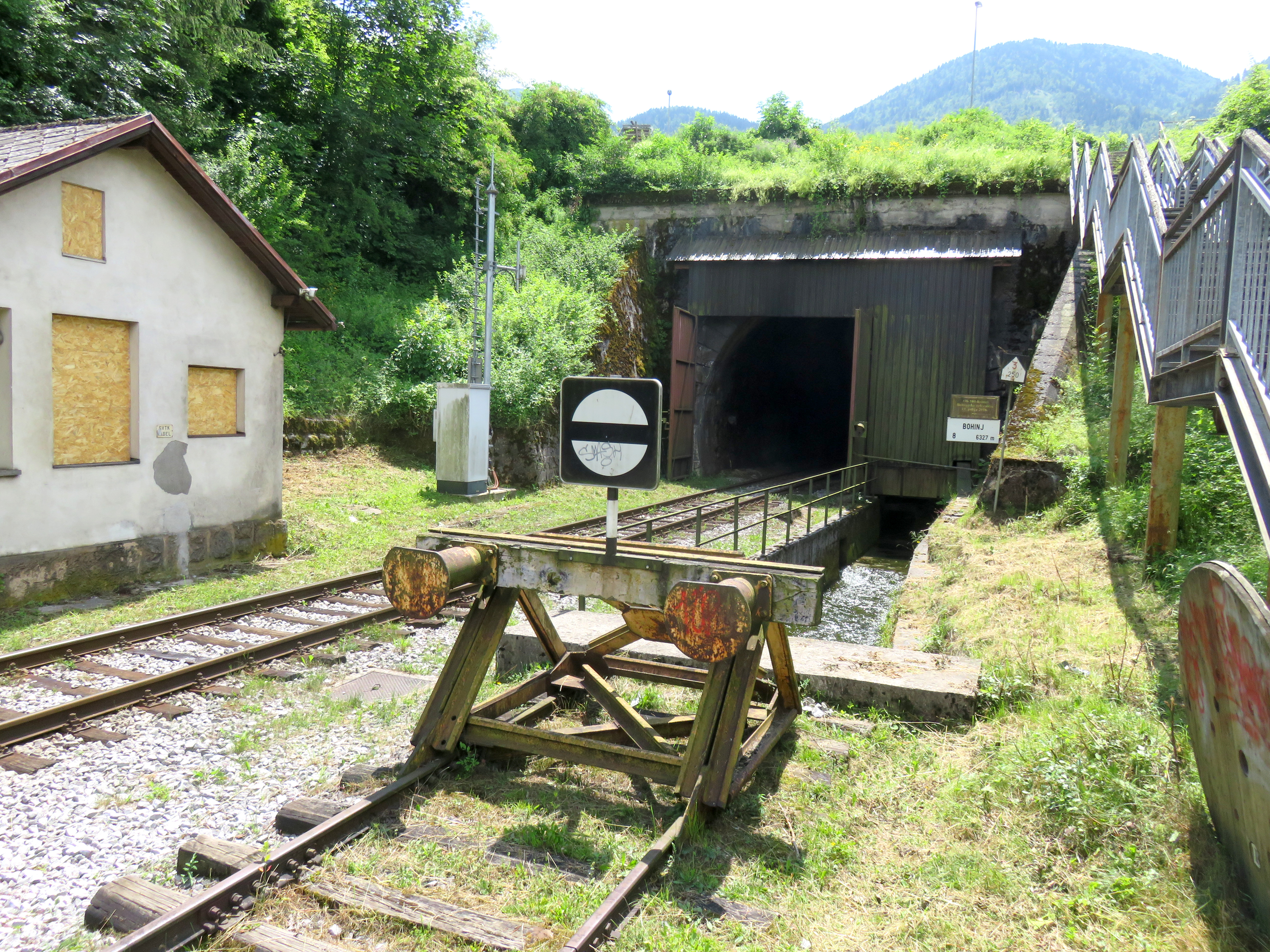
Northern portal of the Bohinj Tunnel

The settlement lies in the Julian Alps southwest of the Triglav massif and the Pokljuka Plateau, in the Sava Bohinjka Valley between the Dobrava and Ajdovski Gradec hills and Bistrica and Belica creeks. Lake Bohinj forms the head of the valley in the west.

Bohinjska Bistrica railway station is a stop on the Bohinj Railway line from Jesenice to Trieste via the 6,327 m (20,758 ft) Bohinj Tunnel. The main road leading to the railway station divides the settlement into the upper and lower hamlets of Zgornja Vas (Slovene: Zgornja vas) and Spodnja Vas (Spodnja vas).

=== Climate ===
Climate data for Zoisova ulica, Bohinjska Bistrica (507m elev.) [1948-2022]
| Month | Jan | Feb | Mar | Apr | May | Jun | Jul | Aug | Sep | Oct | Nov | Dec | Year |
|---|---|---|---|---|---|---|---|---|---|---|---|---|---|
| Average precipitation mm (inches) | 131.96 (5.20) | 127.58 (5.02) | 133.35 (5.25) | 159.17 (6.27) | 162.1 (6.38) | 174.31 (6.86) | 161.66 (6.36) | 166.16 (6.54) | 197.97 (7.79) | 225.93 (8.89) | 282.39 (11.12) | 181.2 (7.13) | 2,103.78 (82.81) |
| Average extreme snow depth cm (inches) | 40.6 (16.0) | 49.47 (19.48) | 38.03 (14.97) | 11.39 (4.48) | 2.6 (1.0) | trace | trace | 0.0 (0.0) | 0.0 (0.0) | 6.21 (2.44) | 16.54 (6.51) | 30.9 (12.2) | 49.47 (19.48) |
| Average precipitation days (≥ 0.1 mm) | 8.22 | 8.11 | 8.48 | 11.61 | 13.6 | 13.36 | 12.51 | 11.49 | 10.19 | 10.41 | 11.18 | 8.89 | 128.05 |
| Average rainy days (≥ 0.1 mm) | 4.82 | 5.12 | 7.0 | 11.33 | 13.56 | 13.35 | 12.51 | 11.41 | 10.04 | 10.34 | 10.09 | 6.58 | 116.15 |
| Average snowy days (≥ 0.1 mm) | 4.51 | 4.24 | 2.67 | 1.17 | 0.24 | 0.01 | 0.0 | 0.0 | 0.0 | 0.3 | 2.0 | 3.77 | 18.91 |
Source: National Meteorological Service of Slovenia – Archive

== Name ==
Bohinjska Bistrica was attested in written sources as Vustris in 1253, Feustricz in 1368, and Freuͤstriez in 1464, among other spellings. The name literally means 'Bistrica in the Bohinj region', similar to Ilirska Bistrica (i.e., 'Illyrian Bistrica') or Kamniška Bistrica (i.e., 'Bistrica in the Kamnik area'). Bistrica (and its cognates) is a very common Slavic place name; it is a hydronym that was later applied to settlements associated with rivers, creeks, or springs. It is derived from Proto-Slavic *bystrica 'quick-flowing river', in turn from *bystrъ 'quick-flowing, rushing'.

== Museum ==
The Tomaž Godec Museum, part of the Upper Carniola Museum (Slovene: Gorenjski muzej), is located in the town in the building of the old Godec family tannery, next to the creek. Part of the museum features an exhibition about the tanning process. Upstairs, documents and artifacts from World War I are on display, focusing on the Battles of the Isonzo from 1915 to 1917, which took place in the mountains around the nearby Soča Valley. In addition, information and a video about the "Iron Route" are shown, explaining some of the history of iron mining and production across the Alps.

== Archaeological sites ==
Bohinjska Bistrica is the location of three archaeological sites.

- The Giant's Castle archaeological site (Arheološko najdišče Ajdovski gradec) is a 5th-century BC fortification east of the settlement. It served as a refuge in the late Roman era, and features terracing, the remains of a defensive wall, and a fortified gate. It is associated with two prehistoric burial sites.
- The Selo archaeological site near Giant's Castle (Arheološko območje Selo pri Ajdovskem gradcu) is a late Iron Age and Roman era site. The terraced slope shows traces of building layouts and various artifacts have been found at the site.
- The Telečnica archaeological site (Arheološko območje Telečnica) was inhabited in prehistoric times. It features artificial terracing and various finds have been discovered at the site.

== Recreation ==
Bohinjska Bistrica is an important tourist destination on the edge of Triglav National Park, and it is a good starting point for exploring the Bohinj Valley and for trips to Črna Prst, Vogel, Komna, Ratitovec, and Lake Bohinj. In spring the meadows have many wildflowers, and a Spring Flower Festival with guided walks is held. The Bohinj Valley is also popular for walking, climbing, and mountain biking from spring to autumn. In summer the river and nearby lake are popular for swimming, sailing, kayaking, rafting, and fishing. A free parking area is available close to the Danica Campsite, and on weekends and holidays a free bus service runs every half hour to the lake. There is also a bicycle route that runs through the meadows from the park and ride to Lake Bohinj (approximately 35 minutes). The summer season closes in September with a "Cow Ball" (with decorated cows), which is held near the lake. For winter recreation, there are two ski centres close by, the Vogel Ski Resort and Soriška Planina Ski Resort, which are connected to Bohinjska Bistrica by a ski bus. The bus also connects to the Pokljuka Cross-Country Ski Area. The town is served by the Bohinjska Bistrica railway station, with direct trains several times a day to Jesenice and Nova Gorica. In winter months, the ski bus runs from the railway station to Vogel. A regular public bus service runs to the lake and to Bled and Ljubljana. The nearest airport is Ljubljana; there is no direct connection to the airport by public transport, but a shuttle bus service is available to the Bled bus station, or for an additional fee, to Bohinj. Bohinj can also be accessed by rail and bus from the Italian airports in Venice and Trieste. There is a railway station connecting with Jesenice and Nova Gorica.

== Notable people ==
Notable people that were born or lived in Bohinjska Bistrica include:

- France Bučar (1923–2015), politician and author
- Janez Remic (1921–1945), poet and literary critic

== Gallery ==
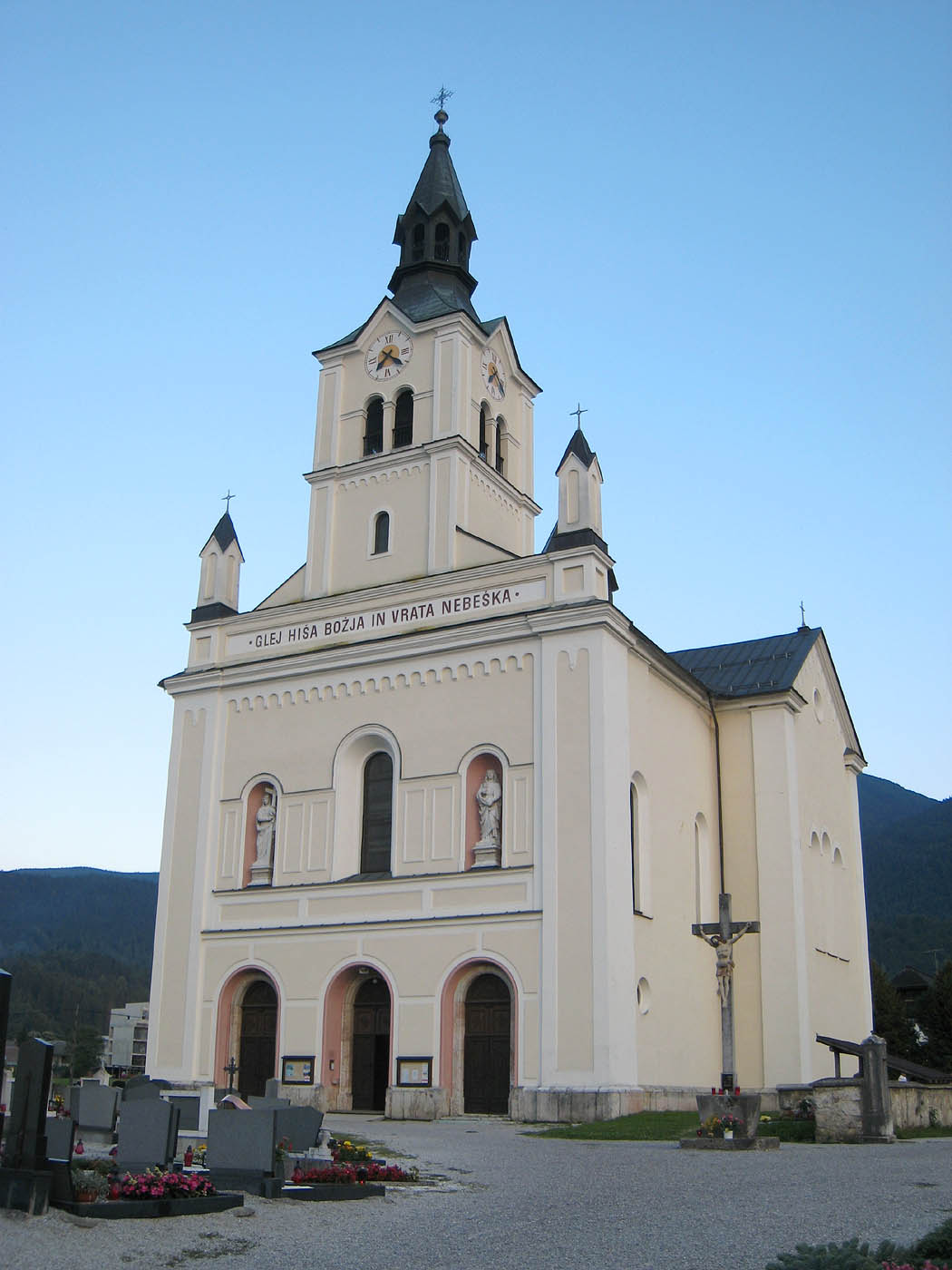
St. Nicholas's Church

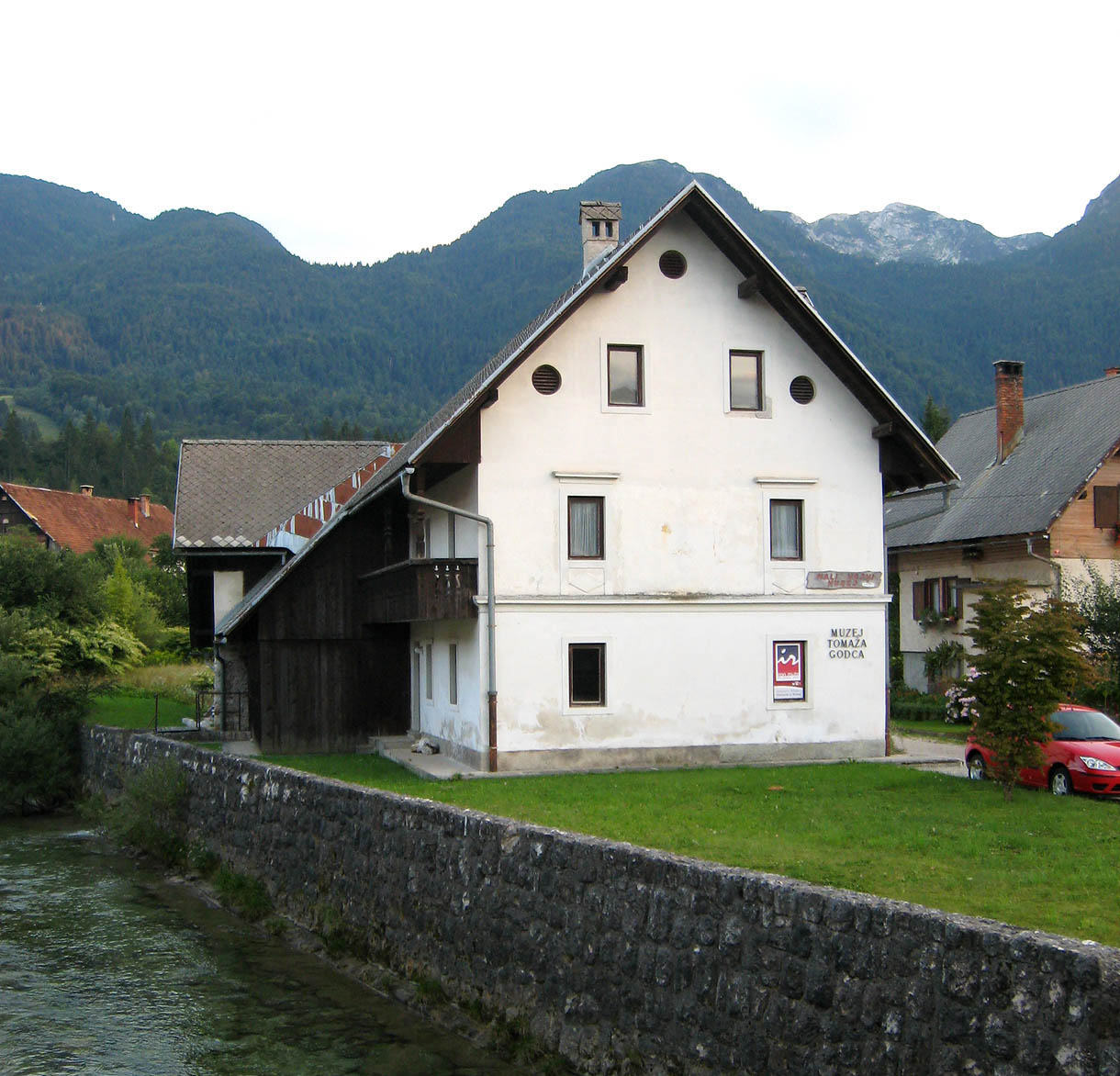
The Tomaž Godec Museum
