= Suhadole, Komenda =

Suhadole
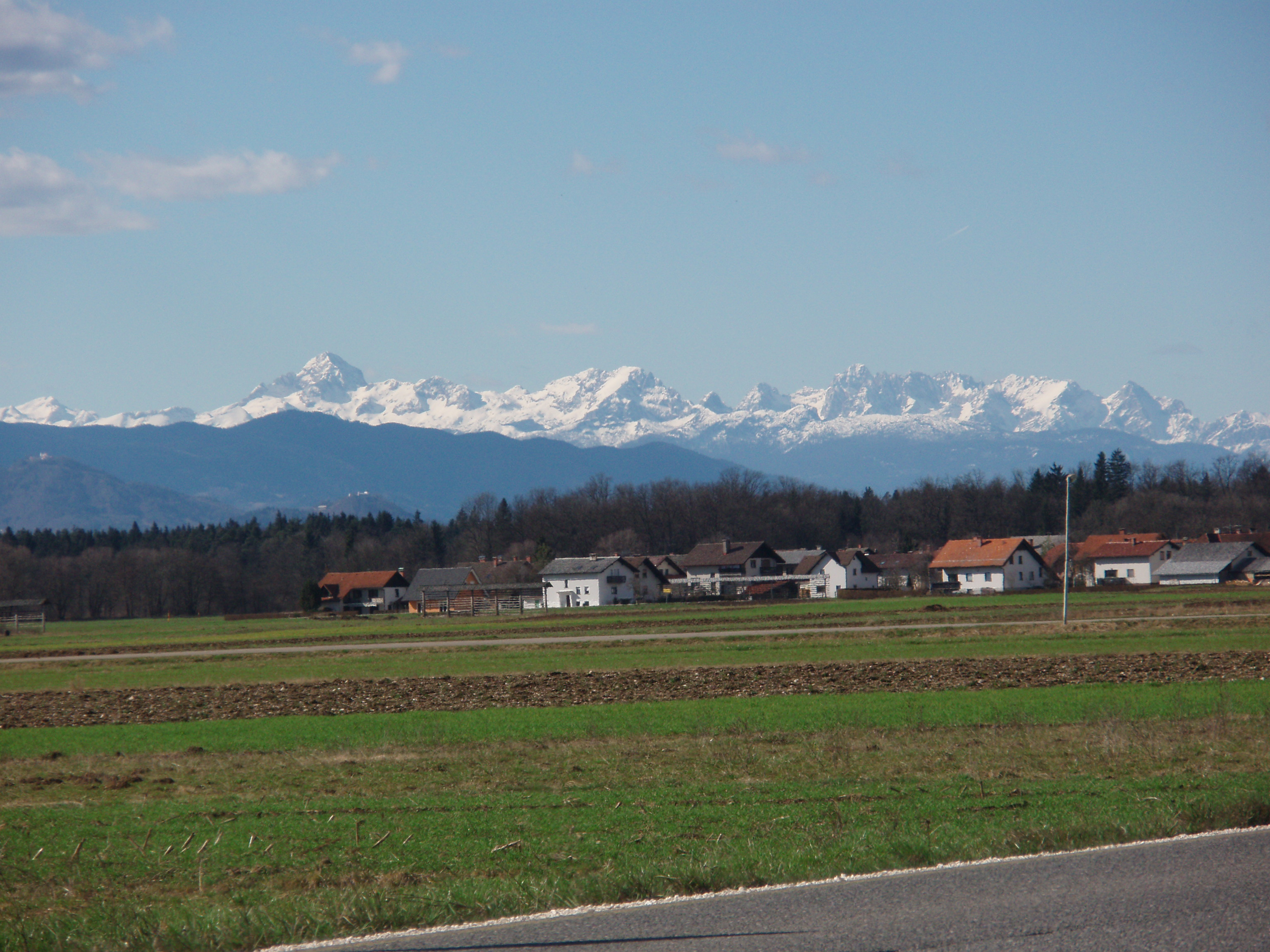

- Location in Slovenia
- Coordinates: 46°11′7.62″N 14°32′53.38″E
- Country: Slovenia
- Traditional region: Upper Carniola
- Statistical region: Central Slovenia
- Municipality: Komenda

Area
  - Total: 4.2 km^{2} (1.6 sq mi)
- Elevation: 327.1 m (1,073 ft)

Population (2019)
  - Total: 867

Suhadole (pronounced [suxaˈdoːlɛ]; German: Suchadole) is a settlement in the Municipality of Komenda in the Upper Carniola region of Slovenia.

== Church ==
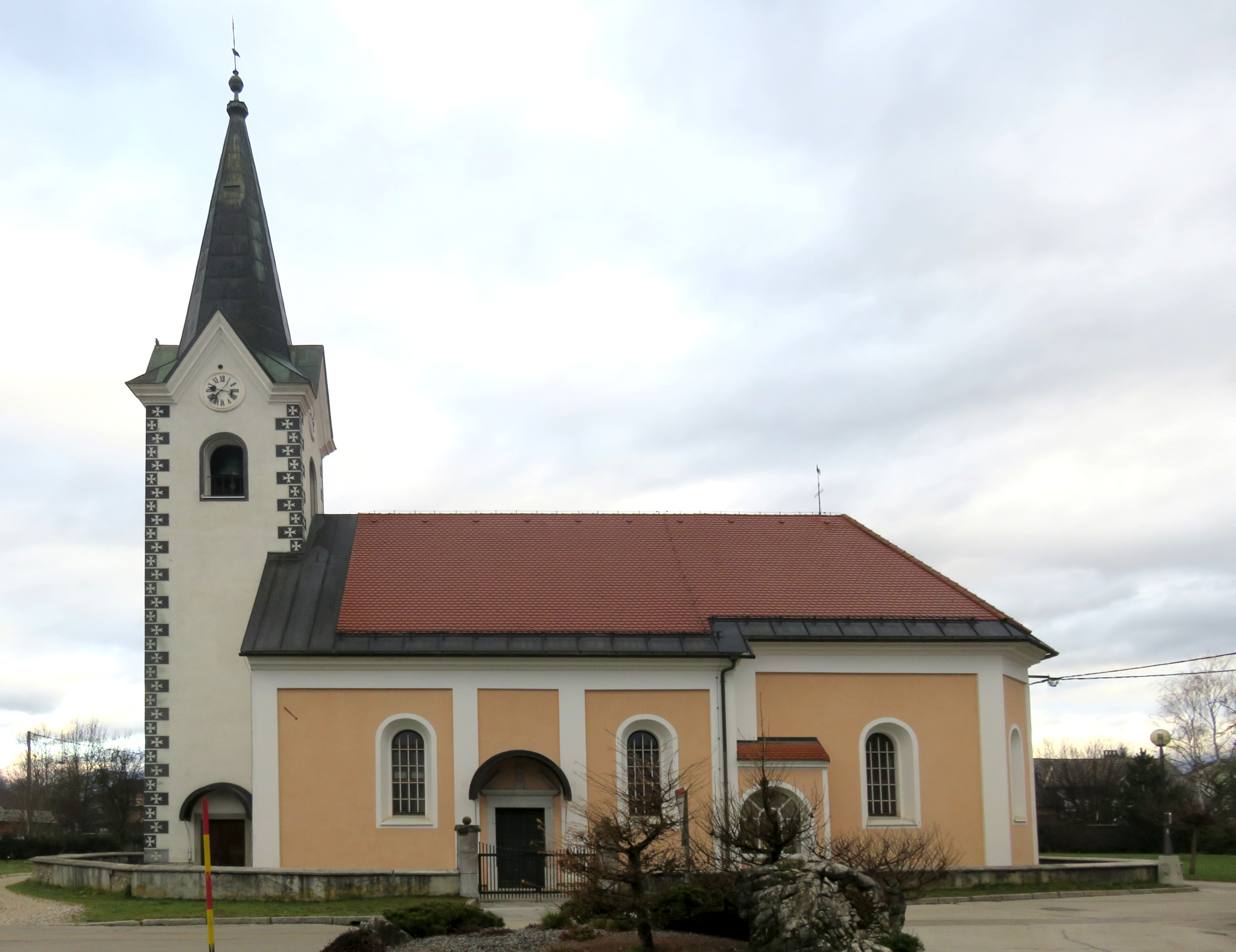
Saint Clement's Church

The local church is dedicated to Saint Clement. It was extensively renovated in 1999, during which remnants of an earlier church were discovered. These remains are now displayed in the church.

== Notable people ==
Notable people that were born or lived in Suhadole include the following:

- France Pibernik (1928–2021), poet, author, essayist, and literary historian
