= Grahovo, Cerknica =

Grahovo
- Village
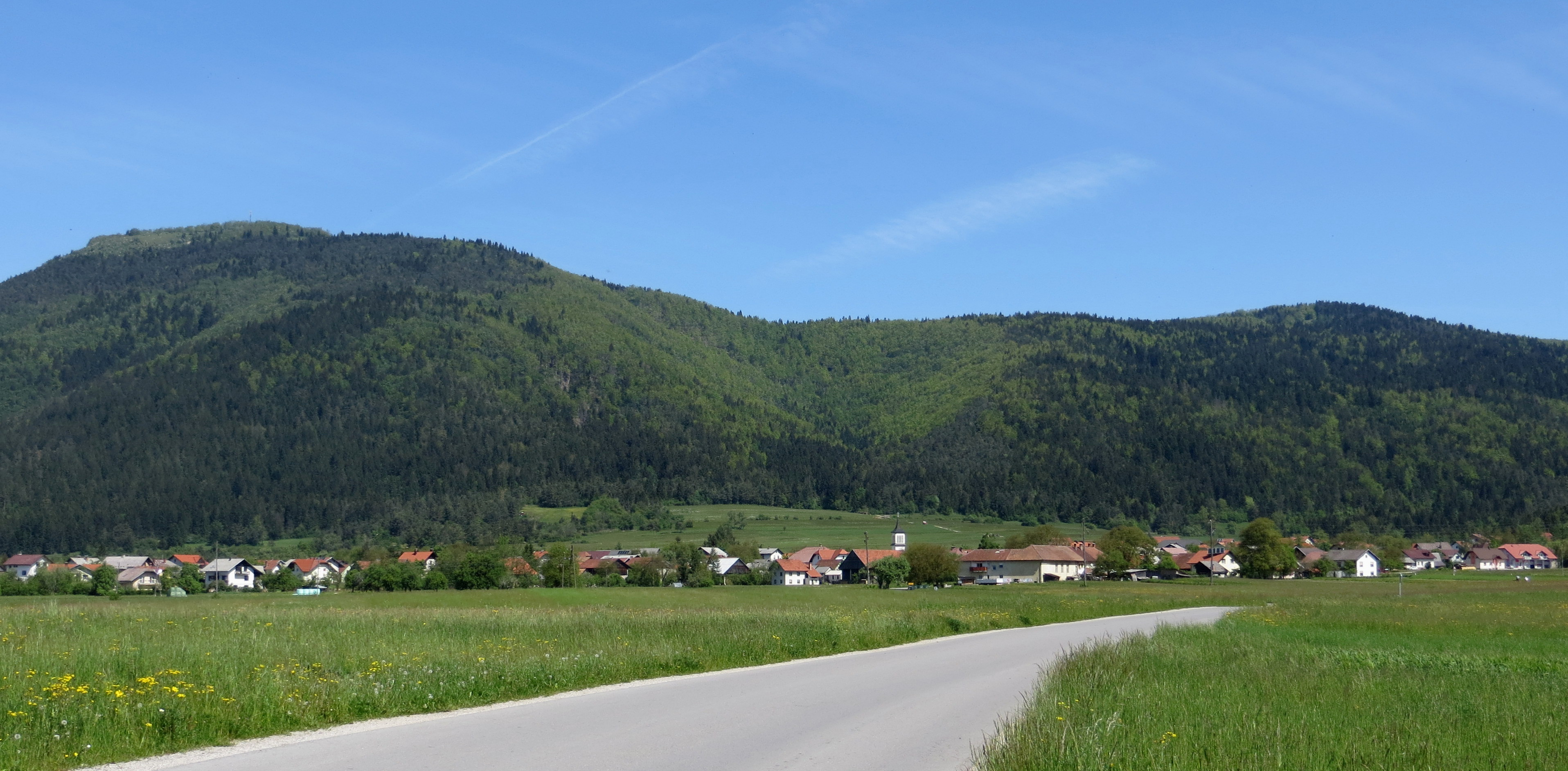

- Location in Slovenia
- Coordinates: 45°46′10.7″N 14°25′21.2″E
- Country: Slovenia
- Traditional region: Inner Carniola
- Statistical region: Littoral–Inner Carniola
- Municipality: Cerknica

Area
  - Total: 7.03 km^{2} (2.71 sq mi)
- Elevation: 569.6 m (1,869 ft)

Population (2020)
  - Total: 508
  - Density: 72.3/km^{2} (187/sq mi)

Grahovo (pronounced [ɡɾaˈxɔːʋɔ] or [ɡɾaˈxoːʋɔ], German: Grachowo) is a village on the eastern shores of Lake Cerknica in the Municipality of Cerknica in the Inner Carniola region of Slovenia.

== Name ==
Grahovo was attested in written sources in 1355 and 1499 as Grochaw (and as Grocha in 1438 and 1487, and Grathaw in 1448). The name is probably derived from the personal name Grah, which is still preserved as a surname in Slovenia and is probably borrowed from the Old High German name Gracco. The place name would thus mean 'Grah's (village)'. Another possible derivation is from the common noun *grahovišče 'pea field' via the contracted form *grahovše. Direct derivation from the Slovene common noun grah 'pea' is unlikely because of the rarity of such names and the suffixation pattern. The name Grahova vas is also occasionally found in some dated sources.

== Memorials ==
In 1990, a memorial to poet France Balantič was erected in front of the local school.

In 2014, another memorial was erected to 32 Slovene Home Guard members that were killed in the 1943 attack by the Slovene Partisans. The choice to erect it on anniversary date of the 1941 Axis invasion of Yugoslavia was met with criticism by the Slovene Partisan veterans association, Primorski Puntarji, and some left-wing political parties, which accused right-wing political leaders of trying to rehabilitate collaborationism. In addition to the left-wing veterans associations, a petition against the second monument was also signed by the TIGR veterans association. The monument was vandalized on April 16, 2014 and again on April 11, 2020.

== Church ==
The Grahovo parish church, built southeast of the settlement in 1992, is dedicated to the Immaculate Conception and belongs to the Ljubljana Archdiocese. The original church dating to 1671 was burned down during the Partisan attack on 24 November 1943. The people of the village were not permitted to remove the ruins until 1960, and permission was not granted to build a new church until after Slovenian independence in 1991.

== Gallery ==
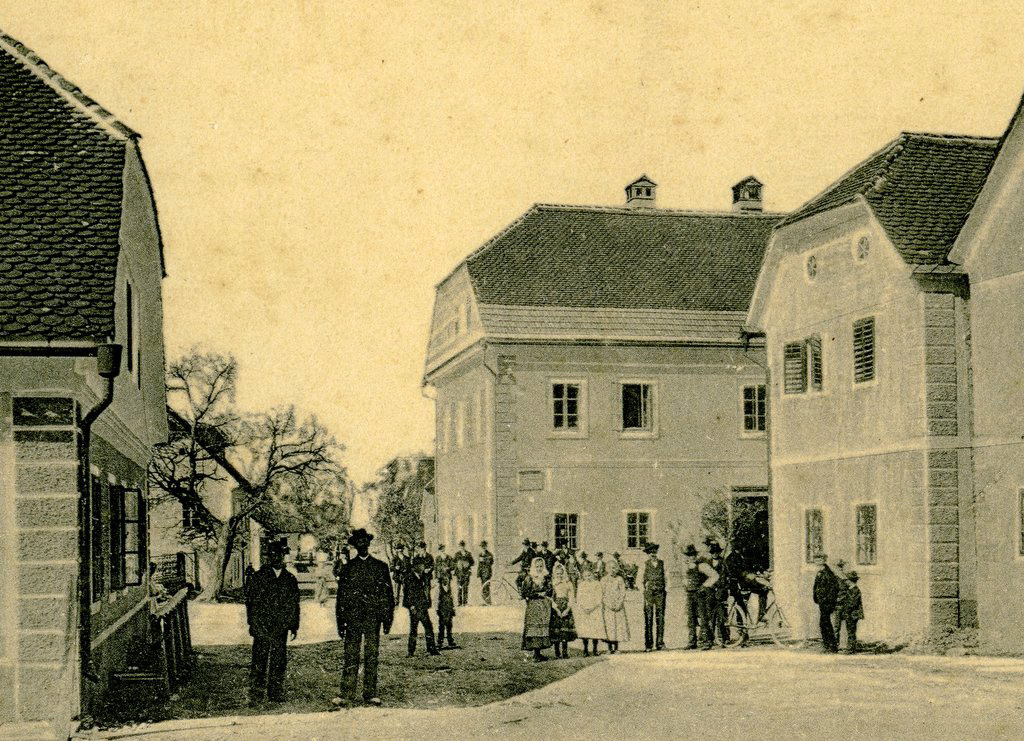
1919 postcard of Grahovo
