= Bohinjska Bistrica railway station =

Railway station in Slovenia

Bohinjska Bistrica
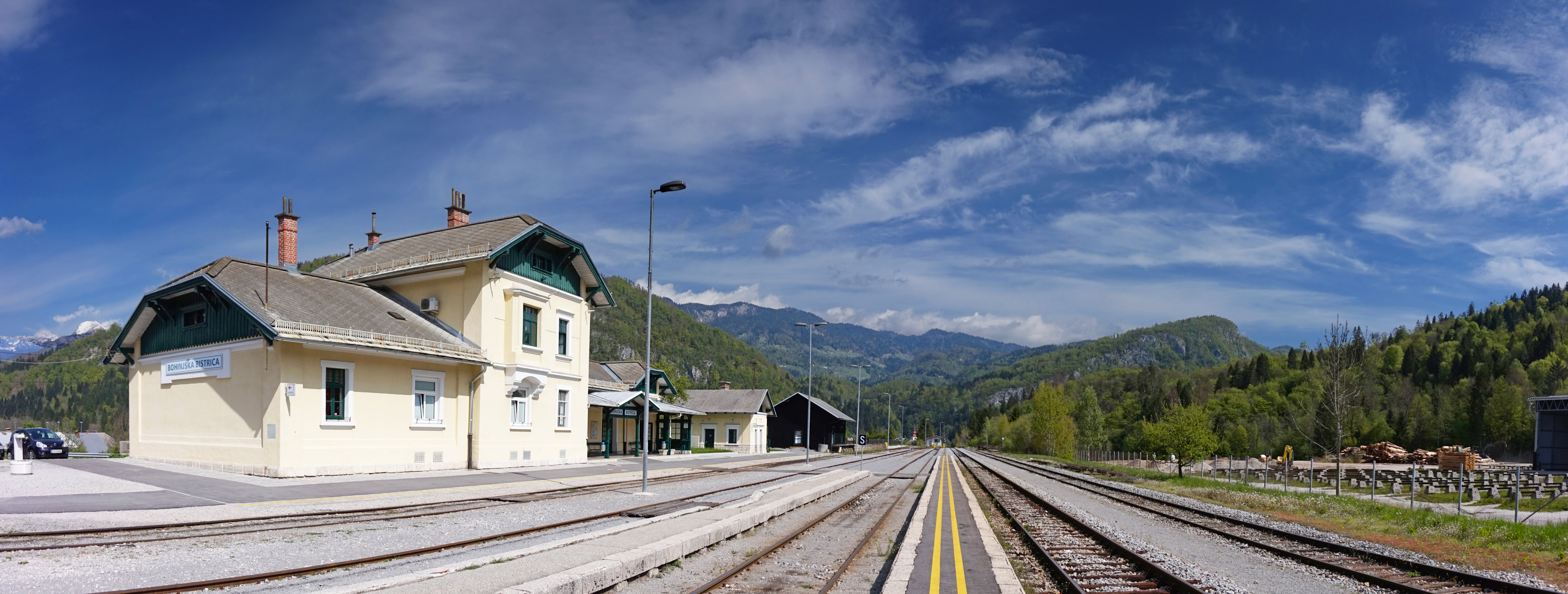

General information
- Location: 4264 Bohinjska Bistrica; Slovenia
- Coordinates: 46°16′27″N 13°57′32″E
- Owner: Slovenian Railways
- Operator: Slovenian Railways
Location
- Location within Slovenia

Bohinjska Bistrica railway station (Slovene: Železniška postaja Bohinjska Bistrica) is the principal railway station in Bohinjska Bistrica, Slovenia.
