= Radovljica =

- Town
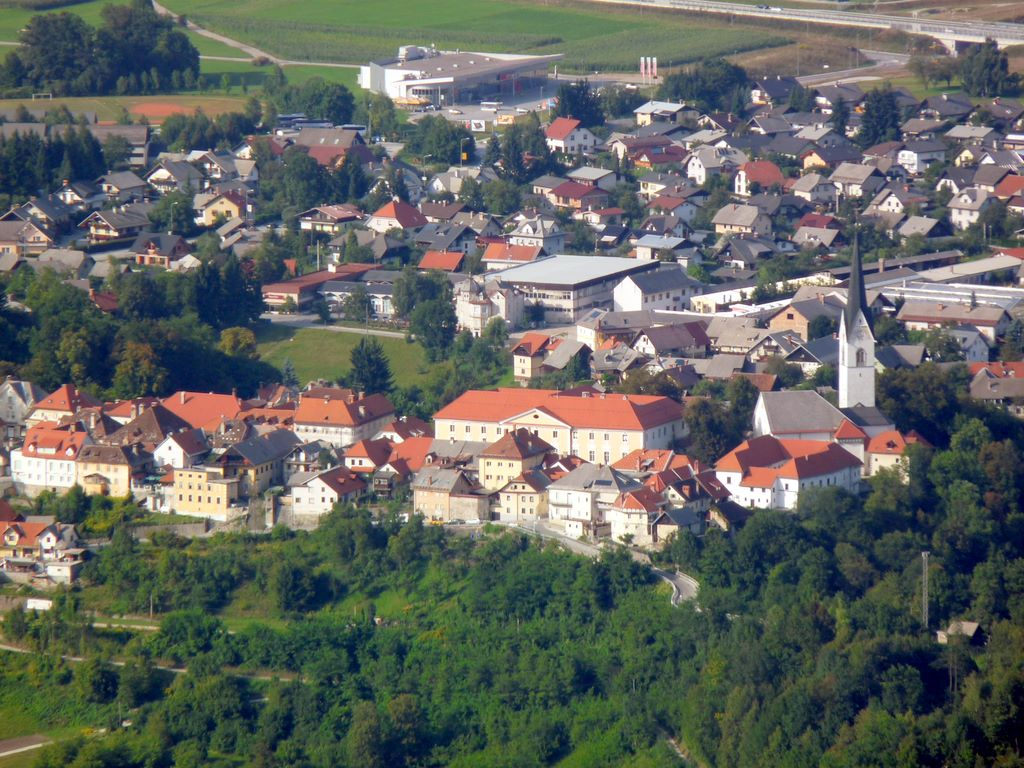
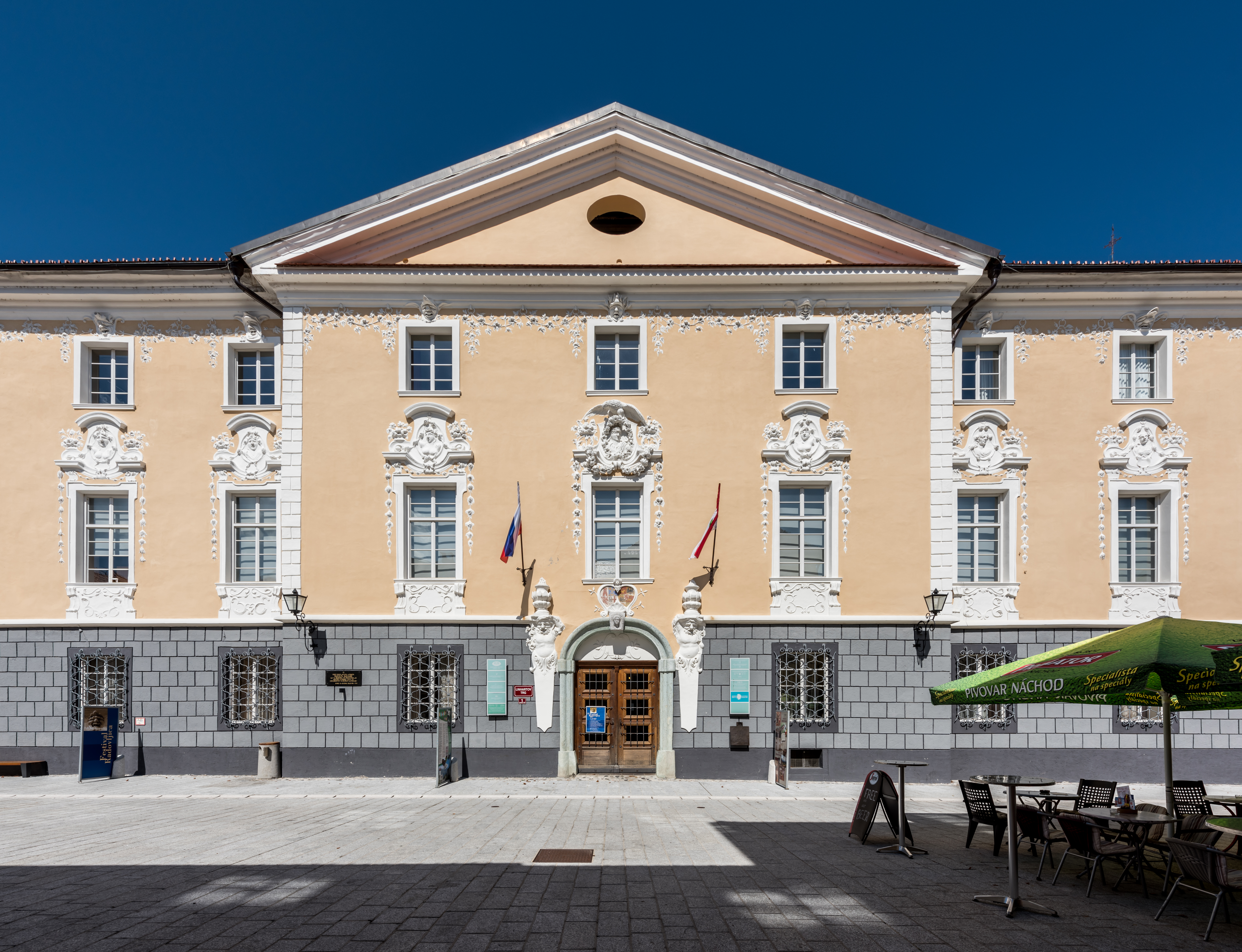
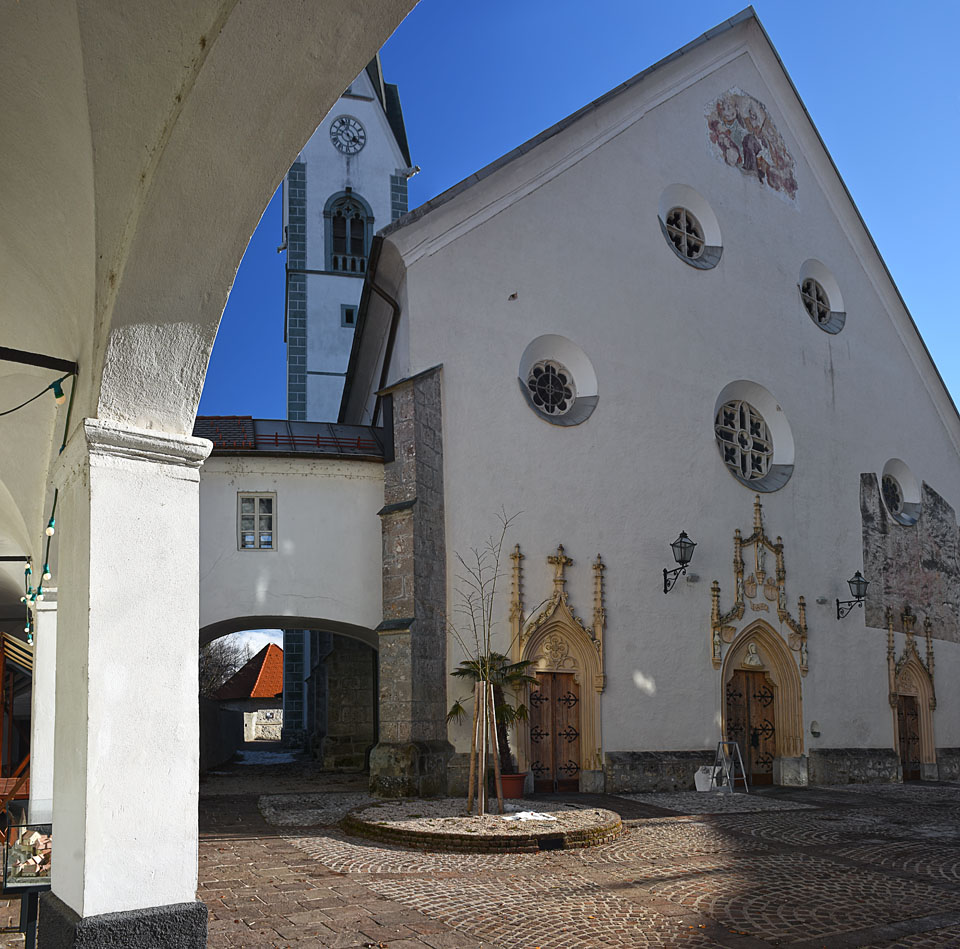
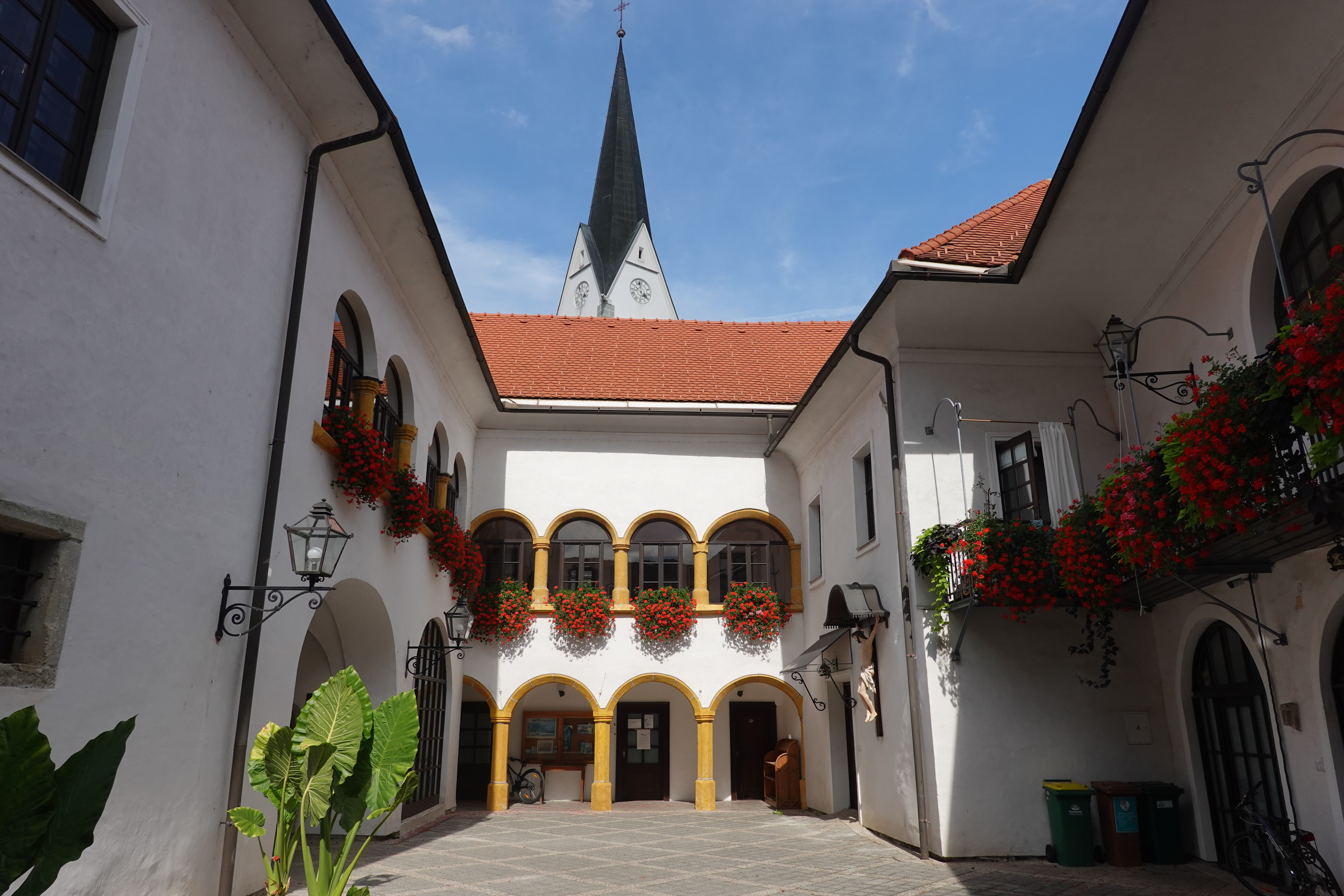
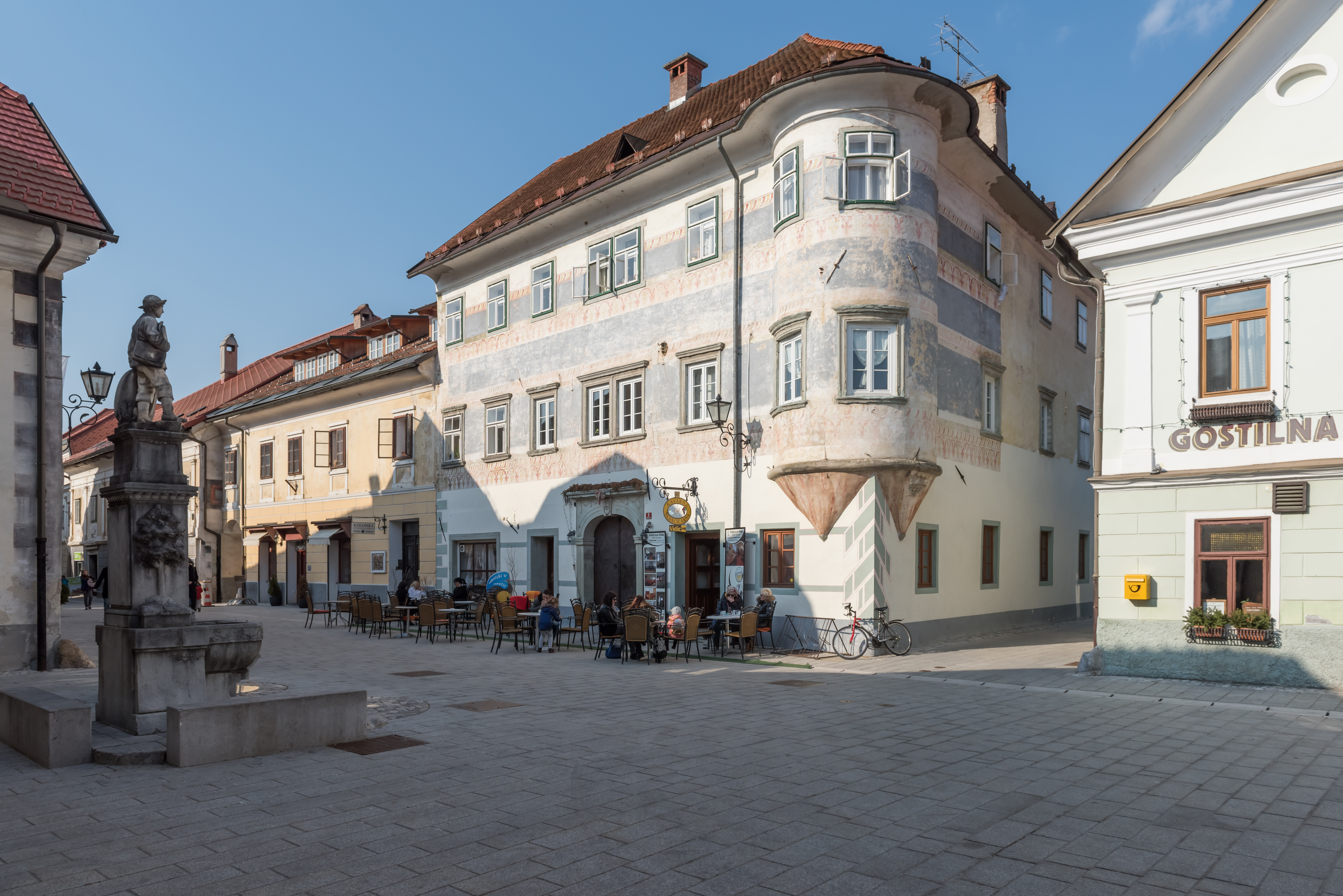
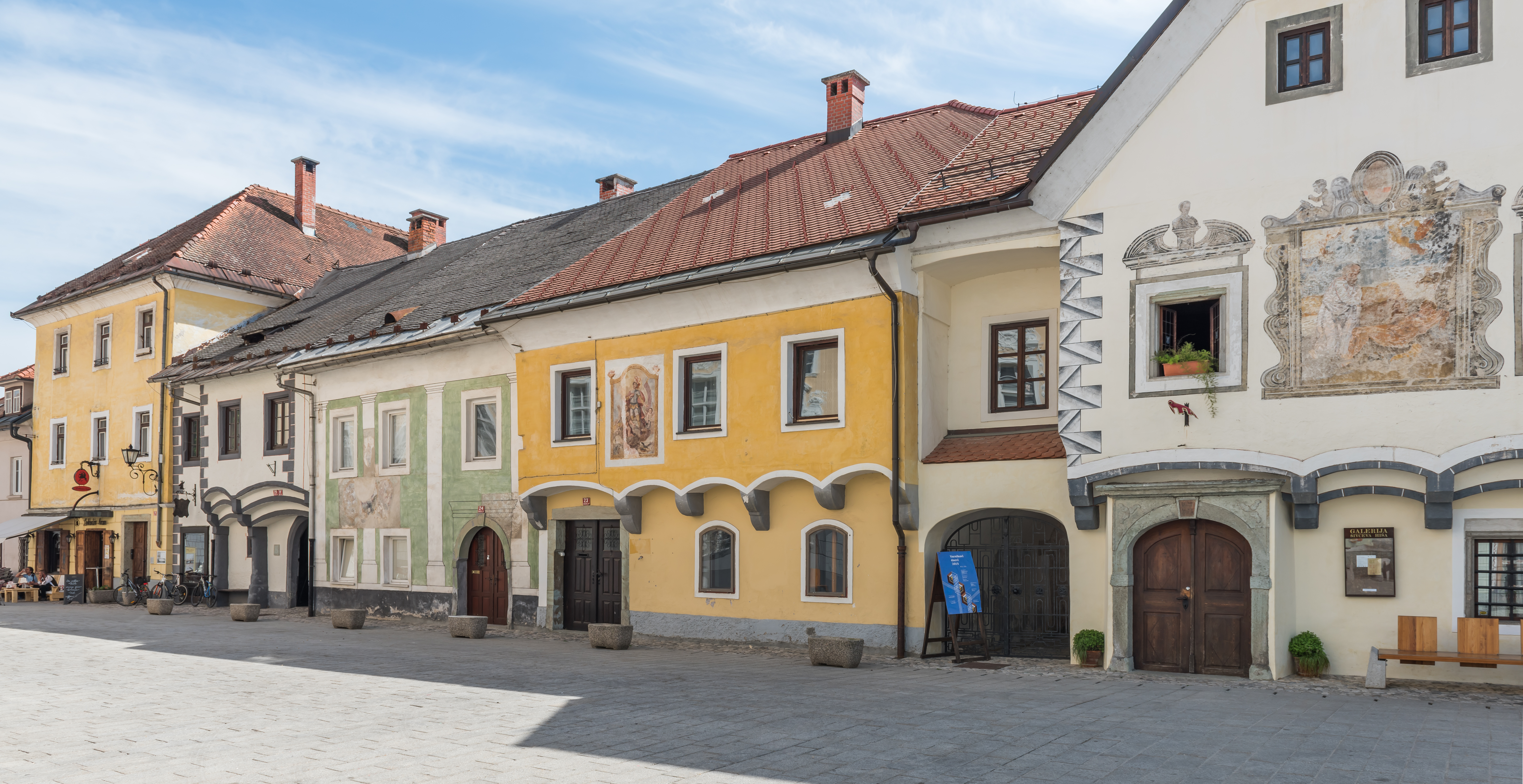
- From top, left to right: Aerial view of Radovljica, Thurn Castle, St. Peter's Church, Rectory courtyard, Vidic Manor, Linhart Square houses

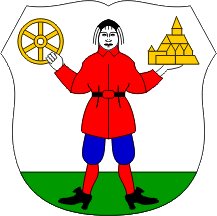
- Coat of arms

- Location in Slovenia
- Coordinates: 46°20′33.06″N 14°10′19.48″E
- Country: Slovenia
- Traditional region: Upper Carniola
- Statistical region: Upper Carniola
- Municipality: Radovljica

Area
  - Total: 4.9 km^{2} (1.9 sq mi)
- Elevation: 491.2 m (1,612 ft)

Population (2017)
  - Total: 5,981
- Vehicle registration: KR

Radovljica (pronounced [ɾaˈdɔ́ːwljitsa]; German: Radmannsdorf) is a town in the Upper Carniola region of northern Slovenia. It is the administrative seat of the Municipality of Radovljica.

== Geography ==
The town is located on the southern slope of the Karawanks mountain range, about 6 km (3.7 mi) of Lake Bled at the confluence of the Sava Dolinka and the Sava Bohinjka, both headwaters of the Sava River. It lies at the southern end of the Radovljica Plain (Slovene: Radovljiška ravnina, also known as Dežela). The Radovljica station is a stop on the Tarvisio–Ljubljana Railway line.

== Name ==
Radovljica was attested in historical sources as Radmansdorf in 1296, Ramansdorf and Rasmandorf in 1325, Rotmastof in 1349, and Rodmanßtorff in 1498, among other spellings. The name is derived from the nickname *Rado with two possessive suffixes plus a toponymic suffix (i.e., *Rad-ov-ľь-ica), thus originally meaning 'Rado's settlement'.

== History ==
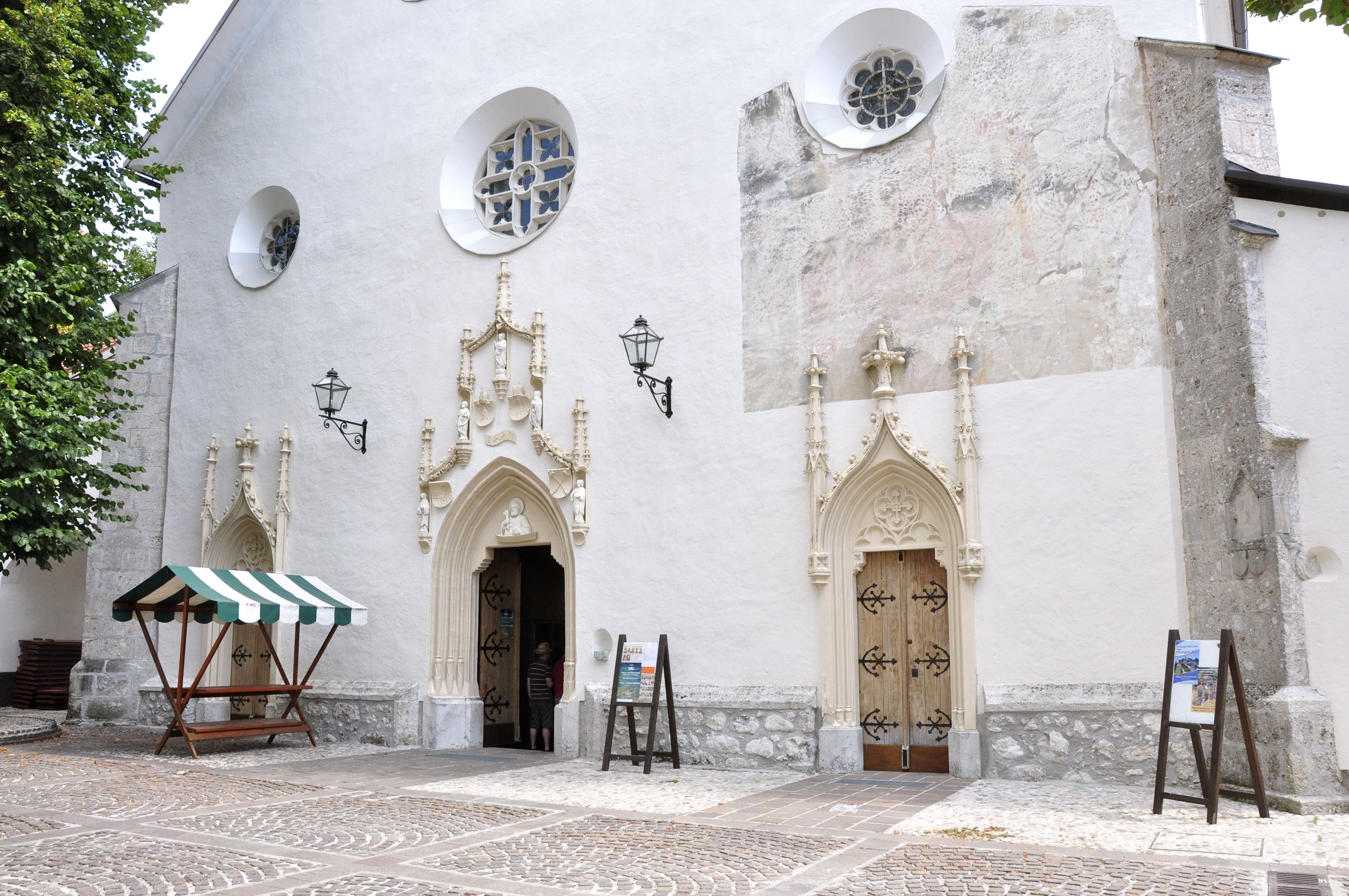
Portal of St Peter's Church

The settlement around a church built at the behest of the Patriarchs of Aquileia in the March of Carniola was first mentioned in a 1296 deed, it received market rights from Duke Henry of Carinthia in 1333. In the 14th century it was held by the Carinthian Counts of Ortenburg, was inherited by the Counts of Celje in 1418, and, upon the death of Count Ulrich II of Celje in 1456, fell to the Habsburg Emperor Frederick III.

With the Duchy of Carniola, Radovljica was incorporated into the Inner Austrian lands of the Habsburg monarchy and received city rights. From 1867 until 1918, the town's post office used the bilingual name Radmannsdorf – Radovljica. The town was in the Cisleithanian (Austrian) side of the Austro-Hungarian Empire after the Compromise of 1867 and the administrative capital of a district of the same name, one of the 11 Bezirkshauptmannschaften in the crown land of Carniola.

=== Concealed grave ===
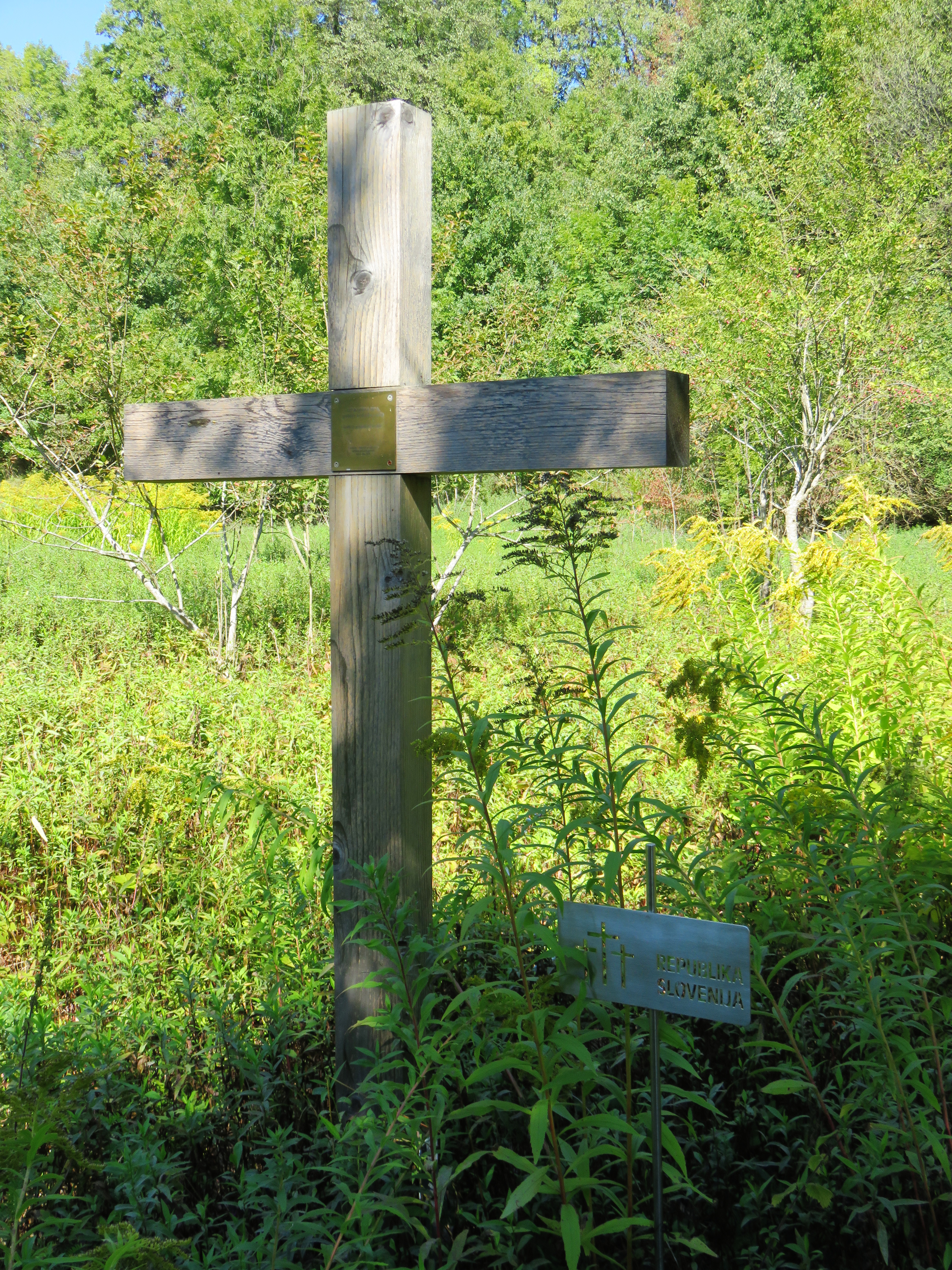
Andrejc Field Mass Grave

Radovljica is the site of a concealed grave associated with the Second World War. The Andrejc Field Mass Grave (Slovene: Grobišče Andrejčevo polje) is located in a meadow in the middle of a back-filled trench west of the settlement, between the road to Lesce and the railroad. It contains the remains of two unidentified prisoners from the former prison in Radovljica.

=== Population ===
Historical population
Year	1948	1953	1961	1971	1981	1991	2002	2011	2021
Pop.	2,154	2,266	2,687	3,683	5,498	6,132	5,937	5,940	6,133
±%	—	+5.2%	+18.6%	+37.1%	+49.3%	+11.5%	−3.2%	+0.1%	+3.2%
Population size may be affected by changes in administrative divisions.

== Sites of interest ==
=== Apiculture Museum ===
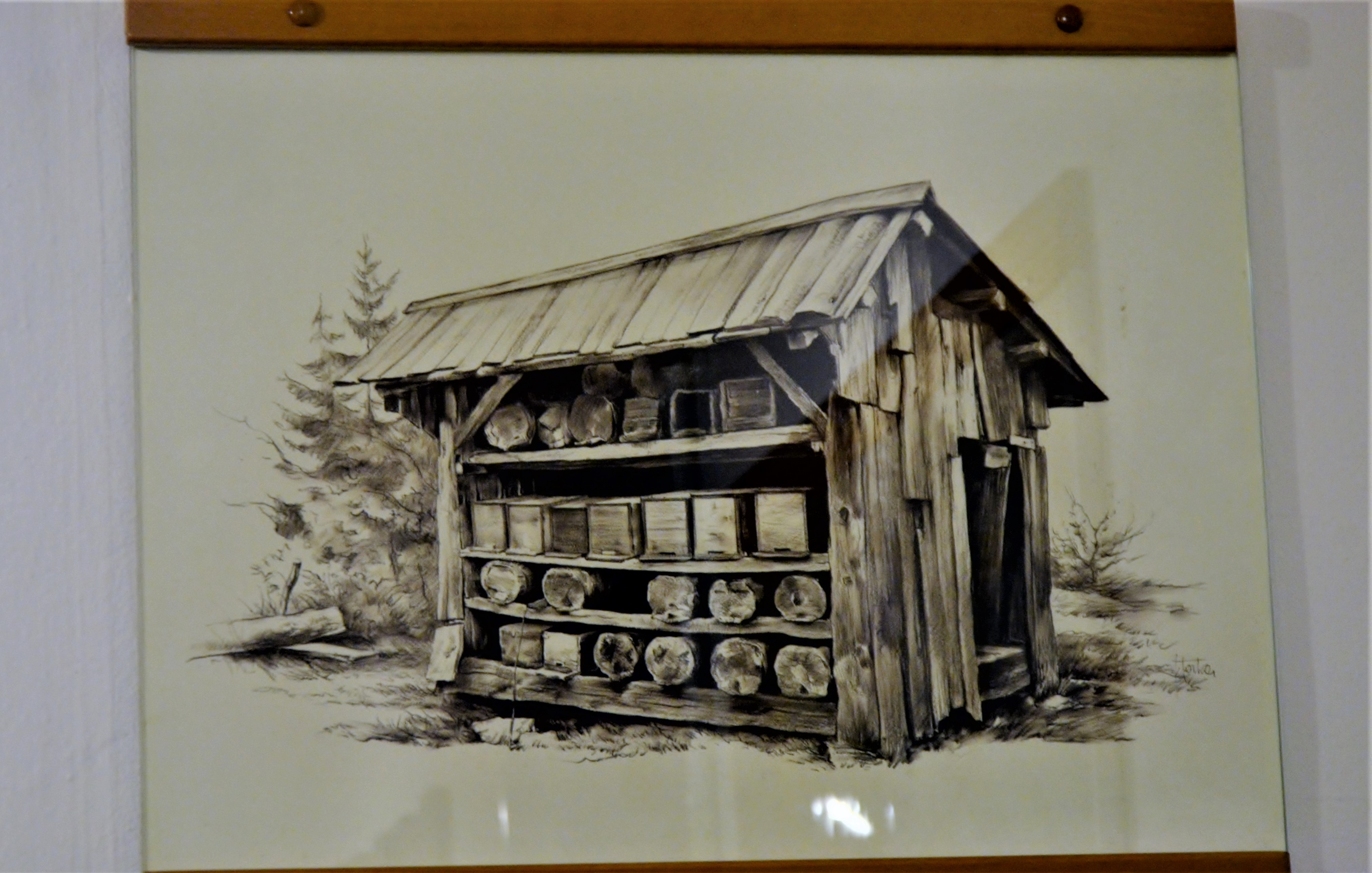
Image of various historical beehives in the Apiculture Museum

The Apiculture Museum (Slovene: Čebelarski muzej) in Radovljica is dedicated to the history of beekeeping in Slovenia and to the Carniolan honey bee in particular. It is housed in a Baroque mansion in the historic center of the town. Founded in 1959, the museum was later incorporated into the Radovljica Municipal Museum. It displays Slovenia's rich beekeeping tradition, an important agricultural activity in the 18th and 19th centuries. Among the exhibitions are traditional beehives and beekeeping tools, the life and work of local beekeepers, and decorative painted beehive panels as unique examples of Slovenian folk art. A bust and copies of books written by the Slovenian beekeeper Anton Janša (1734–1773) are also on display.

=== Gingerbread Museum ===
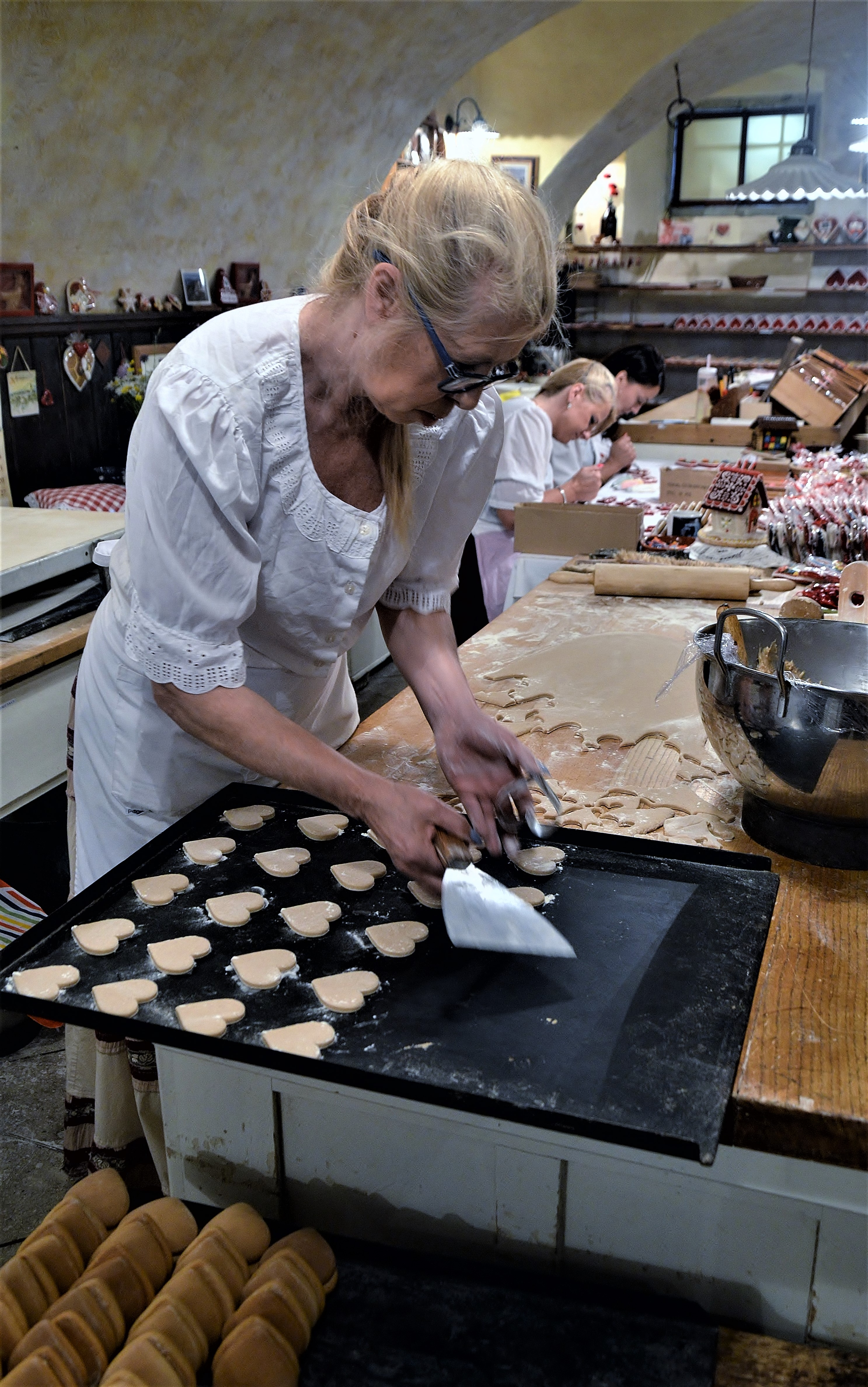
Women baking gingerbread in the museum

The Gingerbread Museum (Slovene: Gostilna Lectar) is a pastry shop dedicated to decorative hard gingerbread (i.e., Lebkuchenherzen), handmade from a honey-based dough mostly shaped into hearts of various size. It is located in a historical house in the old town center of Radovljica. The bakery's workshop is located in the basement, where women in traditional costume show how to bake gingerbread with historical tools and equipment. A café is located on the ground floor.

== Notable people ==
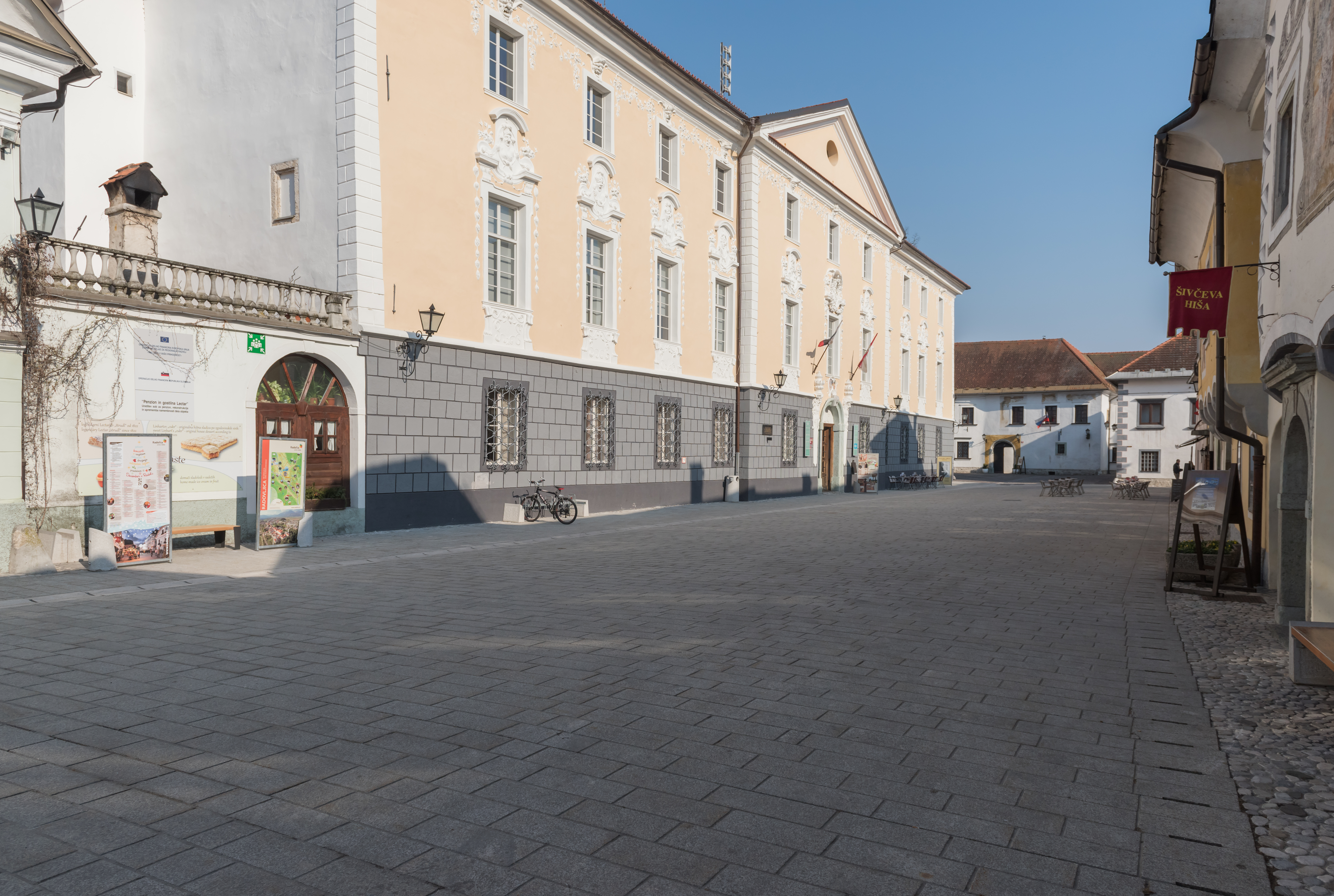
Thurn Castle and presbytery

Notable people that were born or lived in Radovljica include:

- Anton Füster (1808–1881), politician
- Josipina Eleonora Hudovernik (1863–1945) music teacher, headmistress and composer
- Ivan Hribovšek (1923–1945), poet
- Anton Tomaž Linhart (1756–1795), playwright and historian
- Ivan Vurnik (1884–1971), architect
- Iztok Čop (born 1972), rower

== Twin towns ==
- Ivančice (Czech Republic)
- Sondrio (Italy)
- Svilajnac (Serbia)
