= Ivan Hribovšek =

Slovene poet, philologist, and translator (1923–1945)

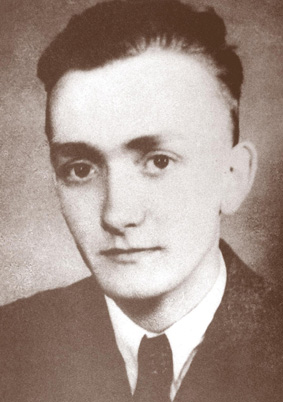
- Born: June 19, 1923; Radovljica, Kingdom of Yugoslavia
- Died: 1945
- Occupations: Poet, philologist, and translator

Ivan Hribovšek (June 19, 1923 – 1945) was a Slovene poet, philologist, and translator.

Hribovšek was born into a well-to-do family of farmers and officials in Radovljica. He spent his early youth on a farm together with his younger sisters and brother. After completing elementary school in Radovljica, in 1934 he enrolled in the St. Stanislaus Institute, the episcopal upper secondary school in Šentvid, Ljubljana. His father died in 1936. In high school, he contributed to two newsletters produced in manuscript: Jutranja zarja (The Dawn) and Domače vaje (Home Exercises). As part of the institute's Palestra cultural association, he gave presentations on Ivan Cankar, Simon Jenko, and Slovenian Expressionism. After the sixth year of the eight-year secondary school program, he transferred to the classical secondary school in Ljubljana and joined Edvard Kocbek's circle, and in 1940 he published his first two poems in the magazine Dejanje.

In 1941, during the German annexation of Upper Carniola, he returned to Radovljica and joined a group of Christian Socialists affiliated with the Liberation Front. In 1941, he translated the entire text of Sophocles' play Antigone. In 1942, he was the editor of an underground newspaper produced by the Christian Socialists called Vogelni kamen, of which two issues were published. He continued his education in Villach, where he graduated in 1943, and the same year he went to Vienna to study classical philology. There he wrote poetry and translated ancient classics, especially the poet Catullus.

Hribovšek participated in the underground patriotic newsletter Dunajske Domače vaje, under the leadership of Janez Remic, together with other Slovenian literati who were studying at the University of Vienna at the time. The magazine ceased publication due to the conscription of his colleagues into the army, but Hribovšek devoted himself intensively to editing his pseudonymous collection of manuscript poetry. The quiet, reserved, and sometimes depressed poet avoided conscription for several months by wandering between Radovljica and Vienna, but in December 1944 he had to decide between serving with the Germans, the Partisans, or the Home Guard, and he chose the Home Guard.

In 1945, he was assigned to a unit in Brezje, and later in Kamna Gorica. At the end of the war, his unit retreated from Kamna Gorica via the Loibl Pass to the camp at Viktring, where he was promoted to officer, and the Home Guard members were disarmed by the British and handed over to Yugoslavia. He disappeared from the historical record in the prison at Teharje. He was most likely murdered in the post-war massacres at the Teharje camp or Kočevje Rog. However, it was also rumored among the Home Guard that he had escaped from prison back to Carinthia, was returning to Yugoslavia to rescue his comrades, and was killed in one such action.

== Literary work ==
Hribovšek's creative period was brief, and so very little of his material remains. In addition, he destroyed his poetry drafts himself. The key material is his letters and poetry manuscripts, which he turned over almost entirely to Anica Resman, his friend and lover. He published only three poems during his lifetime: the poem "Kanal" (later renamed "Rast") in 1939 in the last issue of Domače vaje, and two poems in 1940 in Dejanje: "Ura" and "Rast."

In 1944, just before he joined the army, Hribovšek collected his poems and edited the manuscript poetry collection Pesmi Marjana Gostiše, maja 1944. He gave the manuscript to Anica Resman, who managed to protect it from destruction or confiscation. In 1965, Resman sent the manuscript of the collection to Hribovšek's sister in Argentina, and Tine Debeljak published it under the title Pesem naj zapojem. In Slovenia, like other emigrant literature, it was on the index of banned works and therefore difficult to access. At the end of the 1960s, Jože Javoršek, who had helped him publish poems in Dejanje before the war, sought permission from Hribovšek's relatives to print his poems, but they were afraid "that they would not present Ivan as he was," and, because "in Slovenia the conditions for reprinting his poems have not yet developed," they were not in favor of it. In 1970, Hribovšek was included in the anthology of Slovenian poetryŽivi Orfej. In 1990, his collection Pesmi was published in Slovenia. In 1994, the Slovenian Academy of Sciences and Arts held the Balantičev–Hribovšek Symposium, which also highlighted the banned poet France Balantič.

In 2010, Hribovšek was accepted as a canonical poet in the collection Zbrana dela slovenskih pesnikov in pisateljev (Collected Works of Slovenian Poets and Writers). His poetry was influenced by the Slovenian poetic tradition (Jenko, Kette, and Kocbek), Hölderlin, and Rilke. In his writing, he also made references to ancient lyric poetry. His collection consists of 42 poems and two translations. In the first part, he collected poems about experiencing the spiritual dimension of nature, the second part of the collection is about love, and in the third part he included poems with existential themes, hardships related to war, and the question of life and death. Hribovšek wrote poems in rhyming quatrains and sonnets, and he also used free verse. His papers are held by the National and University Library of Slovenia, the Archiepiscopal Archives of Ljubljana, and private archives.
