= Tine Debeljak =

Slovenian literary critic (1903–1989)

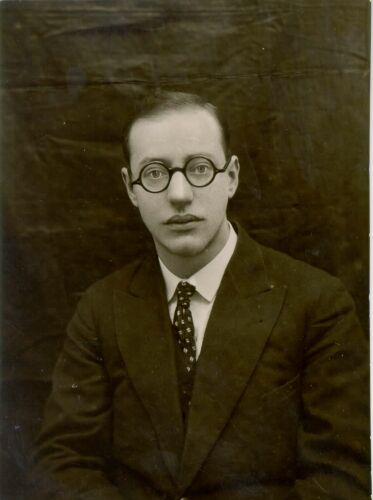
Tine Debeljak

Tine Debeljak (27 April 1903 – 20 January 1989) was a Slovenian literary critic, translator, editor, and poet. Debeljak was born in Škofja Loka. He graduated in 1927 from the University of Ljubljana, where he studied Slavic and comparative literature. In 1948 he emigrated to Argentina.

== Works ==
He translated other works from Czech, Polish, Russian, Hungarian, Spanishand Italian into Slovenian. He was the author of hundreds of articles on literature as well as several books.
