= Josip Marn =

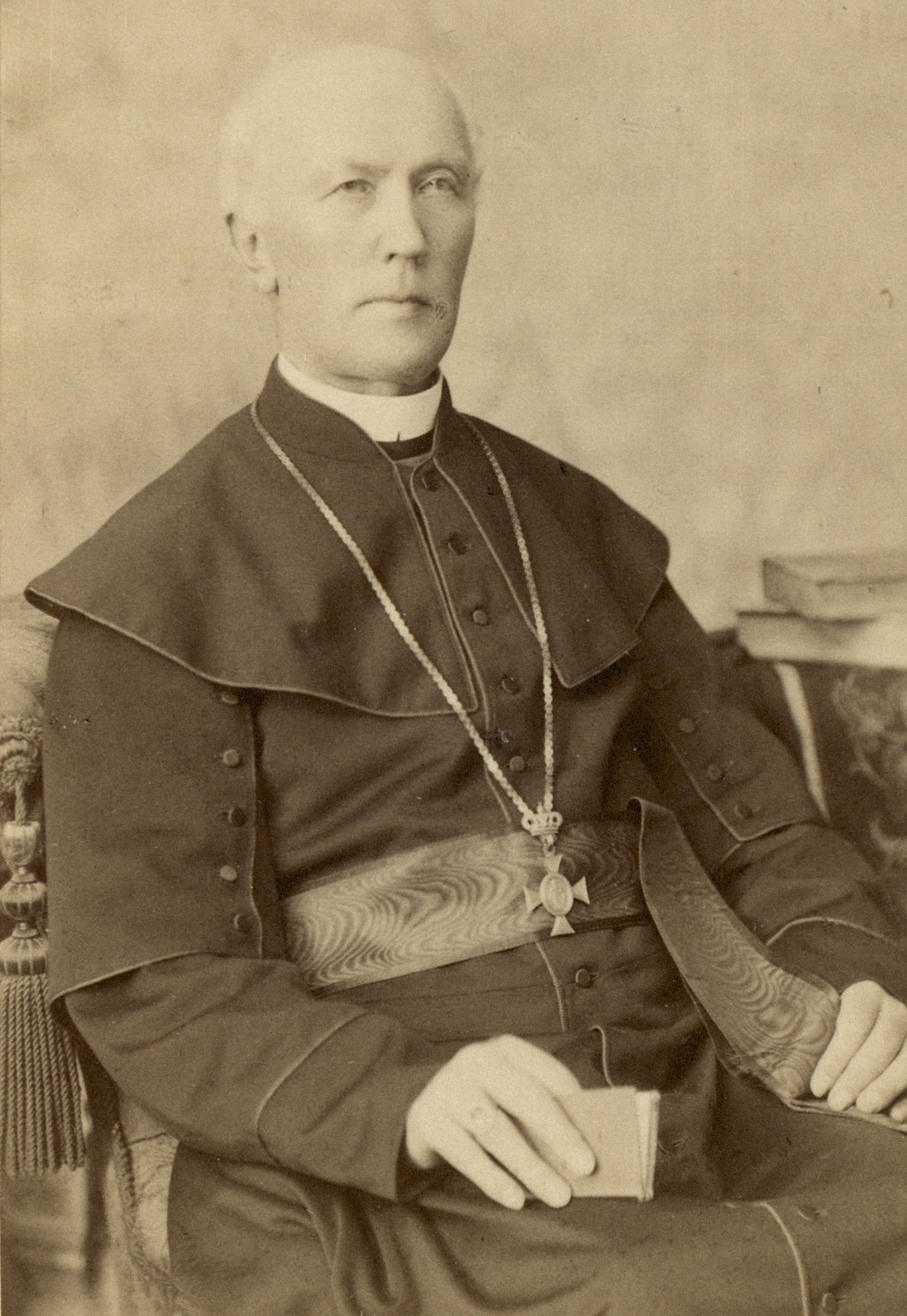
- Born: 13 March 1832; Dragovšek, Austria-Hungary (now in Slovenia)
- Died: 27 January 1893 (aged 60); Ljubljana, Austria-Hungary (now in Slovenia)
- Occupations: Literary historian; journalist; teacher

Josip Marn (13 March 1832 – 27 January 1893) was a Slovene literary historian, journalist, and teacher.

== Life ==
Josip Marn was born in Dragovšek, at that time a hamlet of Štanga, on 13 March 1832. Because there was no primary school in Štanga, he was taught to read and write by the parish priest. He enrolled in a teacher training school in the fall of 1839, in high school in 1843, and in the newly founded Ljubljana boarding school in 1846. He graduated from high school with honors in 1851. However, his poor health prevented him from taking the exit exam—which, however, was not required for studying theology at that time. He was ordained on 21 July 1855 and then appointed a curate in Horjul on 24 September 1855, where he rented a room at his own expense to found a part-time school to teach the local children catechism, reading, and writing.

At the end of the 1857 school year, Franc Serafin Metelko requested retirement as chair for Slovene at the Ljubljana Lyceum, and Bishop Wolf recommended Marn as his successor. Marn then served as alternately as a catechism teacher for the lower years and taught Slovene for the seventh and eighth years. After the death of the catechist Anton Globočnik (1826–1858) and passing a catechism exam, Marn became the permanent lower secondary school catechist on 17 July 1859. On 13 July 1860, after passing a Slovene exam in Vienna under Franz Miklosich, Marn was appointed as a full secondary school instructor. He was appointed a professor on 18 December 1866. He became the head of the Slovene Society's books department in 1882, and served as its chair from 1886 to 1893, where he exerted a decisive influence on its activities.

When he retired in 1892, Marn was awarded the Knight's Cross of the Order of Franz Joseph on 4 October in recognition of his educational work. He had already been recognized for his religious activity by being named honorary canon of the Ljubljana Cathedral Chapter. Marn stated that this distinction was "ample recompense for much contempt and humiliation suffered in the past years."

== Career ==
At the boarding school in Ljubljana, Marn was a favorite of the institution's head, Janez Zlatoust Pogačar, whom he assisted with translations and corrections for his Slovenski verski časopis (Slovene Religious Newspaper). His first publications appeared in 1849 in Ivan Navratil's children's magazine Vedež (Knowledge) as short articles with humorous and serious content: "Blagosrčni mladenič" (The Good-Natured Young Man), "Življenje-leto" (Life: A Year), "Povračilo" (Payment), "Kmet in tatje" (The Farmer and the Thieves), "Skopuha vmori glad pri zakladu" (Hunger Kills a Miser by His Treasure), "Vojak zares junak" (A Soldier, A True Hero), and "Plačilo nehvaležnosti in hudodelstva" (Payment for Ingratitude and Wickedness). In 1852, under the pseudonym Milko, he published the parable "Hrast in lipa" (The Oak and the Linden). As a primary school student, he edited the weekly manuscript publication Daničica (The Little Morning Star), and he contributed the story "7 pivcev o svojih ženah in njih 7 žen o svojih možeh" (Seven Drinkers Talk about Their Wives, and Their Seven Wives Talk about Their Husbands) to Jernej Lenček's almanac Slovenski romar (The Slovenian Pilgrim) in 1852.

Marn's story "Beseda, ktero je govoril bogoslov svojim vrstnikom" (The Word the Theologian Told his Classmates), written in 1853, typifies the orientation that he maintained all his life. It emphasizes both a thorough education in theology as well as the necessity of knowing many languages. In 1855 he assisted in the preparation of Matej Cigale's German–Slovene dictionary. As a curate in Horjul, he translated the first part of the Book of Ezra, Book of Judith, and Book of Esther for an edition of the Bible with commentary by Jožef Franc Allioli published by Bishop Wolf.

As a schoolteacher, he encountered language-related problems. He was required to teach Slovene through German without textbooks, and school grades in Slovene were not taken into account. It was only in January 1860 that Slovene became a required school subject for all ethnic Slovene schoolchildren, and grades in the subject were treated as equivalent to grades in other subjects.

Marn was not an aesthete, as is shown in his praise of Umek's poems and his Abuna Soliman, which he used with the permission of school superintendent Anton Jarc alongside the Berilo (Reader) until 1868, when Anton Janežič's Cvetnik slovenske slovesnosti (Anthology of Slovene Literature) was published. This method of teaching Slovene was resisted by his pupils Josip Jurčič, Fran Levec, and Janko Kersnik, and was also criticized by Josip Stritar in his Kritična pisma (Critical Letters). After 1860 he wrote the work Slovanskiga cerkveniga jezika pravo imé, pervotna domovina in razmera proti sedanjim slovanskim jezikom (The True Name of the Church Slavic Language, Its Original Homeland, and Relations with Today's Slavic Languages) based on the works of Jernej Kopitar and Franz Miklosich. From 1863 until his death he published the newsletter Jezičnik (The Prattler), a supplement to Bishop Wolf's Učiteljski tovariš (Teacher's Friend), for which he wrote linguistics articles, overviews of Slovene literature, and extensive biographical, bibliographical, and literary-history articles about Metelko, Kopitar, and Janez Bleiweis; after 1883 these works appeared under the joint title Knjiga slovenska (The Slovene Book).

== Selected works ==
- Kopitarjeva spomenica (A Kopitar Memorial Volume), 1880
- Jezičnik (The Prattler), 1863–1892
- Josip Marn, vitez Fran-Josipovega reda (Josip Marn, Knight of the Order of Franz Joseph), 1892
- Kratka staroslovenska slovnica (A Concise Old Slavic Grammar), 1863
- Slovanskiga cerkveniga jezika pravo imé, pervotna domovina in razmera proti sedanjim slovanskim jezikom (The True Name of the Church Slavic Language, Its Original Homeland, and Relations with Today's Slavic Languages), after 1860

== Works about Josip Marn ==
- Dušan Mevlja. 1988. "Josip Marn: ob 95-letnici smrti." Večer 44(21): 14.
- Andrijan Lah. 2002. "Josip Marn: naša kultura." Ave Maria 94(5): 108–109.
- Andrijan Lah. 1993. "Ob stoletnici smrti Josipa Marna." Mohorjev koledar 69–71.
