= Prosveta =

Prosveta can refer to:

- Prosveta Publishing House, of the Bulgarian state
- Prosveta (Enlightenment), a newspaper published by the Slovene National Benefit Society
- Prosveta (newspaper), a Slovene newspaper published in the U.S. during WWII

== See also ==
- Prosvjeta
