= Digital Library of Slovenia =

Coordinates: 46°2′51.18″N 14°30′13.31″E

The Digital Library of Slovenia (Slovene: Digitalna knjižnica Slovenije, short: dLib) is an Internet service—since 2006 a part of European Library—that allows access to digitalized material from the National and University Library of Slovenia.

== Collections ==
Since 2005, its web portal offers a free search through sources and free access to Slovene newspapers, periodicals, books, manuscripts, map, photographs, music and manuals, and other resources.

- articles from older Slovene newspapers, such as (Kmetijske in rokodelske novice, Ljubljanski zvon, Dom in svet, Novi akordi, Sodobnost, Štajerc, and Nova muzika).
- more than 10,500 items in the photos collection, which includes the photos of caricatures, drawn by Maksim Gaspari and Hinko Smrekar; reproductions of Ivan Cankar's drawings and manuscripts; and postcards with Jurij Vega, France Prešeren, and old Ljubljana
- books from 1830 until today provides free access to some of the most important works of the Slovenian authors, such as Ivan Cankar's Erotika, Nina, Hlapci; Dragotin Kette's Poezije; Josip Murn's Pesmi in romance.
- more than 3,000 scholarly articles published in many internationally recognised professional and scientific journals.
- a collection of 4,000 advertising, promotional, film, and war posters
- more than 1,000 items of sheet music, including one of the first arrangements of Prešeren's Zdravica (Slovenian national anthem); compositions by the Ipavec family, Danilo Fajgelj, Risto Savin, Stanko Premrl, Emil Adamič, Slavko Osterc, Marij Kogoj; and arrangements of the Slovenian folk songs and the songs from the turning points in the Slovene history
- the selection of old maps, including Valvasor's maps of Carniola, and old city plans of Ljubljana (from 1820 to 1920).
- recordings of solo singers and ensembles dating from the beginning of the 20th century, including a wide range of Slovene folk songs.

== See also ==
- National and University Library of Slovenia
- European Library
