= Dupeljne =

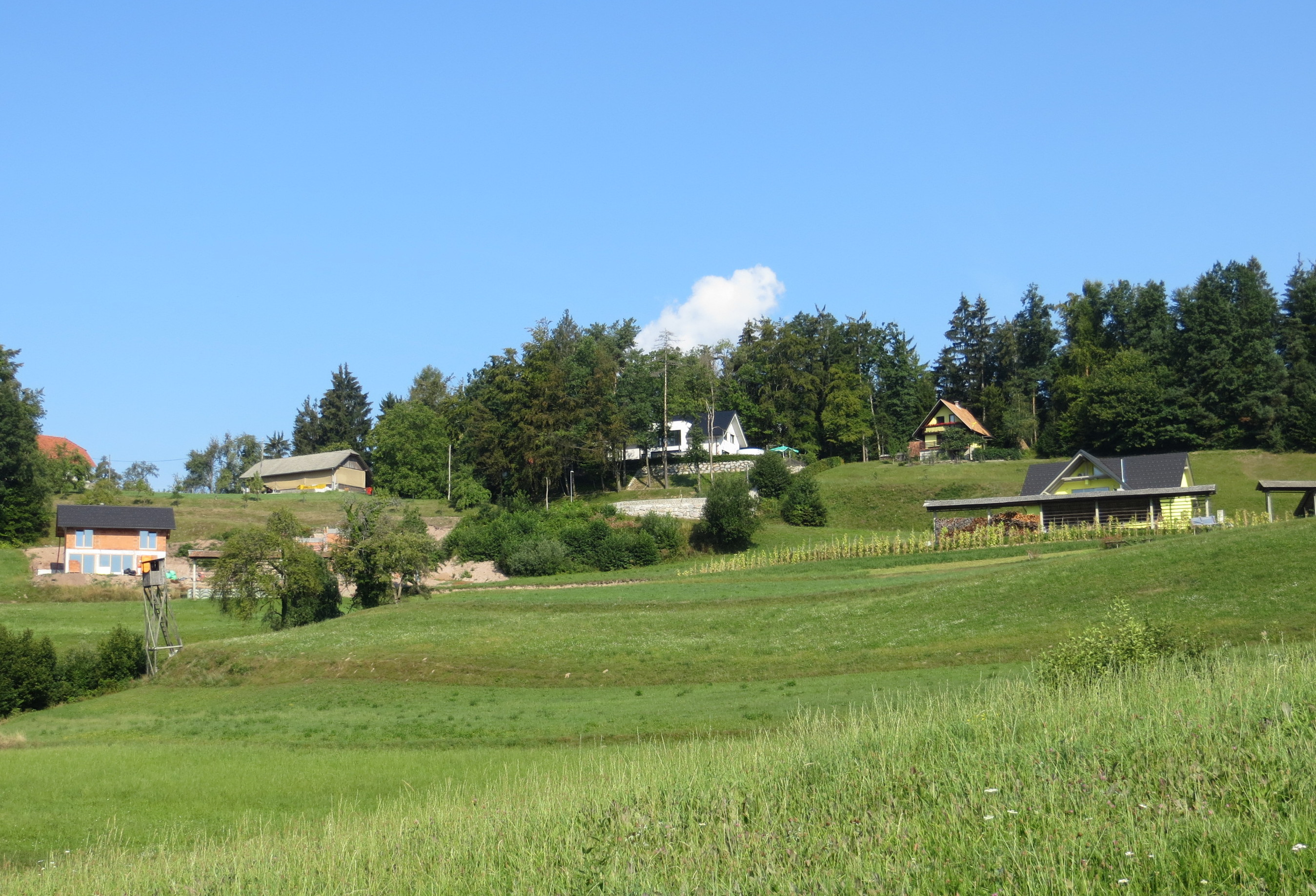

- Location in Slovenia
- Coordinates: 46°11′30.88″N 14°40′34″E
- Country: Slovenia
- Traditional region: Upper Carniola
- Statistical region: Central Slovenia
- Municipality: Lukovica

Area
  - Total: 0.67 km^{2} (0.26 sq mi)
- Elevation: 544.3 m (1,786 ft)

Population (2002)
  - Total: 51

Dupeljne (pronounced [ˈduːpəlnɛ]) is a small settlement in the hills north of Lukovica pri Domžalah in the eastern part of the Upper Carniola region of Slovenia.

== Name ==
Dupeljne was first attested in written sources in 1348 as Tewpplach (and in 1353 as zu dem Dupelnik). The old attestations are based on a locative plural form, probably based on the plural demonym *Dupljane. The name is derived from the Slovene common noun dupel 'hollow', referring to a local geographical feature.

== History ==
Dupeljne was mentioned in Johann Weikhard von Valvasor's 17th-century work The Glory of the Duchy of Carniola. He described the local people as speaking a slow dialect and being deliberate thinkers. During the Second World War, locals from Dupeljne helped care for wounded Partisan soldiers and supplied the Partisans' Triglav Hospital (a.k.a. Luk Hospital, Slovene: Lukova bolnica) near Kolovec. On 13 December 1942, German forces attacked a detachment of Partisans from Kamnik between Kolovec and Dupeljne, who then withdrew to Dupeljne.

== Notable people ==
Notable people that were born or lived in Dupeljne include:

- Jakob Grčar (1889–1966), journalist and singer
