= Ciklamen =

1883 novel by Janko Kersnik

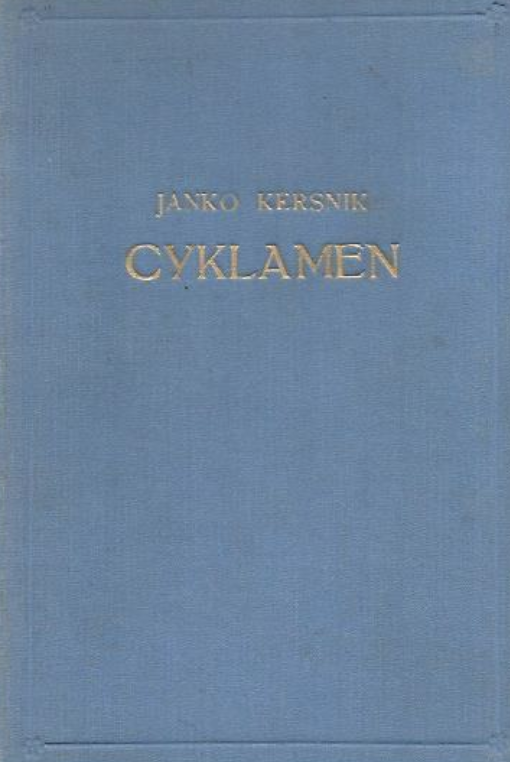
- Author: Janko Kersnik
- Language: Slovenian
- Genre: Romantic novel
- Publisher: Ljubljanski zvon
- Publication date: 1883
- Publication place: Slovenia
- Media type: hardcover
- Pages: 111

Ciklamen is a novel by Slovenian author Janko Kersnik. It was first published in 1883 in Ljubljanski zvon. The book was digitized in 2022 (116 pages, ISBN 9789612800598).

== Content ==
The story happened in 1872, but chapter V. tracks back to 1872. The author describes the life of the people of Borje, a small settlement in Carniola. The protagonist is a country jurist Dr Hrast and he is in love with German governess Elza. She, however, later married German nobleman Meden. Dr Hrast then turns his interests to his adolescent love Katlinka, now the wife of a rich sick landowner. After the death of the landowner, she married Dr Hrast.

The writer is not only focusing on love stories but also on descriptions of scenery and cultural events, that took place in reading society. Janko is also an emphasizing Slovene national consciousness and values characters based on this.

== See also ==
- List of Slovenian novels
