= Brdo Castle =

Brdo Castle (Slovene: grad Brdo) may refer to:

- Brdo Castle near Kranj, a mansion and estate in northwestern Slovenia
- Brdo pri Lukovici#Castle, a mansion in central Slovenia
