= Rokovnjači =

1881 novel by Josip Jurčič

- Authors: Josip Jurčič, Janko Kersnik
- Language: Slovenian
- Publication date: January 1881
- Publication place: Slovenia

Rokovnjači (The Bandits) is a historical novel by the Slovene authors Josip Jurčič and Janko Kersnik. It was first published in 1881 in Ljubljanski zvon by Kersnik, who, following Jurčič’s instructions and drafts—Jurčič having written the first eleven chapters—completed the remaining thirteen chapters of the book.

== See also ==
- List of Slovenian novels
