= List of Slovene newspapers =

This article is a list of historical Slovene newspapers that were published in Slovene.

- 1888–1944 Dom in svet, literary monthly
- 1938–1941 Dejanje, Christian left journal
- 1876–1928 Edinost, Slovene daily in Trieste
- Glas naroda
- 1918–1928 Goriška straža, newspaper for the Slovenes of Goriška under Italian administration
- 1819–1849 Illyrisches Blatt, Slovene and German intellectual, France Prešeren's Wreath of Sonnets was first published in it
- 1920–1945 Jutro, leading interwar liberal newspaper
- 1843-1902 Kmetijske in rokodelske novice, started as an agricultural and craftmen's publication but became a conservative political and literary newspaper
- 1907–1911 Korošec, weekly newspaper of Carinthian Slovenes
- 1920–1938 Koroški Slovenec, main newspaper of the Carinthian Slovenes in the First Austrian Republic
- 1830–1848 Krajnska čbelica, literary almanac
- 1924–1930 Križ na gori (later Križ), Christian left magazine
- 1881–1941 Ljubljanski zvon, literary
- 1797–1800 Lublanske novice, general newspaper, its editor was Valentin Vodnik
- from 17 September 1944 until the end of the Second World War Partizanski dnevnik, the only daily newspaper published by a resistance group in occupied Europe
- Prosveta, published in USA
- 1873–1945 Slovenec, Catholic political
- 1858–1869 Slovenski glasnik, cultural magazine, published in Klagenfurt
- 1868–1943 Slovenski narod, leading Slovene liberal newspaper
- 1881–1940 Slovenski pravnik, legal herald
- 1871–1915 Soča, Slovene newspaper published in Gorizia, also published illegally in fascist Italy in 1927
- 1934–1941 Straža v viharju, journal of the Slovene Integralist Catholic youth
- 1966–1990 Zaliv, Slovene cultural and intellectual review, published in Trieste, Italy

== See also ==
- List of newspapers in Slovenia
- List of magazines in Slovenia
