= Anton Funtek =

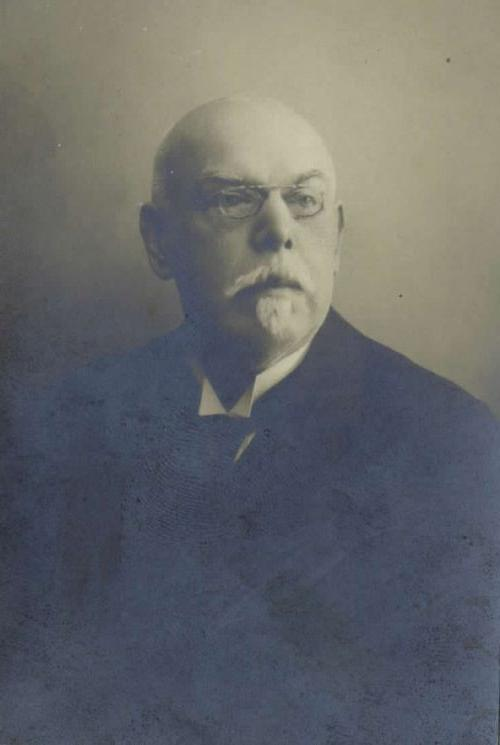
- Born: 30 October 1862; Ljubljana, Austrian Empire (now Slovenia)
- Died: 21 October 1932 (aged 69); Ljubljana, Kingdom of Yugoslavia (now Slovenia)
- Occupations: Writer; poet; translator; editor

Anton Funtek (30 October 1862 – 21 October 1932) was a Slovene writer, poet, editor and translator.

Funtek was born in Ljubljana that was then part of the Austrian Empire, now the capital of Slovenia. He trained as a teacher and worked in Litija and Šentvid pri Stični before going to a Technical college in Vienna. He then worked as a secondary school teacher in Ljubljana until his retirement in 1925. He was editor of the journal Ljubljanski zvon between 1891 and 1894 and editor of the newspaper Laibacher Zeitung for a number of years. For a while he was also president of the Slovene Writers' Association. He is known for his translations into Slovene of Shakespeare's King Lear, Schiller's Song of the Bell, the first part of Goethe's Faust and The Sunken Bell by Gerhart Hauptmann.
