= Na Žerinjah =

1876 novel by Slovenian author Janko Kersnik

- Author: Janko Kersnik
- Language: Slovenian
- Publication date: 1876
- Publication place: Slovenia
- Pages: 188

Na Žerinjah is a novel by Slovenian author Janko Kersnik. It was first published in 1876 in Slovenska knjižnica, by Josip Jurčič.

== See also ==
- List of Slovenian novels
