= Dragovšek =

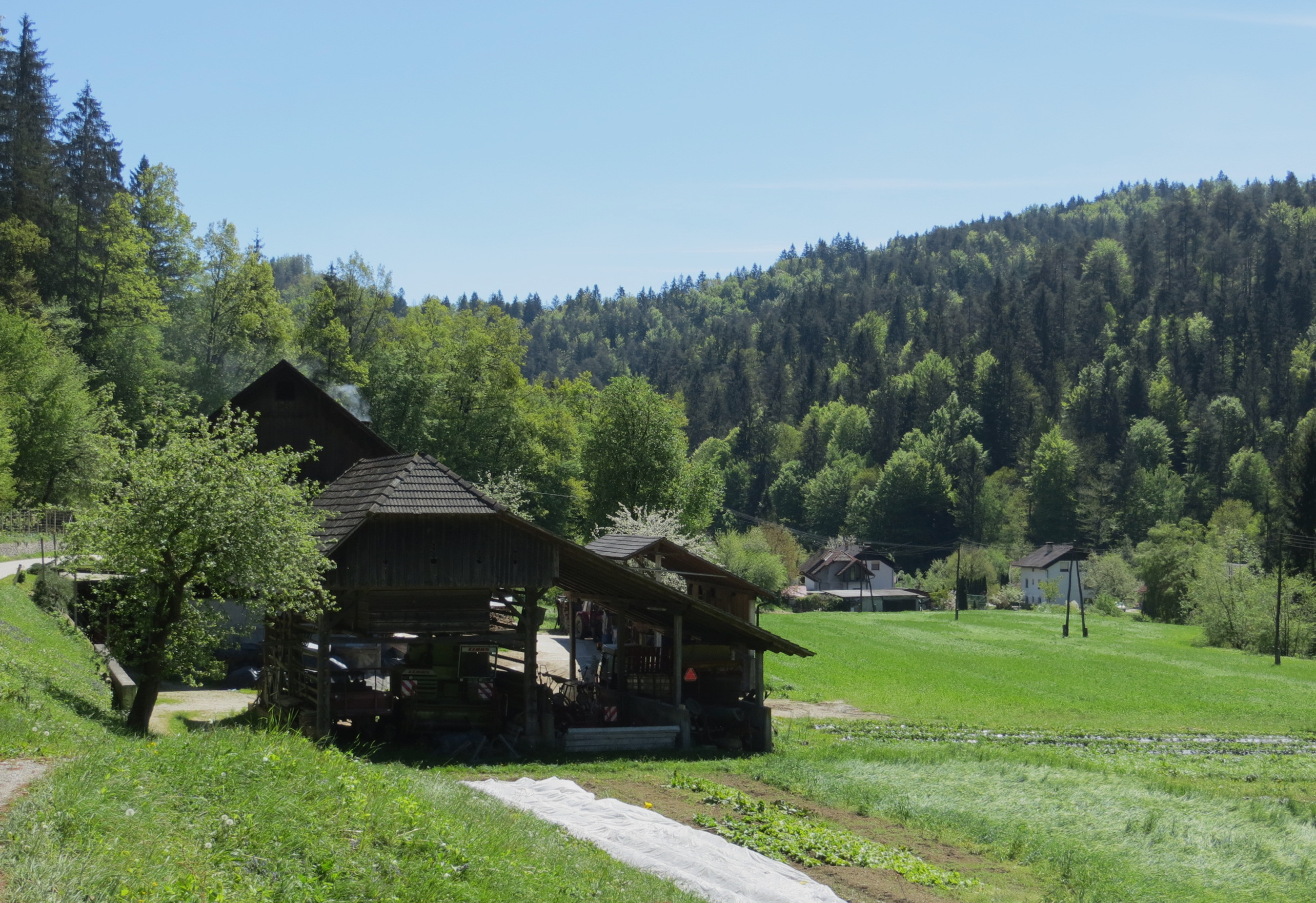

- Location in Slovenia
- Coordinates: 46°2′31.52″N 14°47′11.11″E
- Country: Slovenia
- Traditional region: Lower Carniola
- Statistical region: Central Slovenia
- Municipality: Šmartno pri Litiji

Area
  - Total: 1.74 km^{2} (0.67 sq mi)
- Elevation: 383.3 m (1,258 ft)

Population (2002)
  - Total: 82

Dragovšek (pronounced [ˈdɾaːɡɔu̯ʃək]) is a dispersed settlement in the hills west of Šmartno pri Litiji in central Slovenia. The area is part of the historical region of Lower Carniola. The Municipality of Šmartno pri Litiji is now included in the Central Slovenia Statistical Region.

== Notable people ==
Notable people that were born or lived in Dragovšek include:

- Josip Marn (1832–1893), literary historian
