= France Vodnik =

Slovenian writer (1903–1986)

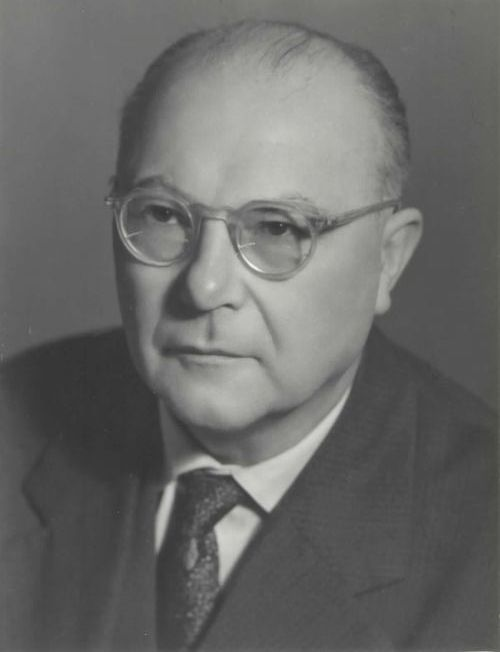
Vodnik in 1963

France Vodnik (1903–1986) was a Slovenian literary critic, essayist, translator and poet from Ljubljana. He was mostly active in the interwar period, when Slovenia was part of the Kingdom of Yugoslavia. He was the younger brother of the poet and critic Anton Vodnik.

Vodnik completed philosophy studies at the University of Ljubljana. France Vodnik was one of the main exponent of Slovene Christian left intellectuals who gathered around the journal Križ na gori (Cross on the Mountain). Together with the poet and thinker Edvard Kocbek, Vodnik was one of the first Slovene Roman Catholic intellectuals to profess the Personalist philosophy.

Vodnik emerged in the 1920s as a literary critic and columnist in the liberal conservative journal Dom in svet. By the mid-1930s, he was considered one of the most influential Slovene critics, together with the left liberal Josip Vidmar and the Marxist Ivo Brnčić, with whom he frequently polemized. He was a strong supporter of Slovenian cultural and political autonomy within Yugoslavia.

He also published a collection of poetry, entitled "The Fighter with God" (Borivec z Bogom), mostly composed of religious and mystical poems.

After World War II, his influence was largely reduced. In the first post-war decades, he mostly worked as a translator, mostly from Polish. Among other, he translated works by Sienkiewicz, Stefan Żeromski, Jerzy Andrzejewski, Jarosław Iwaszkiewicz, Maria Dabrowska, Jan Dobraczynski, Kazimierz Moczarski, and Stanislaw Lem into Slovene. He also compiled a Slovene-Polish dictionary, published in 1977. In the 1960s and early 1970s, several collections of his essays were published.

He died in Ljubljana.

== Major works ==
- Slovenska religiozna lirika ('Slovene Religious Lyrical Poems', editor); 1928.
- Prešernov svetovni nazor ('Prešeren's World View'); 1929.
- Borivec z Bogom ('The Fighter with God'); 1932.
- Ideja in kvaliteta : kritike in eseji ('Idea and Quality: Critiques and Essays'); 1964.
- Kritična dramaturgija ('Critical Drama Theory'); 1968.
- Prevrednotenja ('Revaluations'); 1971.
- Od obzorja do obzorja ('From Horizon to Horizon'); 1972.
- Dialektika in metafizika slovenstva ('The Dialectics and Metaphysics of Slovene-ness'. Collections of essays from the 1920s and 1930s); 1983
