= Podsmreka pri Velikih Laščah =

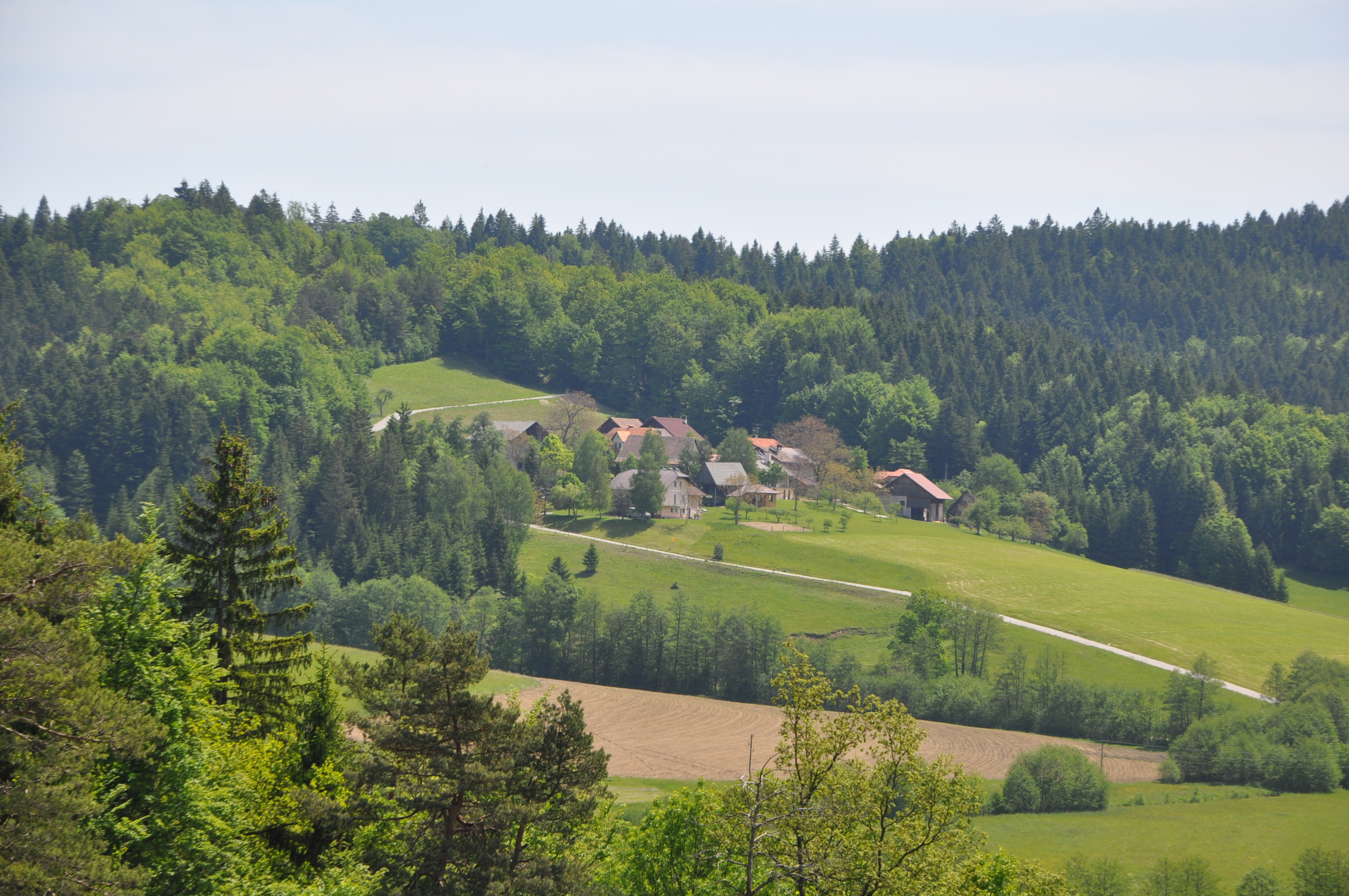

- Location in Slovenia
- Coordinates: 45°49′38.86″N 14°36′18.87″E
- Country: Slovenia
- Traditional region: Lower Carniola
- Statistical region: Central Slovenia
- Municipality: Velike Lašče

Area
  - Total: 0.37 km^{2} (0.14 sq mi)
- Elevation: 540.6 m (1,774 ft)

Population (2002)
  - Total: 24
- Postal code: 1315

Podsmreka pri Velikih Laščah (pronounced [pɔtˈsmɾeːka pɾi ˈʋeːlikix ˈlaːʃtʃax]) is a small settlement west of Velike Lašče in central Slovenia. The entire Municipality of Velike Lašče is part of the traditional region of Lower Carniola and is now included in the Central Slovenia Statistical Region.

== Name ==
The name of the settlement was changed from Podsmreka to Podsmreka pri Velikih Laščah in 1987.

== Notable people ==
The Slovene writer Josip Stritar was born in the settlement in 1836. The house where he was born has been substantially remodeled, and a commemorative plaque with a relief portrait of the author was unveiled on it in 1936.
