= Kolovec =

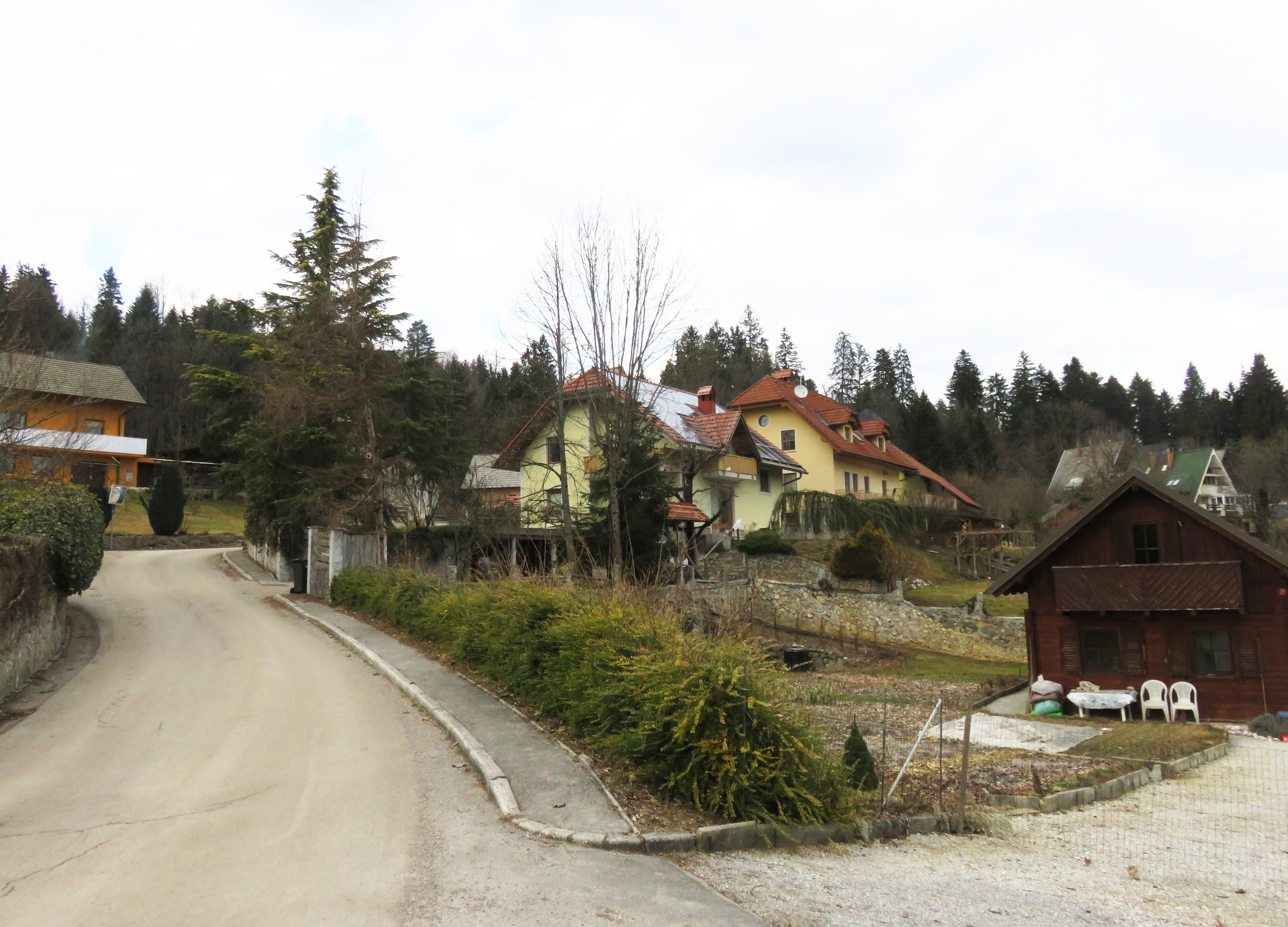

- Location in Slovenia
- Coordinates: 46°11′39.9″N 14°38′28.48″E
- Country: Slovenia
- Traditional region: Upper Carniola
- Statistical region: Central Slovenia
- Municipality: Domžale

Area
  - Total: 5.61 km^{2} (2.17 sq mi)
- Elevation: 388.4 m (1,274 ft)

Population (2020)
  - Total: 58
  - Density: 10/km^{2} (27/sq mi)

Kolovec (pronounced [ˈkoːlɔʋəts]; German: Gerlachstein) is a settlement northeast of Domžale in the Upper Carniola region of Slovenia.

== History ==
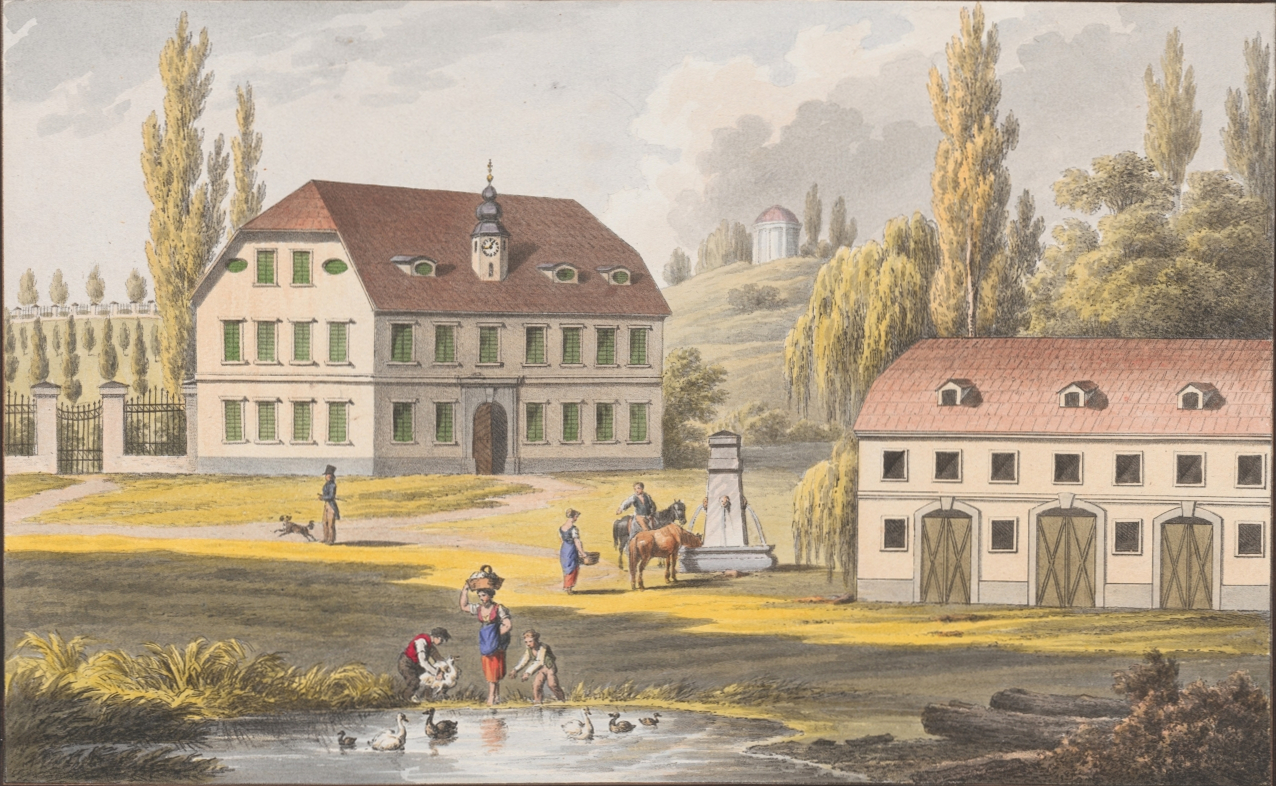
Kolovec in 1820

The Kolovec area was settled in Roman times, as attested by the discovery of artifacts there. Until the 19th century, bandits were active in the area; the Paleževina farm was owned by a bandit chief named Groga circa 1810, and the Čeh farm northwest of the village center was portrayed in Josip Jurčič's novel Rokovnjači (The Bandits) as the Mozolovina farm. During the Second World War, the Partisans stored food and weapons in the forest near Kolovec.

== Castles ==
Kolovec was the site of two castles in the past. Both are mentioned and depicted by Johann Weikhard von Valvasor in his The Glory of the Duchy of Carniola as Gerlachstein.

=== Old Gerlachstein Castle ===
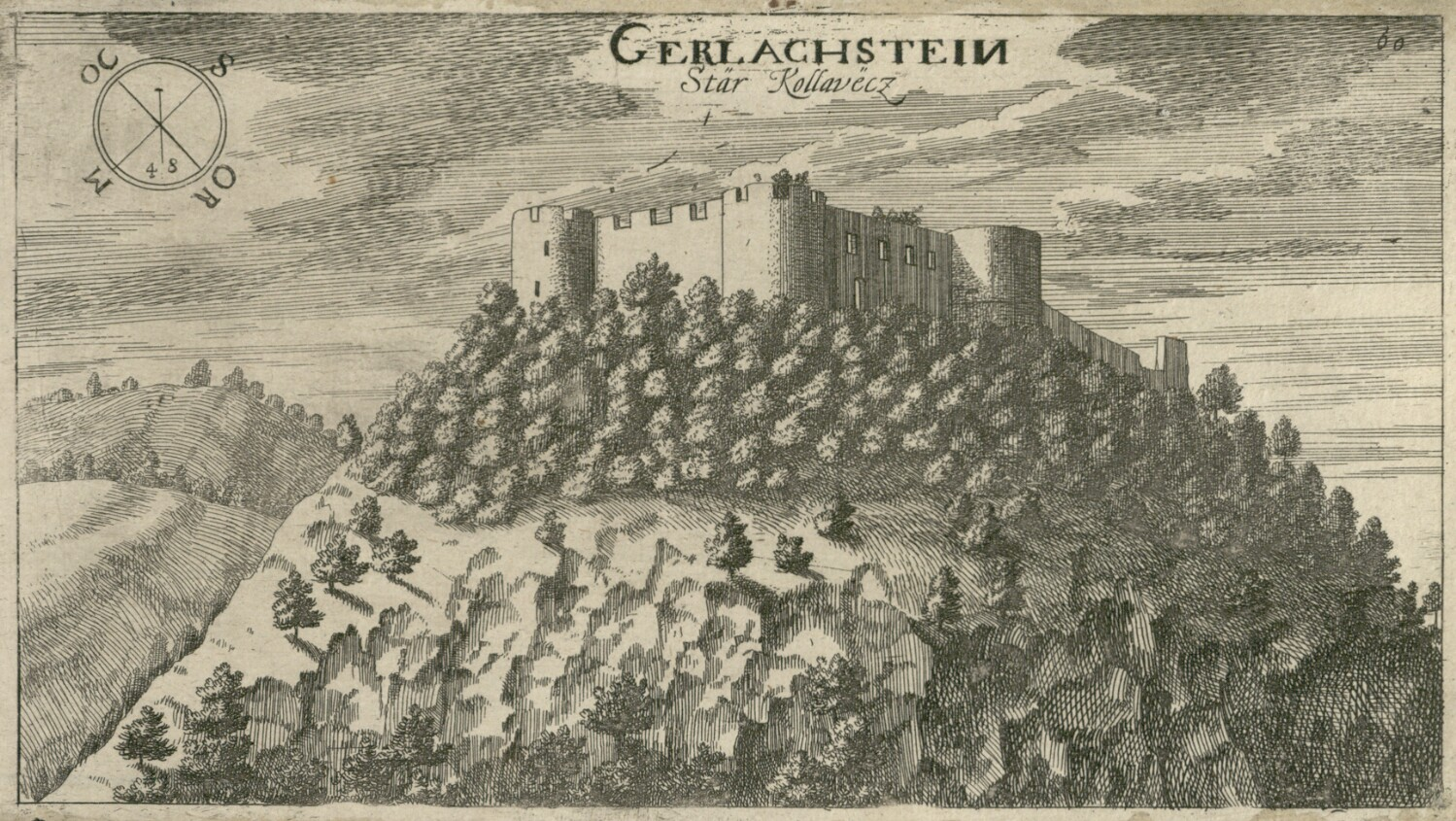
Valvasor's illustration of the castle

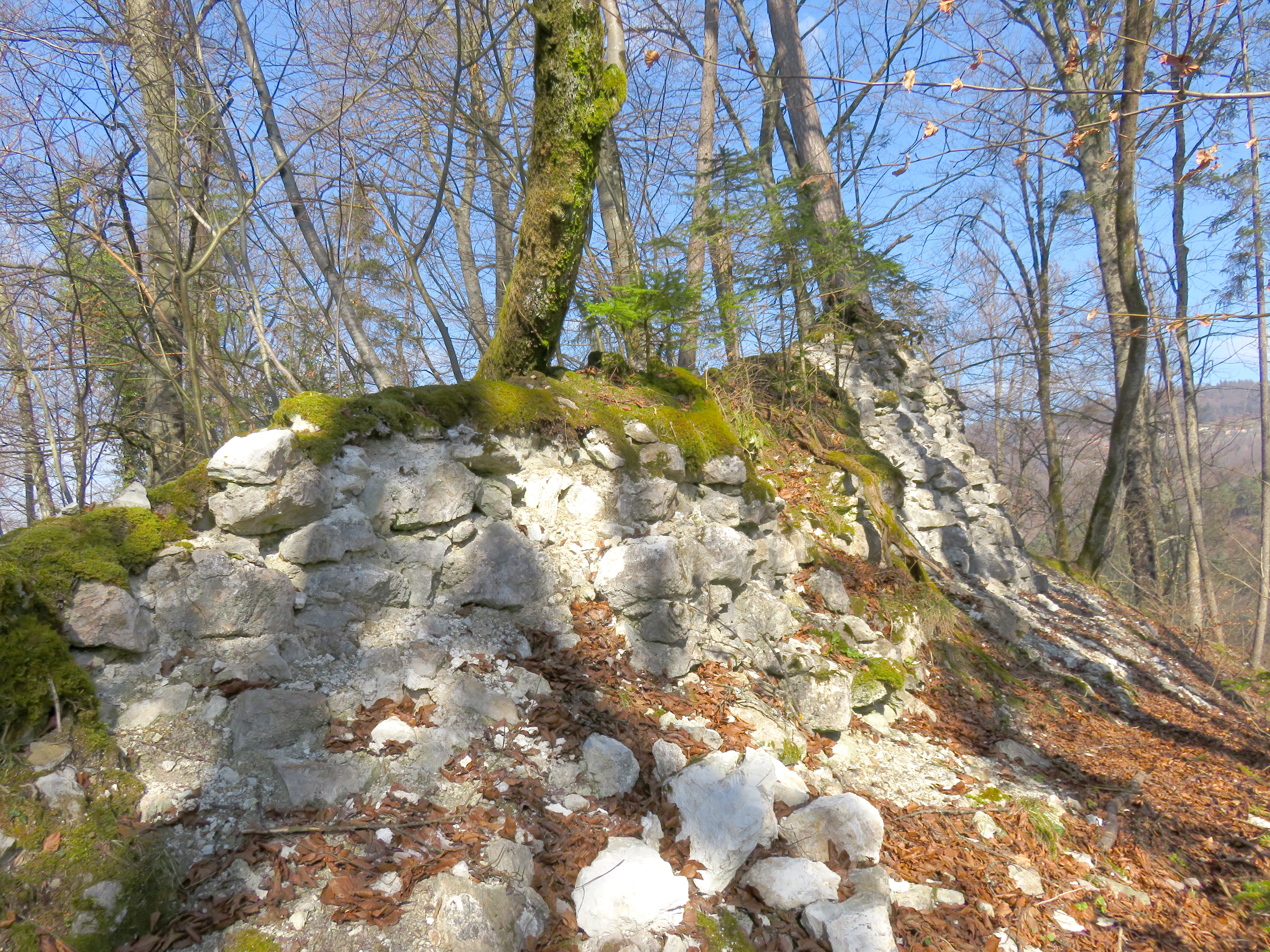
Castle ruins

Old Gerlachstein Castle

Old Gerlachstein Castle, also known as Kolovec Castle (Slovene: Kolovški grad), stood on a hill northeast of the settlement and was built in the 12th century. It burned down in 1560, and the site was abandoned. Today it is referred to in Slovene as Stari grad 'the old castle'. The ruins of the castle are still visible.

=== New Gerlachstein Castle ===
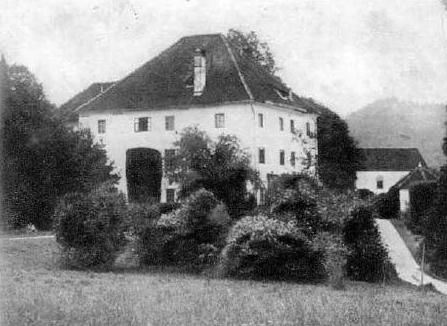
Before the Second World War

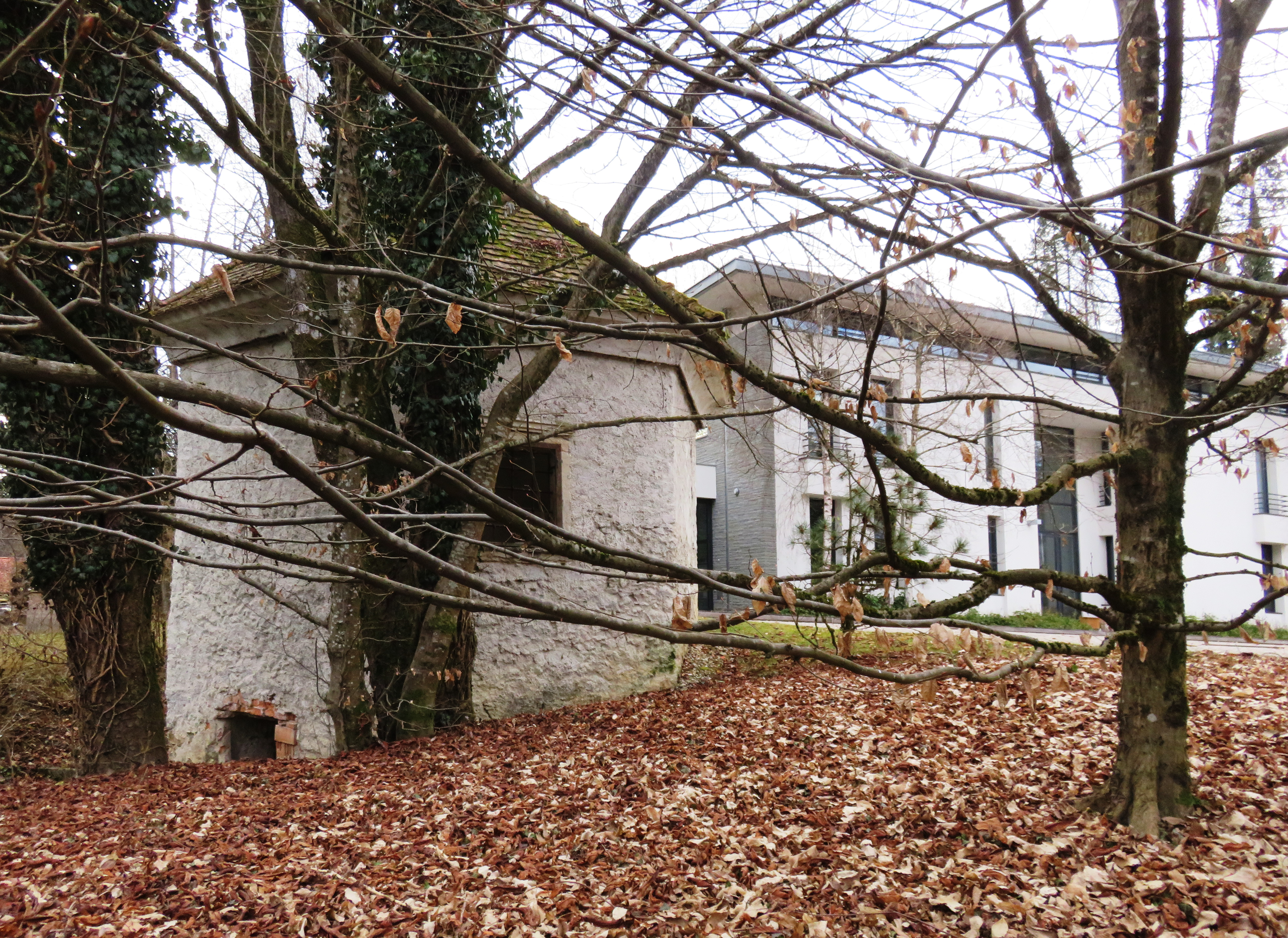
Castle chapel

New Gerlachstein Castle

The second castle, built just outside the settlement to the southwest, was built in 1530. It burned down in 1679, but was rebuilt by the owners. During the Second World War it was used by the German army as its local headquarters until 1942, and it was burned down by Partisans in April 1943, supposedly to prevent the army from using it again. The remains are barely visible today.

== Notable people ==
Notable people that were born or lived in Kolovec include:

- Franz Erasmus von Hohenwart (1650–1714), hereditary cupbearer and genealogist
