= Anton Vodnik =

Slovenian poet (1902–1965)

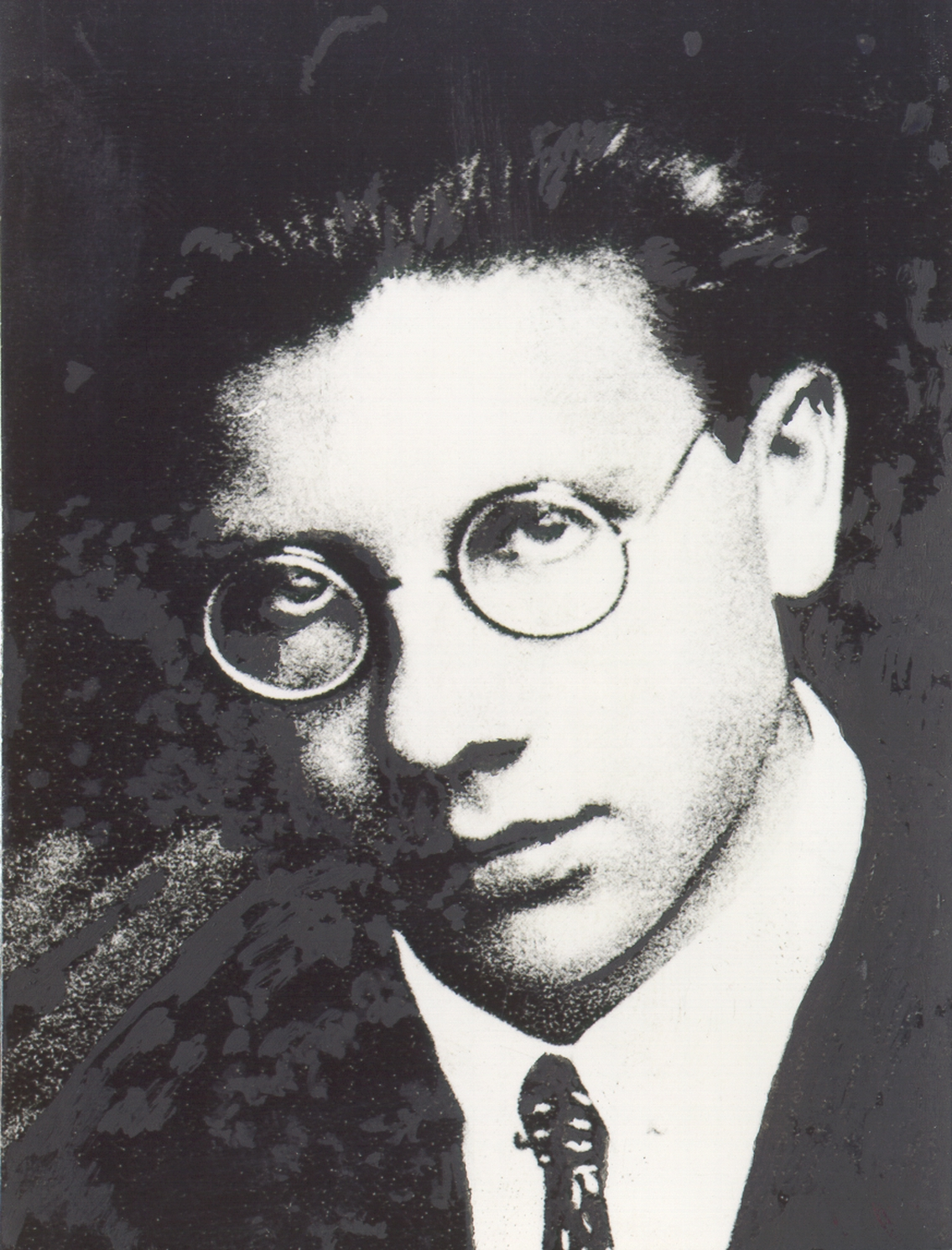
- Vodnik in the 1920s
- Born: May 28, 1901; Podutik, Ljubljana, Austria-Hungary (now in Slovenia)
- Died: October 2, 1965 (aged 64); Ljubljana, Slovenia, Yugoslavia
- Occupations: Poet; art historian; critic
- Writing career
- Literary movement: Expressionism, Symbolism

Anton Vodnik (pronounced [anˈtóːn ˈʋóːdnik]; 28 May 1901 – 2 October 1965) was a Slovenian poet, art historian, and critic. He was one of the most notable representatives of Slovene Catholic expressionism in the interwar period.

He was born in Ljubljana, and studied art history at the University of Vienna. He was member of the circle of young Slovene Catholic intellectuals gathered around the Christian left journal Križ na gori. In the late 1920s and early 1930s, he emerged as a renowned polemicist, especially directed against the influential left liberal critic Josip Vidmar, with whom he nevertheless maintained a cordial relationship. In the 1930s, he became one of the most notable contributors to the Catholic literary journal Dom in svet.

Vodnik published his first collection of poetry in 1920. His poetics was strongly influenced by late fin-de-siècle symbolism, especially Rilke and Maurice Maeterlinck. Vodnik was influential as a poet especially during the 1920s, while since the 1930s, his influence started to decline, due to the popularity of social realism and the emergence of a new aesthetic sensibility among young Catholic authors that embraced new objectivity on one hand, and a more mystical tradition on the other. During the World War II in Yugoslavia Vodnik participated in activities of Osvobodilna fronta.

He died in Ljubljana.

He was married to the teacher and editor Doroteja Vodnik (a.k.a. Pegam) (sl). He was the brother of the literary critic France Vodnik.
