= Dom in svet =

Catholic cultural and literary journal published in Slovenia

- Categories: Literary and cultural magazine
- First issue: 1888
- Final issue: 1943
- Country: Slovenia
- Language: Slovene

Dom in svet ('Home and World') was a Catholic cultural and literary journal published in Slovenia.

== History and profile ==
Dom in svet was published from 1888 to 1943. Its long-running rivalry with the national-liberal journal Ljubljanski zvon was a major feature of Slovenian cultural life in the late 19th and early 20th centuries; historian Péter Krasztev describes the "clear-cut distinction between liberal and conservative" the pair of journals produced as "striking and uncharacteristic of the region".

Dom in svet was founded in 1888 by the conservative Catholic editor Frančišek Lampe. It opposed both naturalist and avant-garde experimentations with Modernism, especially the Decadent movement, attacking Slovene and other Slavic writers whom they saw as their regional representatives, such as Anton Aškerc and Jaroslav Vrchlický. Instead the editorial line "steadily opposed the loosening of literary form and insisted on Christian-national and Pan-Slavic values". Nonetheless, it was diligent in reporting on Modernism and foreign literature: it published discussions of l'art pour l'art and the works of Schopenhauer and Tolstoy in its first few years in print, and in 1901 published a thorough review (by Lampe) of the past 20 years of European literature.

Its editorial line remained conservative and opposed Modernism up to the early 20th century, under the influence of the integralist Catholic theologian Anton Mahnič. It assumed a more liberal direction in 1914, under the new editorship of Izidor Cankar, a prominent liberal Catholic essayist and art historian. Under Cankar, the journal reviewed art from more aesthetic perspective, and helped the Slovene Catholic establishment shed some of its anti-intellectual reputation. During the 1920s and 1930s, the journal adopted a moderate and liberal conservative stance, although it maintained a relatively open editorial policy towards other currents of Slovene Catholicism, especially the Christian left. In these two decades, the journal became one of the most progressive attitudes towards literature in Slovenia, becoming a platform for expressionist and modernist experiments. It also published numerous translations from foreign languages, especially of Catholic authors such as Paul Claudel, Georges Bernanos, Miguel de Unamuno, G. K. Chesterton and T. S. Eliot.

A major split in the journal took place in 1937, when the Christian Socialist author and thinker Edvard Kocbek published an essay entitled "Reflections on Spain" (Premišljevanja o Španiji), where he sharply criticized the role of Catholic high clergy in the Spanish Civil War, especially its support of the pro-Fascist uprising of the general Francisco Franco. The essay provoked a huge controversy in the Catholic public opinion in Slovenia, which ended in the resignation of the editor of the journal, France Koblar. Kocbek and his circle left Dom in svet, establishing a new journal, called Dejanje ("Action"). The scandal seriously damaged the reputation of the journal.

After the invasion of Yugoslavia and subsequent Italian occupation of Ljubljana in April 1941, Dom in svet was the only major Slovenian literary journal to continue publication. After the Nazi German occupation of the Province of Ljubljana in September 1943, it too ceased to be published.

All issues of the journal are freely available online on the Digital Library of Slovenia.

== Contributors ==
In addition to those already mentioned, other writers that contributed to Dom in svet included the historian Simon Rutar; the intellectual Bogdan Radica; the poets France Balantič, Miran Jarc, Joža Lovrenčič, Janez Remic, Anton Vodnik, Jože Udovič, and Božo Vodušek; the writers France Bevk, Fran Saleški Finžgar, Franc Ksaver Meško, and Ivan Pregelj; the playwrights France Kunstelj and Stanko Majcen; the literary critics Jakob Šolar and France Vodnik; the literary historians Tine Debeljak and Ivan Grafenauer; the theologian Aleš Ušeničnik; the political theorist Andrej Gosar; the politicians Janez Evangelist Krek and Evgen Lampe; the musician and essayist Marij Kogoj; the ethnologist Rajko Ložar; and the art historian Vojislav Mole.

== See also ==
- List of magazines in Slovenia
- Slovenian literature
