= Brdo pri Lukovici =

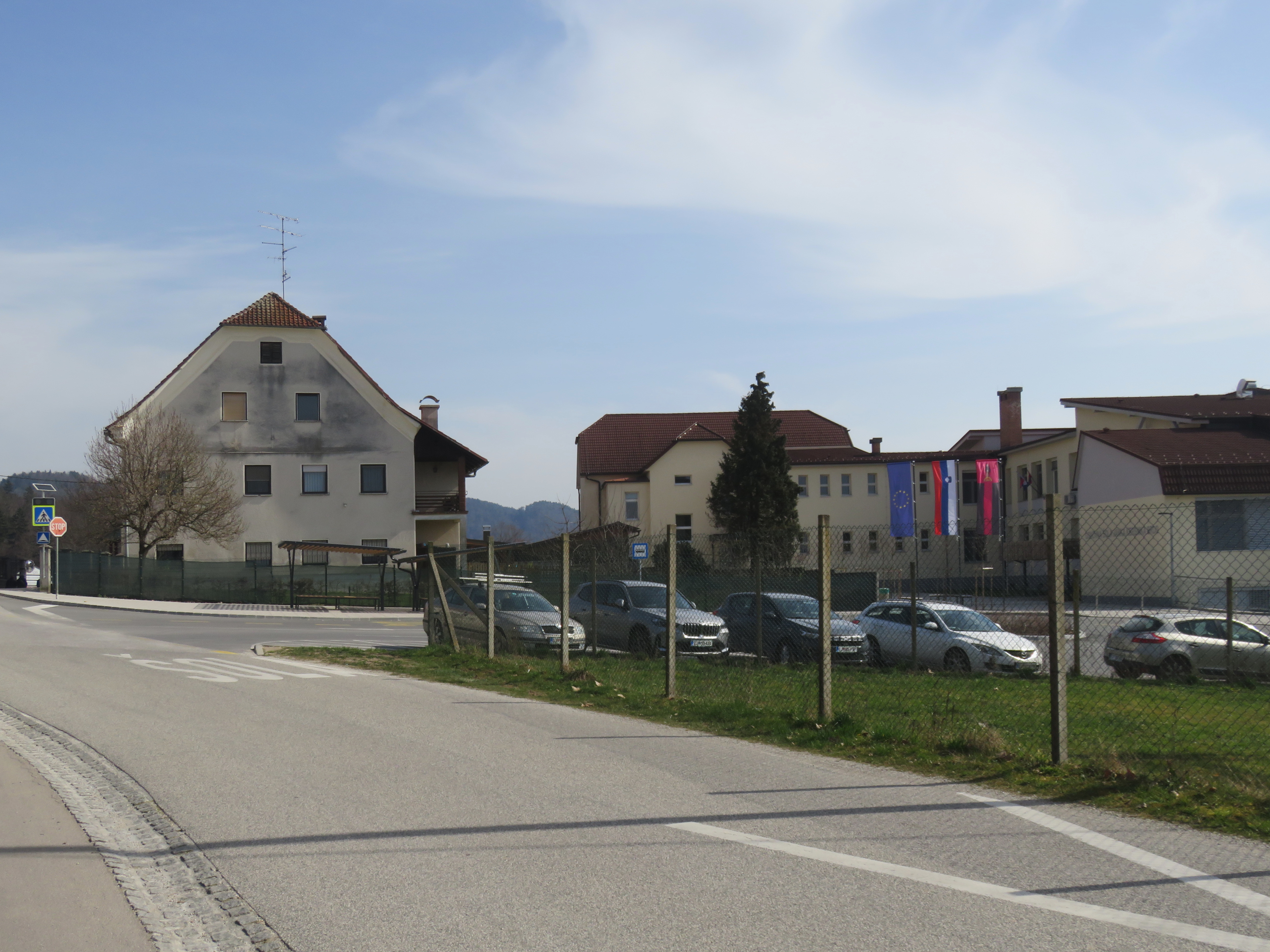

- Location in Slovenia
- Coordinates: 46°10′9.34″N 14°41′3.84″E
- Country: Slovenia
- Traditional region: Upper Carniola
- Statistical region: Central Slovenia
- Municipality: Lukovica

Area
  - Total: 1.58 km^{2} (0.61 sq mi)
- Elevation: 379.5 m (1,245 ft)

Population (2002)
  - Total: 5

Brdo pri Lukovici (pronounced [ˈbəɾdɔ pɾi ˈluːkɔʋitsi]; German: Egg) is a small settlement next to Lukovica pri Domžalah in the eastern part of the Upper Carniola region of Slovenia.

== Name ==
Brdo was first mentioned in written sources under the German name Ekk in 1340, and as Ekch in 1436 and Egk in 1473. The name of the settlement was changed from Brdo to Brdo pri Lukovici in 1953.

== Castle ==
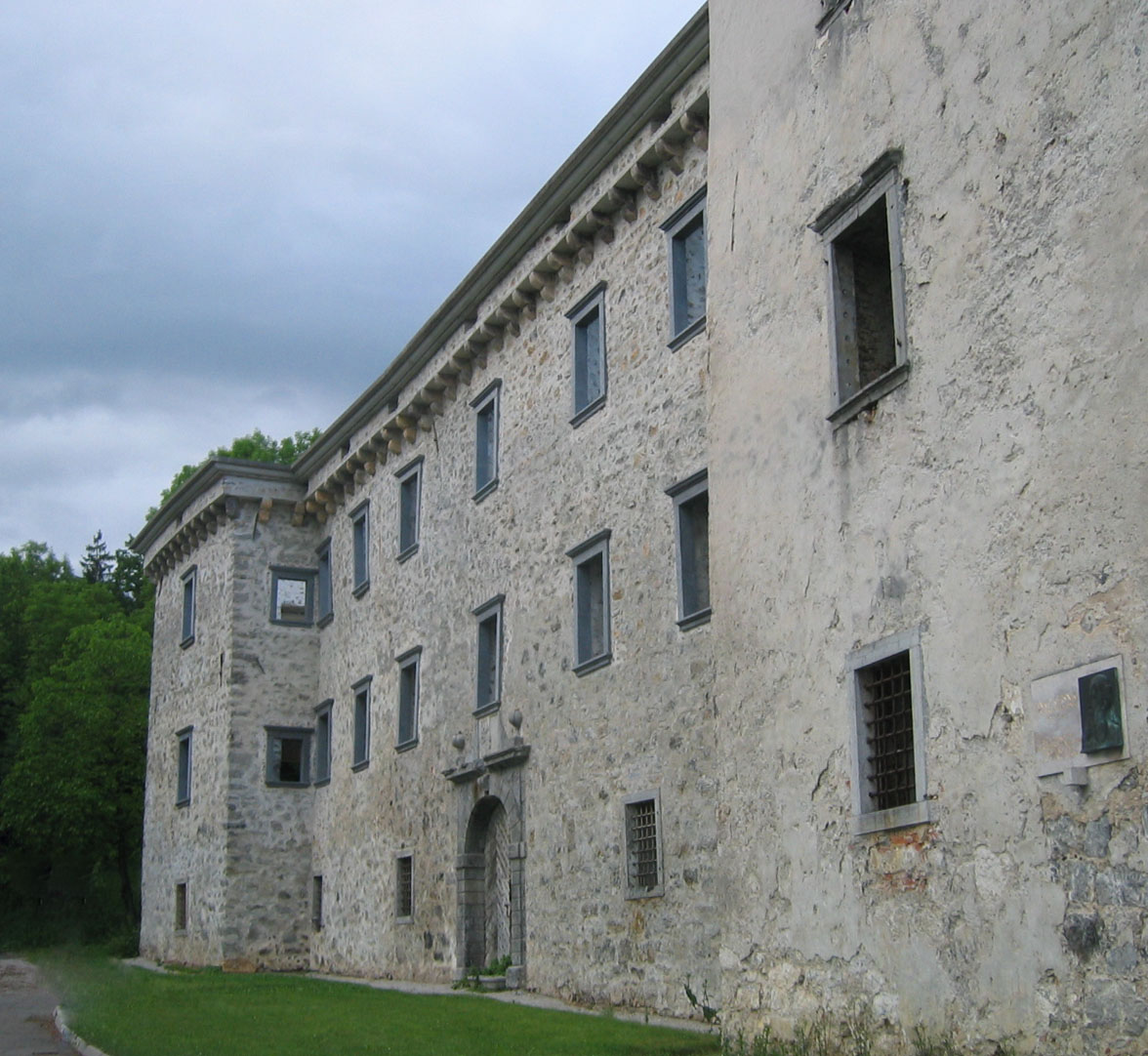
View from south

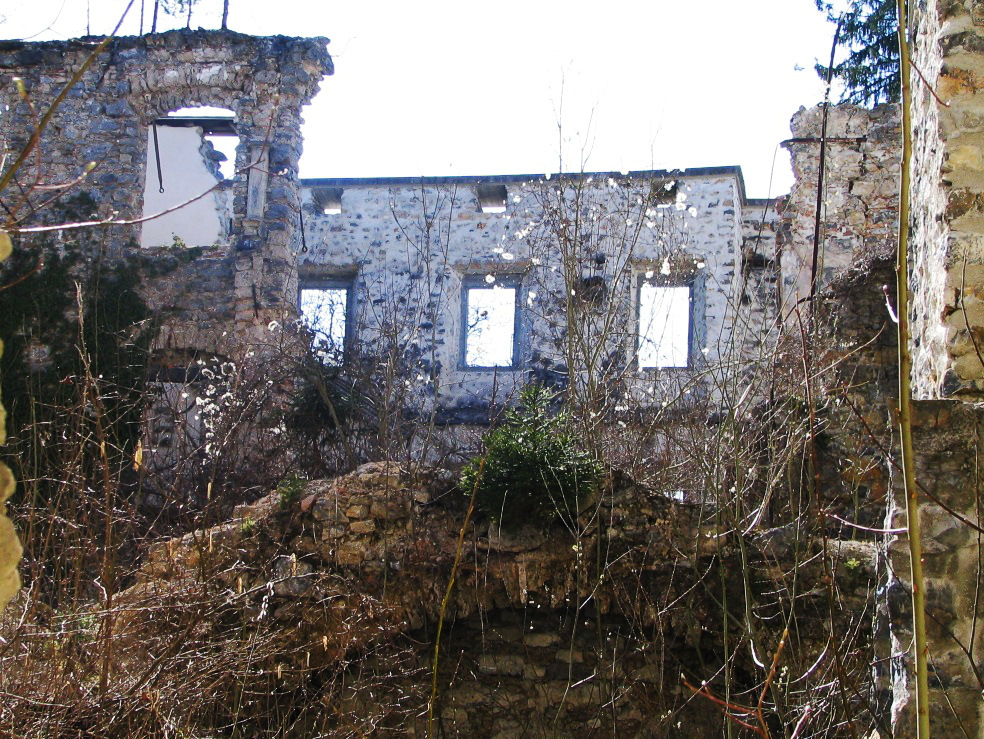
Castle interior

Brdo Castle

Brdo Castle (Slovene: Grad Brdo), also known as the Kersnik Manor (Kersnikova graščina), is located in the settlement. A castle was first mentioned at Brdo in the 15th century but was destroyed in the peasant uprising of 1515. The current structure is a 16th-century castle that was built by the Counts of Lamberg. A plaque above the entry is dated 1552 and bears the Lamberg coat of arms and a German inscription: "The noble Hans von Lamberg, owner of Črnelo and Mengeš, started building this castle, and then by God's will it was completed by his son Andreas von Lamberg of Črnelo and Jablje." Ownership of the castle changed several times in the 17th century. In 1622 the Lambergs pledged it to Anton Pečovič, and two years later to J. Jožef Taller. It was damaged in the peasant uprising of 1635. It was then inherited by J. Ludvik, Count of Hohenwart and subsequently sold to F. Ernest, Baron of Apfaltrer. The Apfaltrers owned the castle until the mid-18th century. After the death of the last Apfaltrer, the castle was inherited by F. Bernard, Count of Lamberg, and then by his son F. Adam. In 1803 his successor Janez Nepomuk sold the castle to Janez Burger. It was then inherited by his daughter Ivana Burger Höffern, who remained the owner until 1879. From 1867 until the Second World War it housed the local court (with offices on the second floor in the northern part), revenue offices, and prison (located in the cellar in the southern part).

The Slovene writer and politician Janko Kersnik was born at the castle in 1852 and was also its owner from 1883 until his death in 1897. Ownership then passed to Kersnik's mother Berta Höffern Kersnik, and then to his son Anton Kersnik in 1911. In 1941 the German authorities arrested inhabitants and sent them to Serbia, expropriated the castle and headquartered a German police and military unit in it.

The castle was burned down by the Partisans in 1943. After the end of the Second World War the authorities refused permission to its owners to restore the castle. The building was therefore left without a roof, and it rapidly began to deteriorate and only the exterior walls now remain. In 1994 a conservation program was adopted for the ruins. The current owner of the structure is Kersnik's grandson Franc Kersnik. On the southwest watchtower there is a relief with portrait of Janko Kersnik.

== Church ==
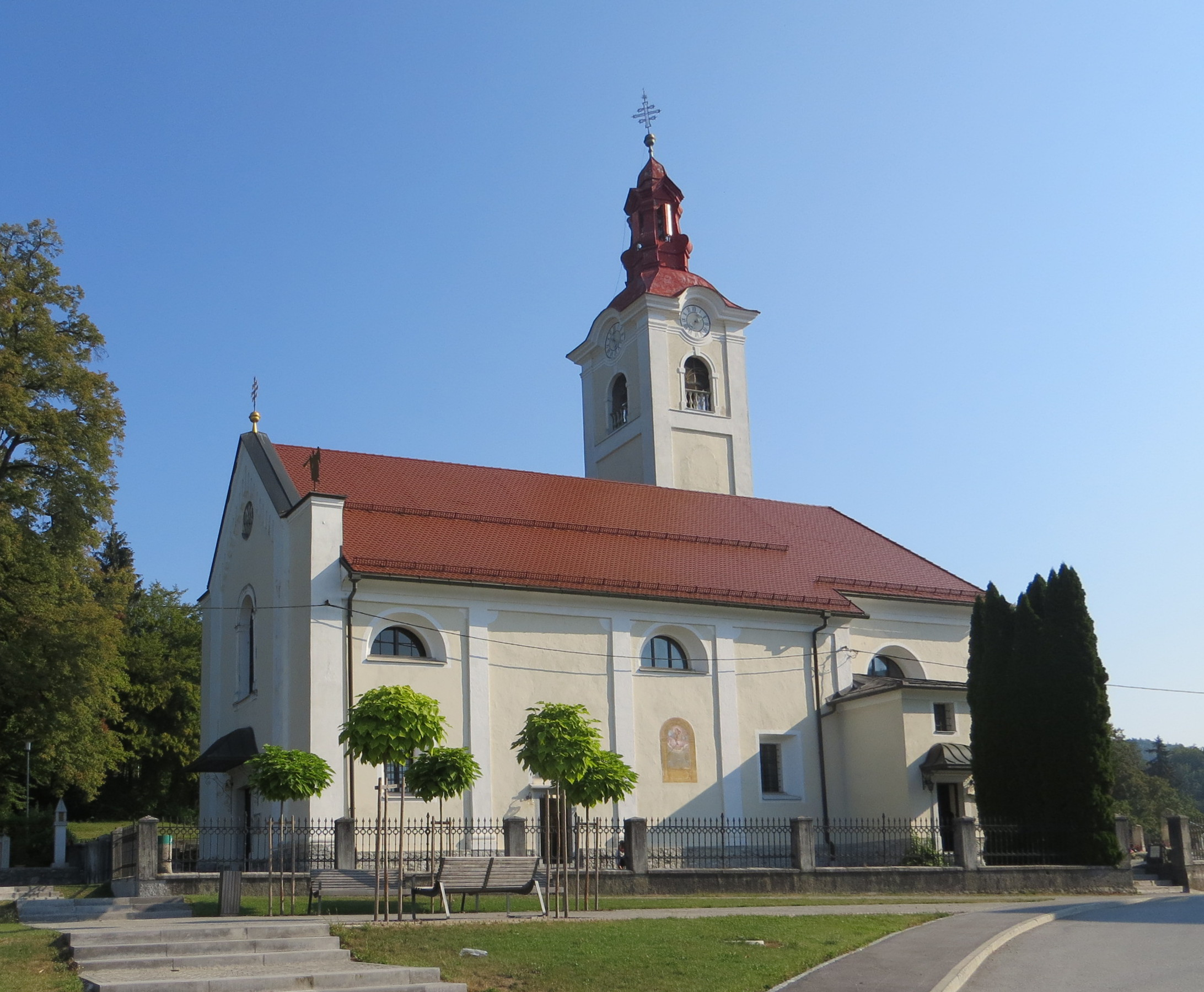
Assumption Church

The church in Brdo pri Lukovici is dedicated to the Assumption of Mary. It stands east of Brdo Castle and was built in 1718 at the site of the previous castle chapel. It was reworked in 1753 and 1883, and it features paintings by Anton Werle from c. 1755.
