= Janko Kersnik =

Slovene writer and politician

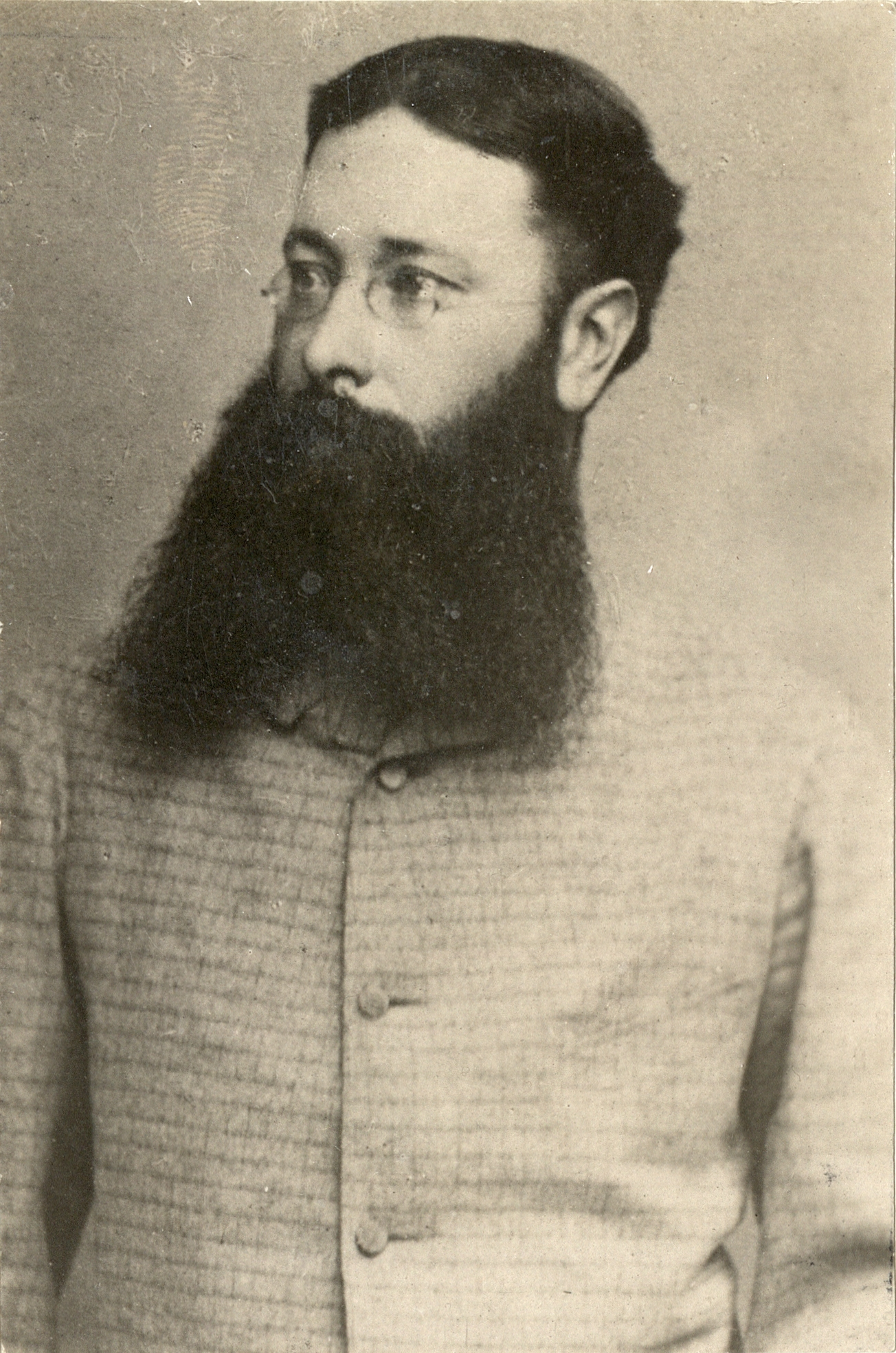
- Janko Kersnik
- Born: 4 September 1852; Brdo, Slovenia
- Died: 28 July 1897 (aged 44); Ljubljana, Slovenia
- Occupation: Politician

Janko Kersnik (4 September 1852 – 28 July 1897) was a writer and politician from Austria-Hungary who was an ethnic Slovene. Together with Josip Jurčič, he is considered the most important representative of literary realism in the Slovene language.

== Biography ==
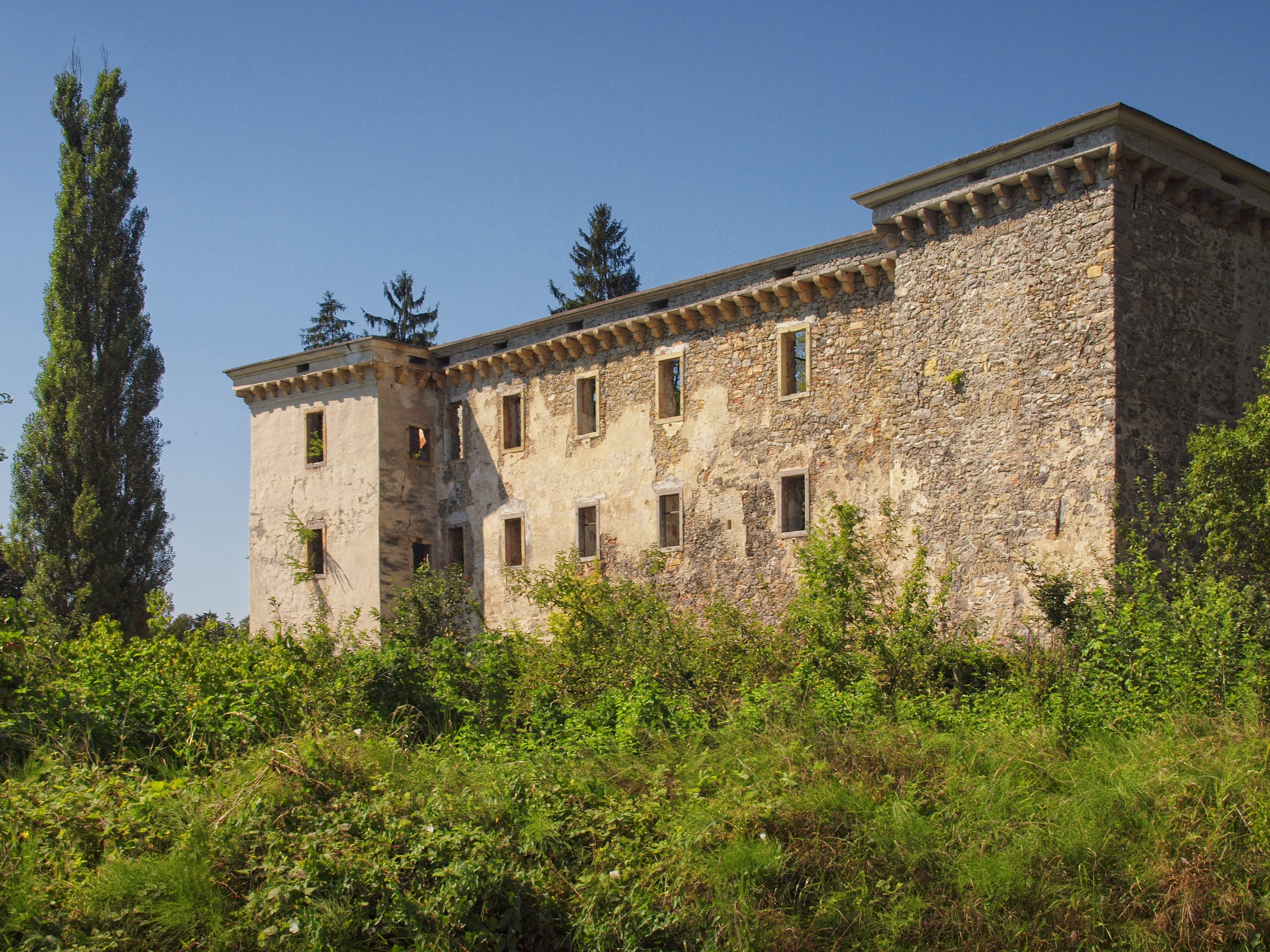
Ruins of Brdo Manor

Kersnik was born in Brdo Manor near Lukovica in Upper Carniola, then part of the Austrian Duchy of Carniola (now in Slovenia). His father Jože Kersnik was a district judge, while his mother Berta Höffern was a local noblewoman. Kersnik grew up in a bilingual, German-Slovene environment. He attended the German-language grammar school in Ljubljana, but was expelled under accusations of Slovene nationalism. He continued his studies under the private tutorship of Fran Levec, an influential Young Slovene literary historian.

He studied law at the University of Vienna and Graz, where he graduated in 1874. He worked in the Austro-Hungarian administration in Ljubljana between 1874 and 1878, where he opened a civil law notary office in his native Brdo pri Lukovici.

In the late 1870s, he became active in politics in the liberal Young Slovene party. In 1883, he was elected to the Carniolan provincial diet. Together with Fran Šuklje, He belonged to the moderate faction of the Slovene Liberals, and opposed both the conservatism of the Old Slovenes, the centralism of Austrian liberals, and the Slovene radical national liberalism, advocated by Ivan Hribar and Ivan Tavčar.

He died in Ljubljana in 1897.

== Literary work ==
Kersnik started his literary career as a German-language poet. Under the influence of Slovene post-Romantic authors Josip Stritar and Simon Jenko, he began writing in Slovene. He first wrote in late Romantic style, but under the influence of his personal friend Josip Jurčič, he switched to literary realism. He was a prolific author of short stories, feuilletons, and satires, in which he critically assessed the backwardness of the Slovene Lands of his time, and the radicalization of political life.

== Bibliography ==
- Na Žerinjah, 1876 COBISS 62961664
- Rokovnjači – finished after death of Josipa Jurčiča, 1881 COBISS 30308865
- Lutrski ljudje, 1882 COBISS 63837696
- Ciklamen, 1883 COBISS 34961408
- Gospod Janez, 1884 COBISS 75632128
- Agitator, 1885 COBISS 215794944
- Mačkova očeta, 1886
- Testament, 1887 COBISS 37458176
- Dohtar Konec in njegov konj, 1888 COBISS 3350275
- Kako je stari Molek tatu iskal, 1889 COBISS 3350275
- Kmetske slike, 1891 COBISS 117854464
- Jara gospoda, 1893 COBISS 228680448
- Očetov greh, 1894 COBISS 26886145

== Sources ==
- Biographical entry in the Slovenian Biographical Lexicon: Kersnik, Janko
