= Velika Štanga =

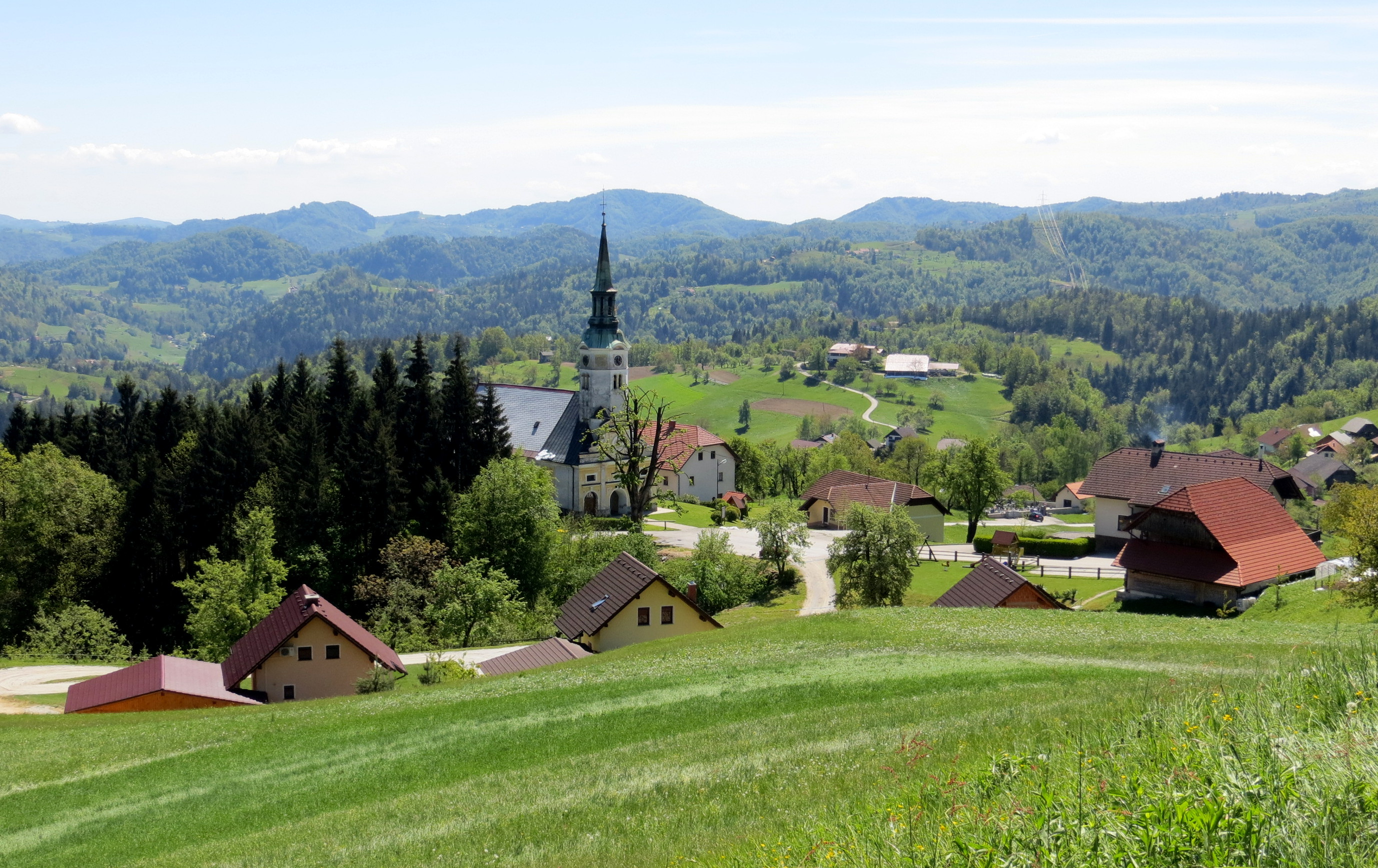

- Location in Slovenia
- Coordinates: 46°2′53.74″N 14°45′45.47″E
- Country: Slovenia
- Traditional region: Lower Carniola
- Statistical region: Central Slovenia
- Municipality: Šmartno pri Litiji

Area
  - Total: 2.87 km^{2} (1.11 sq mi)
- Elevation: 515.8 m (1,692 ft)

Population (2002)
  - Total: 94

Velika Štanga (pronounced [ˈʋeːlika ˈʃtaːŋɡa]; in older sources also Sveti Anton, German: St. Anton; also German: Stangenwald, Stangen) is a settlement in the hills west of Šmartno pri Litiji in central Slovenia. The area is part of the historical region of Lower Carniola. The Municipality of Šmartno pri Litiji is now included in the Central Slovenia Statistical Region.

== Church ==
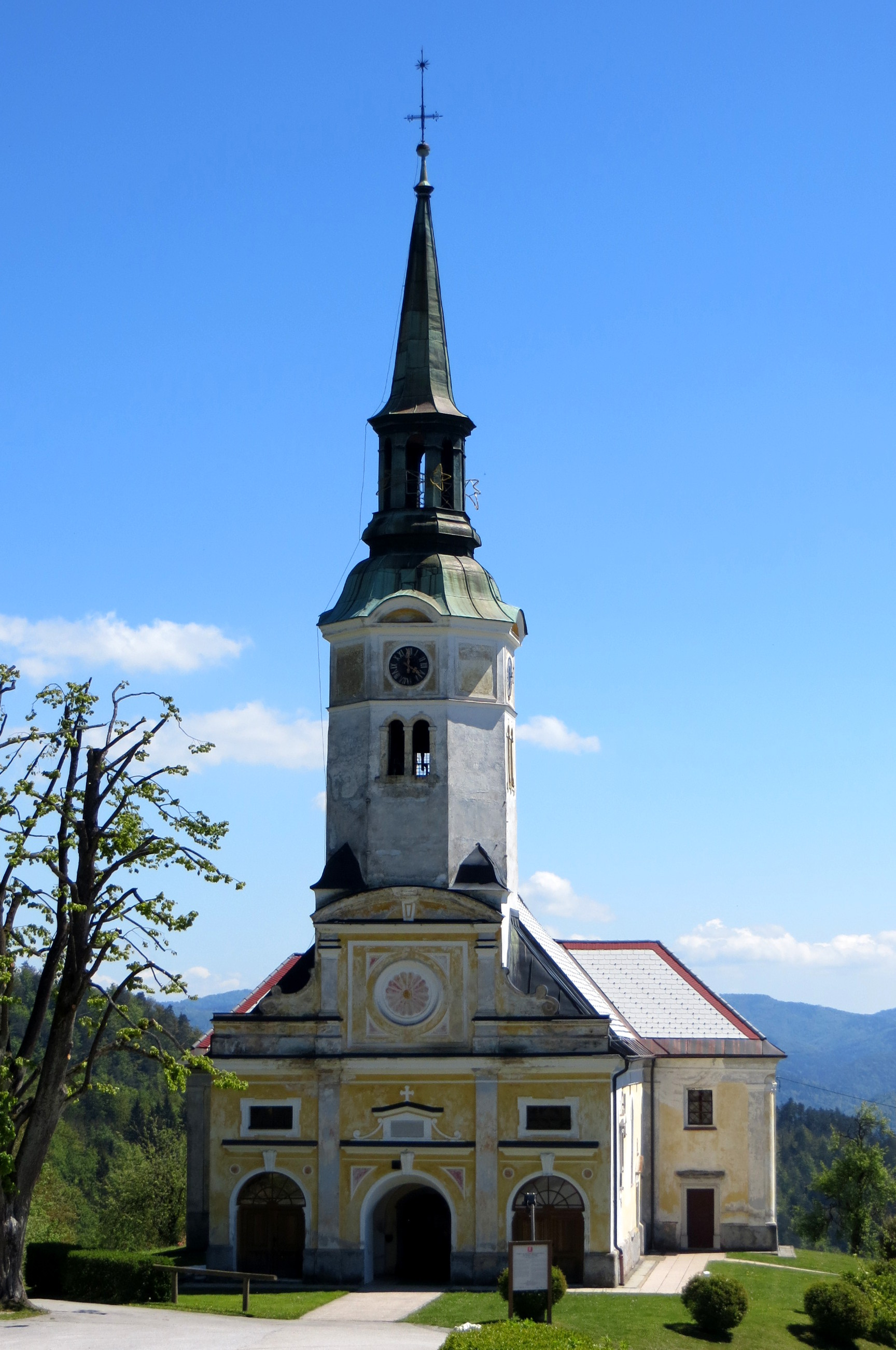
Saint Anthony of Padua Church

The Štanga parish church in the settlement is dedicated to Saint Anthony of Padua and belongs to the Roman Catholic Archdiocese of Ljubljana. It dates to 1677 with some major remodelling and rebuilding carried out in 1894.
