= Ljubljanski zvon =

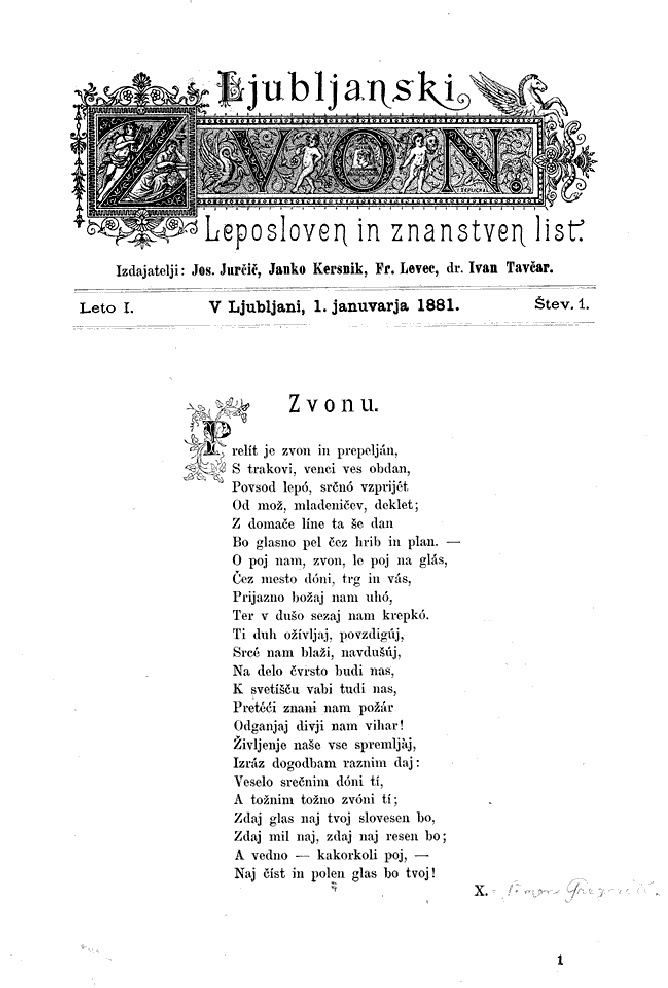
The first issue of the magazine Ljubljanski zvon, 1881, with a poem by Simon Gregorčič.

Ljubljanski zvon (The Ljubljana Bell) was a journal published in Ljubljana in Slovene between 1881 and 1941. It was considered one of the most prestigious literary and cultural magazines in Slovenia.

== Early period ==
The journal was founded in 1881 as a gazette of the circle of young Slovene liberals, mostly from Carniola, who were dissatisfied with the editorial policy of the magazine Zvon (The Bell), published in Vienna by the doyen of the Young Slovenes movement, Josip Stritar. The group, centered around the authors, journalists and political activists Josip Jurčič, Janko Kersnik, Ivan Tavčar, and Fran Levec, regarded Stritar's editorial policy as too detached from the reality in the Slovene Lands. They also rejected Stritar's post-romantic aesthetic views, which they saw as backward and too influenced by Schopenhauer's pessimism. Instead, they turned to realism and later to naturalism.

Soon after its establishment, Ljubljanski zvon became the most prestigious literary magazine in Slovene. From the turn of the 20th century onward, it became also a platform for political and public debates. Since its formation, it supported liberal and progressive views. In 1888, conservative Roman Catholic intellectuals founded the magazine Dom in svet to counter the influence of Ljubljanski zvon. From then on, the competition between the two journals became one of the characteristic of the Slovene cultural and public life.

== The split over Yugoslav nation building ==
During the centralist regime of King Alexander I of Yugoslavia, the editorial board of the journal suffered a decisive split between a minority who supported the project of creating a unitary Yugoslav nation, and a majority of those who clang to the specific national and cultural identity of the Slovene people. The first serious conflict broke out in 1931, when the chief editor Fran Albreht decided to commemorate the 50th anniversary of the founding of the magazine by adding a new subtitle: Slovenska revija (Slovene magazine). The decision was made in period when the Yugoslav authorities were sponsoring the official use of Serbo-Croatian in the Drava Banovina and when even the name "Slovenia" was banned from official public use.

The following year, a polemics broke out between the poet Oton Župančič and the literary critic Josip Vidmar on the issue of Slovene identity. Župančič published an essay on the occasion of the visit of the Slovene-born American writer Louis Adamic in the Kingdom of Yugoslavia, in which he maintained that the Slovenes shouldn't be too preoccupied about their language, since they can keep their identity even if they lose the language. The article was perceived by many as a subtle support of the cultural policies of the centralist monarchist regime. When the literary critic Josip Vidmar wanted to publish his negative review of Župančič's article in the journal, he was prevented of doing so by the publisher, closely linked to the National-Liberal political establishment which supported King Alexander's dictatorship. In protest, most of the editorial board stepped down, including the chief editor Fran Albreht. In the same year, Albreht published a book entitled Kriza Ljubljanskega Zvona (The Crisis of The Ljubljana Bell), in which he made public all the details of the controversy. The book greatly damaged the reputation of the magazine. In 1933, the younger generations of Slovene liberal intellectuals that rejected Yugoslav nation building founded a new journal, called Sodobnost, with Albreht as editor.

The split of 1932-33 ruined the reputation of the magazine. Many of the most talented writers went to Sodobnost and the Ljubljanski zvon lost a substantial number of subscribers. In 1935, the writer and journalist Juš Kozak was chosen as the new editor. He opened the journal to Marxist and Communist authors, which published their articles under pseudonyms (among them was also the young Dušan Pirjevec, who later became one of the foremost Marxist intellectuals in Slovenia). After the Axis invasion of Yugoslavia in April 1941, the journal was closed down by the Italian occupation authorities of the Province of Ljubljana. After the end of World War II in 1945, the new Communist authorities did not allow the re-establishment of the journal, despite the pro-Marxist inclination of its last editorial board.

== Importance ==
The editors of Ljubljanski zvon included figures such as Fran Levec, Anton Funtek, Janko Kersnik, Anton Aškerc, Oton Župančič, Anton Melik, Fran Albreht, Anton Ocvirk, Tone Seliškar and Juš Kozak. Many of the most important Slovene authors of the period published their works in the journal, including Dragotin Kette, Josip Murn, Ivan Cankar and Alojz Gradnik. The journal published also articles in the field of humanities and social sciences, both from Slovene and non-Slovene authors.

== Availability ==
All issues of the journal can be freely accessed online on the Digital Library of Slovenia.

== See also ==
- List of magazines in Slovenia
