= Josip Stritar =

Slovene writer

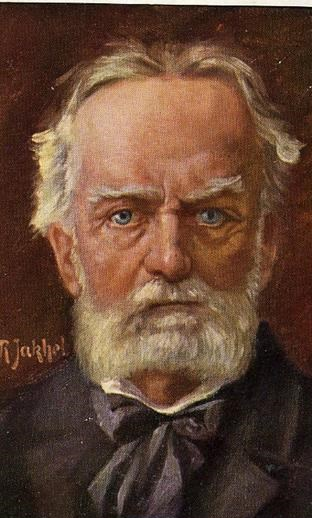
- Stritar, 1920s painting
- Born: 6 March 1836; Podsmreka, Austrian Empire (now Slovenia)
- Died: 25 November 1923 (aged 87); Rogaška Slatina, Kingdom of Serbs, Croats and Slovenes (now Slovenia)
- Occupations: Writer; poet; playwright
- Writing career
- Notable works: Zorin, Gospod Mirodolski, Rosana, Sodnikovi

Josip Stritar (6 March 1836 – 25 November 1923) was a Slovene writer, poet, essayist, the first aesthetic critic, playwright, publisher and translator.

== Life ==
Stritar spent his early childhood in his home village of Podsmreka in rural Lower Carniola and was sent to school in Ljubljana. His parents was Andrej Stritar and Uršula Jakič. In 1855, he went to study in Vienna and completed his studies in 1874, after which he became an assistant teacher at the Hernals Gymnasium, and after 1878, professor in Josefstadt, where he remained until his retirement in 1901. Stritar returned to the Slovene Lands in January 1923, after he was in recognition of his work given a house in Rogaška Slatina by the regional government in Ljubljana. He lived there until his death and was buried in Ljubljana.

== Work ==
One of his important contributions was the introduction to the 1866 edition of France Prešeren's collected poems where he pointed out the importance of his poems to the nascent Slovene national identity. In the 1880s and 1890s he translated much of the Bible into Slovenian which was published by the British and Foreign Bible Society.

Despite living most of his life in Vienna, he was much admired and appreciated at home even during his lifetime and was made an honorary member of the Yugoslav Academy of Sciences and Arts in 1919.

== Commemoration ==
The main street leading from the Triple Bridge towards Town Square in Ljubljana has been named Stritarjeva ulica (Stritar Street) after Stritar. Stritar's birth house has been replaced with another building; from his period, only a granary has been preserved. It has been arranged into an ethnographic museum.

== Bibliography ==
Books

- Klasje – introduction to the issue of Prešeren's Collected Poems (1866)
- Svetinova Metka, ("The Svetin's Girl, Metka"; 1868)
- Pesmi ("Poems"; 1869)
- Pasji pogovori ("Canine Conversations"; 1870)
- Zorin (1870)
- Dunajski soneti ("Viennese Sonnets"; 1872)
- Prešernova pisma iz Elizije ("Prešeren's Letters from Elysium"; 1872)
- Gospod Mirodolski ("The Master of Mirodol"; 1876)
- Rosana (1877)
- Sódnikovi ("The Sodnik Family"; 1878)

Plays

- Orest ("Orestes"; 1866 or 1867)
- Medeja ("Medea"; 1870)
- Regulovo slovo ("The Farewell of Regulus"; 1870)
- Najemnina ("The Rent"; 1876)
- Oderuh ("The Usurer"; 1876)
- Rejenka ("The Foster Daughter"; 1876)
- Zapravljivec ("The Spendthrift"; 1876)
- Zorko (1877)
- Klara (1880)
- Po velikem požaru; Slike iz življenja dunajskega ("After the Great Fire; Scenes from Viennese Life"; 1882)
- Nedolžen! ("Innocent!" 1883)
- Pravo junaštvo ("True Heroism"; 1885)
- Logarjevi ("The Logar Family"; 1899)

Youth literature

- Pod lipo ("Under the Linden Tree"; 1895)
- Jagode ("The Strawberries"; 1899)
- Zimski večeri ("Winter Evenings"; 1902)
- Lešniki ("Hazelnuts"; 1906)

Bible Translation

- Novi Testament (New Testament; 1881, together with Francè Remec and Matija Valjavec)
- Psalmi Davidovi (Psalms; 1881)
- Pregovori (Proverbs; 1883)
- Prva knjiga Mojzesova (Genesis; 1885)
- Izaija (Isaiah; 1889)
- Jeremija (Jeremiah; 1898)
- Žalostne pesmi Jeremija preroka (Lamentations; 1898)
