= Fabiani Bridge =

- Coordinates: 46°03′01″N 14°31′09″E
- Crosses: Ljubljanica River
- Locale: Ljubljana, Slovenia

Characteristics
- Design: Jurij Kobe
- Total length: 150 m

History
- Opened: 22 August 2012

Location
- Interactive map of Fabiani Bridge

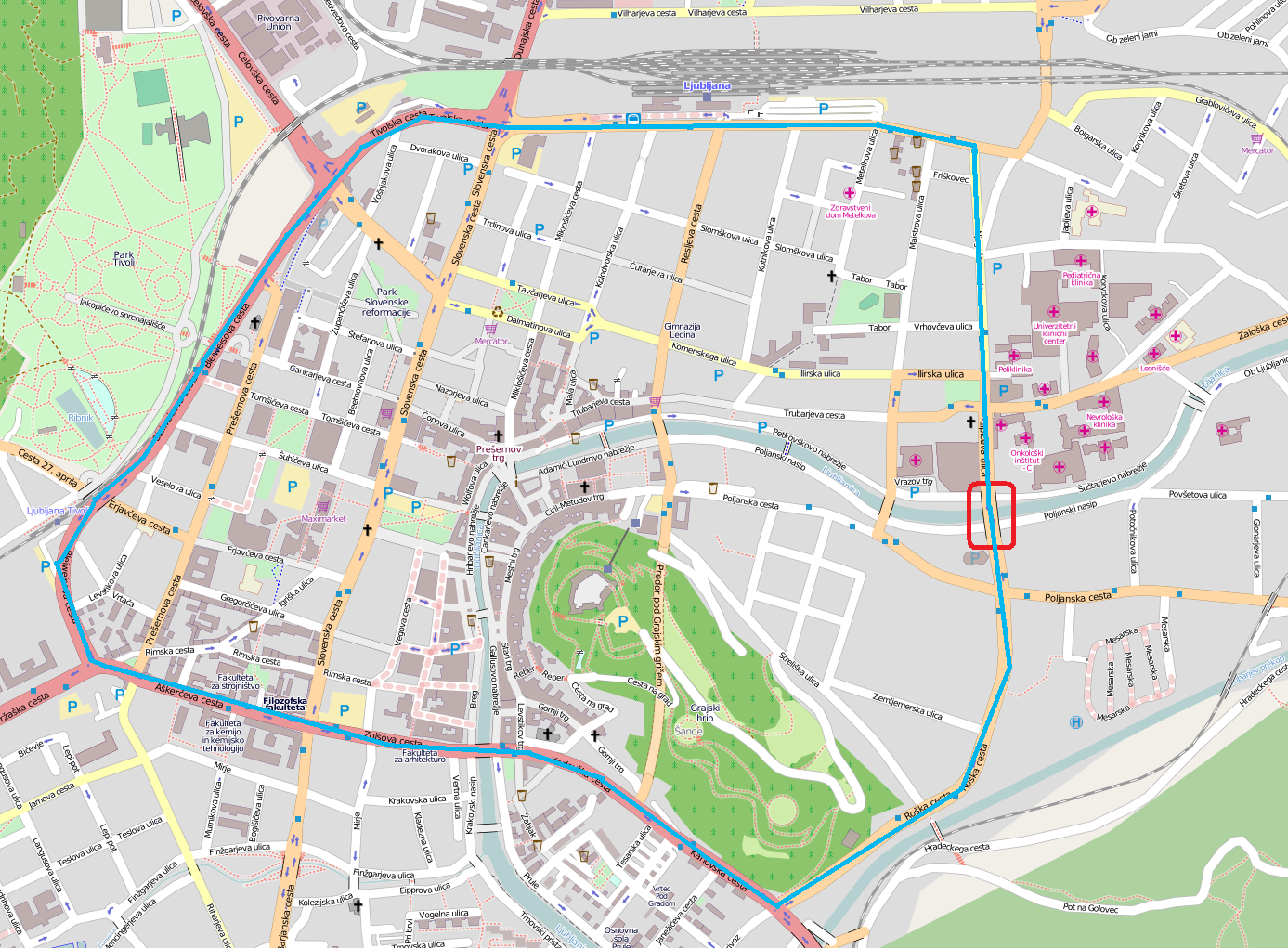
Location of the Fabiani Bridge marked on a map of central Ljubljana (red square) and Ljubljana's inner ring roads (blue)

The Fabiani Bridge (Slovene: Fabianijev most) is a two-level bridge over the Ljubljanica River in Ljubljana, the capital of Slovenia. It links Njegoš Street (Njegoševa cesta) with Rog Street (Roška cesta) and thus completes the Ljubljana's inner ring road. The bridge has been named after its original conceptor Max Fabiani (1865–1962) and was opened to the public on 22 August 2012. The architect in charge of the design was Jurij Kobe.

On 23 August in the morning, a day after the opening of the bridge, a severe balloon accident happened at the Ljubljana Marsh, several kilometres away. The Fabiani Bridge significantly shortened the pathway of ambulances driving the injured from the site of accident to the Ljubljana University Medical Centre, located in the vicinity of the bridge.

Planning and realization of the bridge have been criticized since the beginning of its planning because it disadvantages cyclists and pedestrians who are not allowed to use the upper part of the bridge, which links Njegoš Street and Rog Street directly, and are confined to using the lower level, which connects to Rog Street via a set of inclined sidepaths on the Šuštar Embankment.
