= Lindstrand Balloons =

Hot Air Balloon Manufacturer

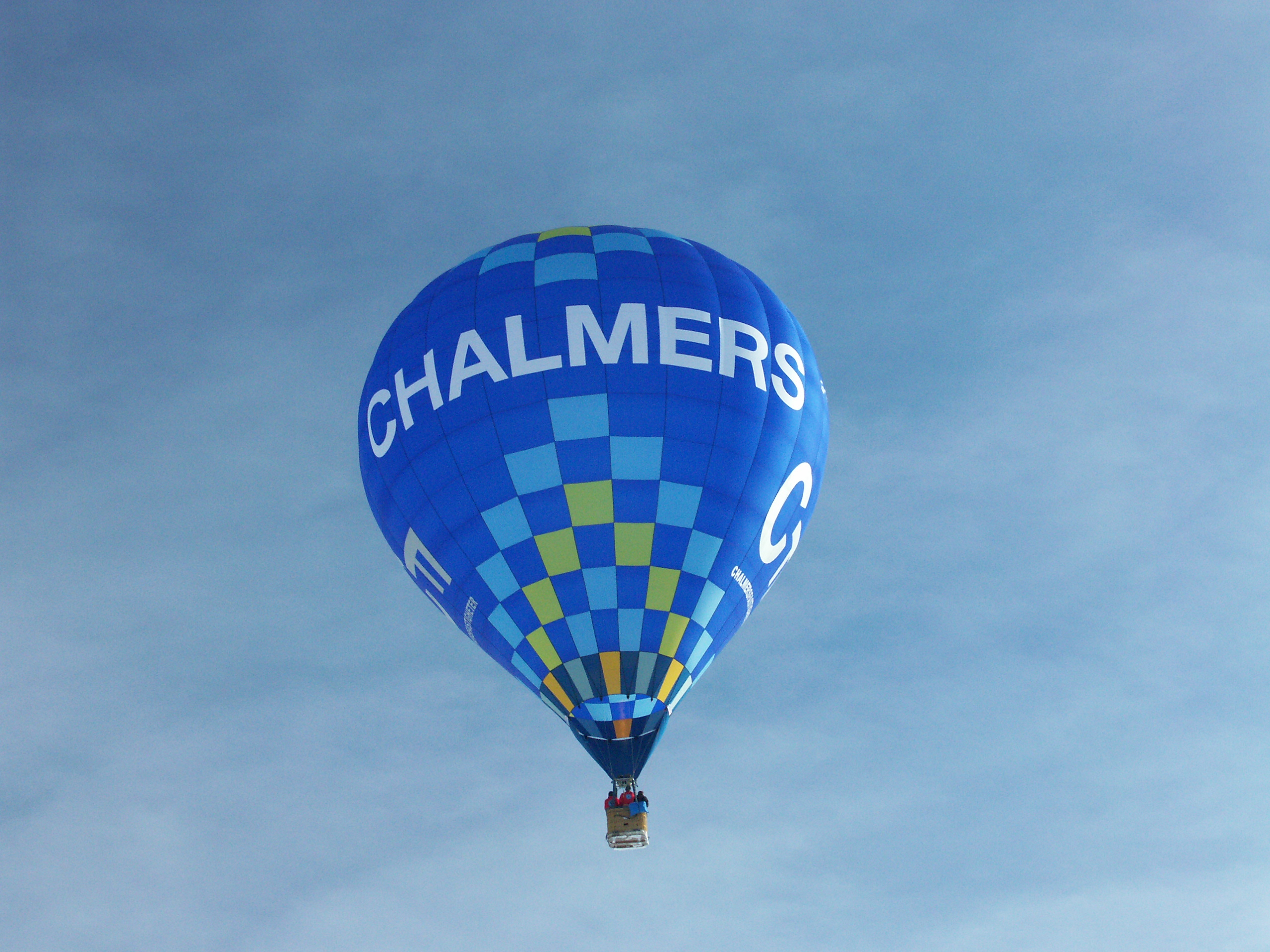
Linstrand Z90

Lindstrand Balloons was a manufacturer of hot air balloons and other aerostats. The company was started by Swedish-born pilot and aeronautical designer Per Lindstrand in Oswestry, England, as Colt Balloons (later Thunder & Colt Balloons, then Lindstrand Balloons) in 1978. Lindstrand Balloons was known for its leading-edge engineering, which included sophisticated testing and production facilities.

Lindstrand Balloons designed and built the hot air balloons flown by Per Lindstrand and Richard Branson on their record breaking flights; first across the Atlantic Ocean in 1987 and then the Pacific Ocean in 1990. Subsequently Lindstrand designed and built three Rozière balloons which Per Lindstrand and Branson and others used in their unsuccessful attempts to circumnavigate the Earth by balloon. Per Lindstrand played an instrumental role in making these flights possible, and was pilot for all of them.

== Ownership structure ==
In the late-1990s, Cameron Holdings and its owner Don Cameron acquired two-thirds ownership of Lindstrand Balloons. Cameron bought the majority stake in Lindstrand Balloons from Rory McCarthy, a British industrialist associated with Richard Branson, who had invested in Lindstrand to support Branson's series of record-setting balloon flights. The remaining third of the company was owned by its founder Per Lindstrand, until 2003 when Per sold his remaining share to Cameron Holdings.

Despite Cameron's ownership, Lindstrand Balloons continued to operate as an independent company with separate management and its own distinct designs and products.

Per Lindstrand independently operates a separate company, Lindstrand Technologies, which designs and builds gas balloons, innovative buildings, specialized aerospace equipment (including an advanced parachute for the Beagle 2 Mars-lander) and cutting edge inflatable structures including aircraft hangars, plugs for fire-containment for road tunnels and flood prevention systems.

On 15 April 2015 it was reported that Lindstrand Balloons had closed, with 19 workers losing their jobs, citing the strength of the pound and terrorism threats in the Middle East as factors in the slow sales of balloons.

== See also ==
- 2012 Ljubljana Marshes hot air balloon crash
- hot air balloon
- hopper balloon
- Rozière balloon
