= Firefly Balloons =

American hot air balloon manufacturer

FireFly Balloons
- Company type: Private company
- Industry: Aerospace
- Founded: 1972
- Headquarters: Statesville, North Carolina, United States
- Key people: Tracy Barnes (founder)
- Products: Hot air balloons
- Website: www.fireflyballoons.net

A FireFly 7 Balloon of 77,000 Cu Ft

FireFly Balloons is an American hot air balloon manufacturer that started as Barnes Balloons in 1972 in Statesville, NC. The company is one of the oldest hot air balloon manufacturers in the United States, behind Raven Industries (founded by Ed Yost), SEMCO and Piccard Balloons. The origins of the company's designs can be traced to the work of Tracy Barnes in the late 1960s.

== Design and development ==
Tracy Barnes' designs introduced many of the features found in modern hot air balloons.

The parachute top, which replaced spring tops, explosive tops and inverting envelopes used previously, did much to improve the safety and maneuverability of balloons. Additionally, the T-3 burner offered a modern and high-powered burner with redundant capability in the event of a primary burner failure, in the form of the "Fire 2" jet.

Barnes introduced the distinctive zig-zag envelope to reduce fabric waste and the use of glossy, heat resistant polyester instead of nylon for envelopes. This material choice resulted in a higher maximum envelope temperature of 300 degrees Fahrenheit. Barnes also designed a distinctive triangular basket to offer increased volume, tipping resistance and corner stowage of three fuel tanks. Barnes' most significant contribution was in drastically simplifying venting and deflation by inventing the parachute top. Later Barnes would invent the FlexNet Envelope, which prevented the possibility of envelope tears growing beyond a single panel. The type certificates issued to The Balloon Works are still the basis of the popular line of balloons produced by FireFly Balloons. Often, early balloons manufactured by the company are referred to as "Barnes" balloons, however this was never the actual company name. The company's name from 2000 on has been FireFly Balloons.

Tracy Barnes is no longer directly involved with FireFly, instead he presently works on unmanned and advertising blimps through his company The Blimp Works.

Among the characteristic design features of FireFly balloons are:

- Triangular baskets
- Zig-zag (or chevron) patterned envelope gores
- Toggle and loop envelope fasteners
- maXflite silicone coated rip-stop Nylon is now used in envelopes, Polyester was used in older systems.
- Bulbous gores

The open Parachute Top in a FireFly 7 Balloon as viewed during deflation
