= Hot air balloon =

Lighter-than-air aircraft

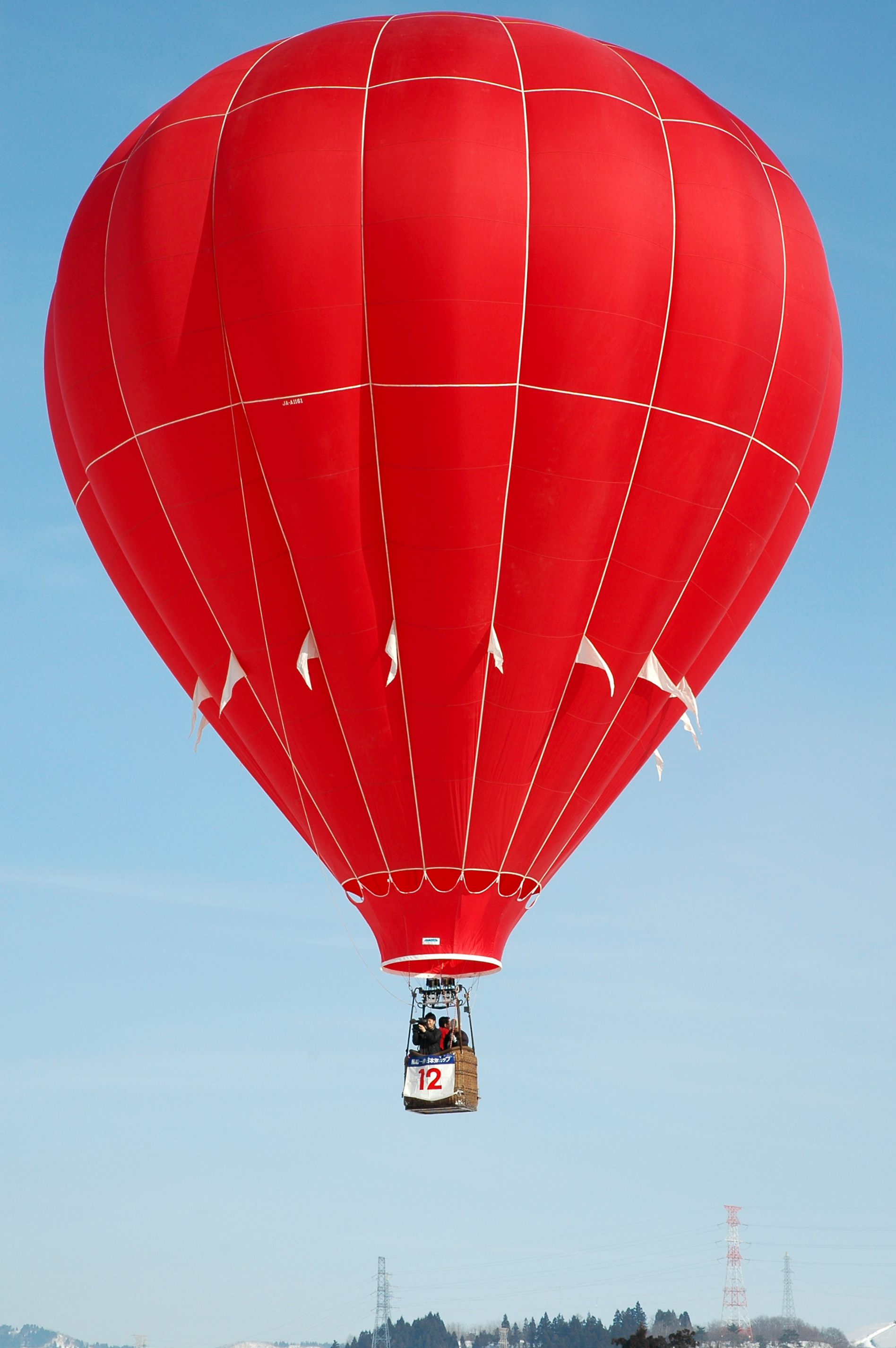
Hot air balloon in flight

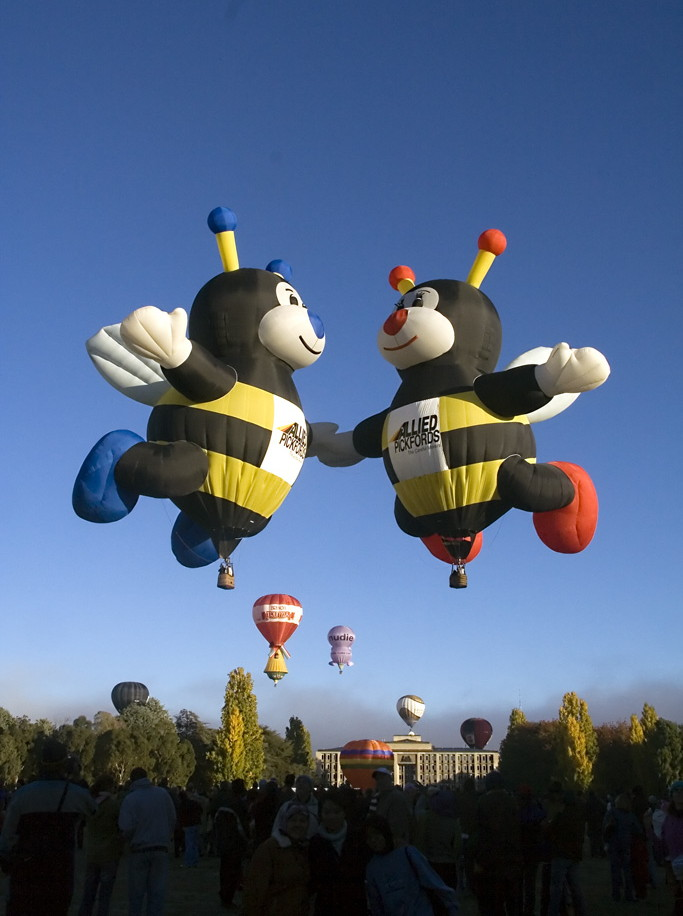
Novelty hot air balloons resembling anthropomorphized bees

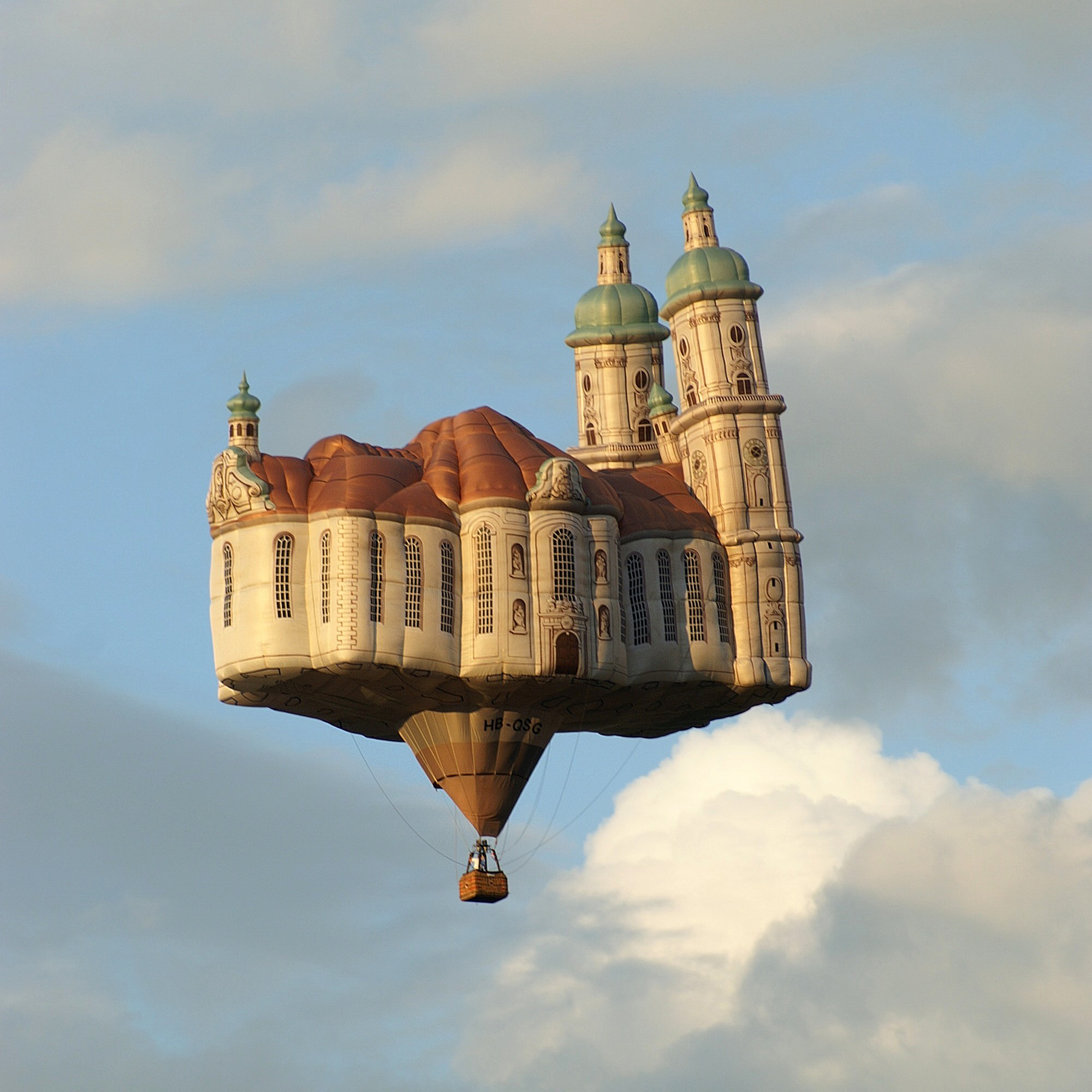
Novelty hot air balloon resembling the Abbey of Saint Gall

A hot air balloon is a lighter-than-air aircraft consisting of a bag, called an envelope, which contains heated air. Suspended beneath is a gondola or wicker basket (in some long-distance or high-altitude balloons, a capsule), which carries passengers and a source of heat, in most cases an open flame caused by burning liquid propane. The heated air inside the envelope makes it buoyant, since it has a lower density than the colder air outside the envelope. As with all aircraft, hot air balloons cannot fly beyond the atmosphere. The envelope does not have to be sealed at the bottom, since the air inside the envelope is at about the same pressure as the surrounding air. In modern sport balloons the envelope is generally made from nylon fabric, and the inlet of the balloon (closest to the burner flame) is made from a fire-resistant material such as Nomex. Modern balloons have been made in many shapes, such as rocket ships and the shapes of various commercial products, though the traditional shape is used for most non-commercial and many commercial applications.

The hot air balloon is the first successful human-carrying flight technology. The first untethered manned hot air balloon flight in the world was performed in Paris, France, by Jean-François Pilâtre de Rozier and François Laurent d'Arlandes on November 21, 1783, in a balloon created by the Montgolfier brothers. Hot air balloons that can be propelled through the air rather than simply drifting with the wind are known as thermal airships.

== History ==
=== Premodern and unmanned balloons ===
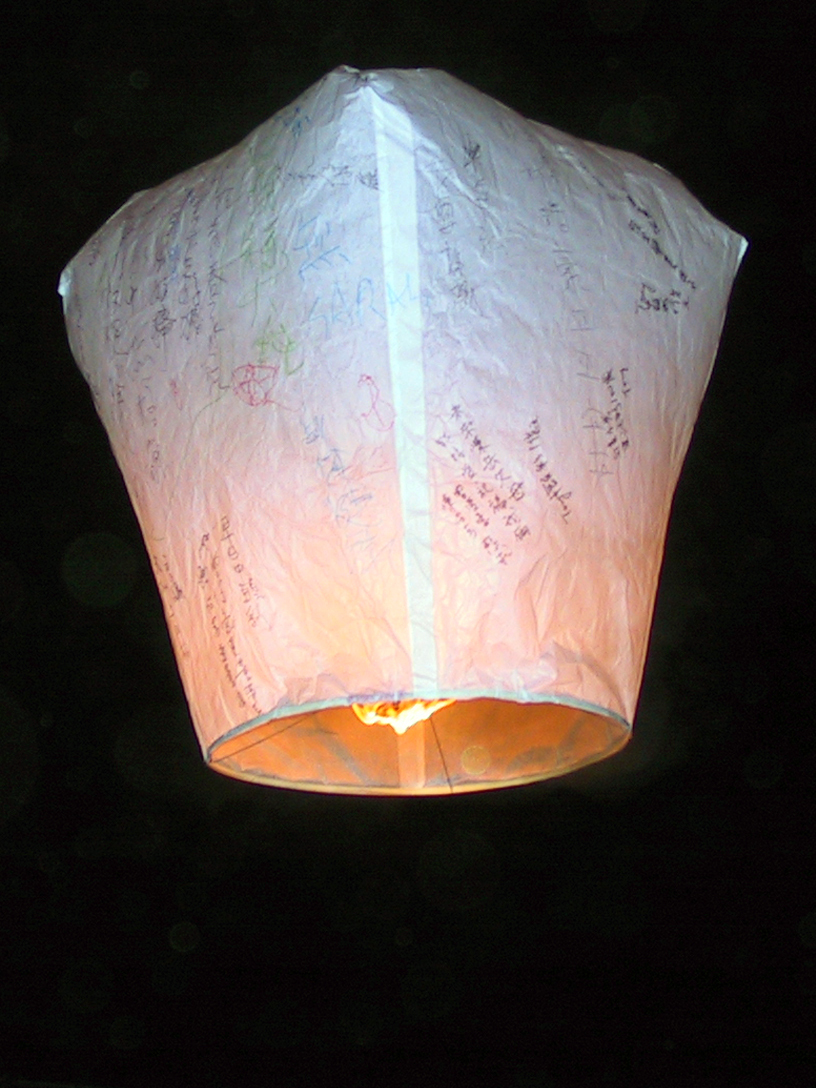
A sky lantern

A precursor of the hot air balloon was the sky lantern (simplified Chinese: 孔明灯; traditional Chinese: 孔明燈). Zhuge Liang of the Shu Han kingdom, during the Three Kingdoms era (220–280 CE), used these airborne lanterns for military signaling. The Mongolian army studied Kongming lanterns from China and used them in the Battle of Legnica during the Mongol invasion of Poland in the 13th century. This is the first time ballooning was known in the western world.

In the 18th century the Portuguese Jesuit priest Bartolomeu de Gusmão in colonial Brazil envisioned an aerial apparatus named Passarola, which was the predecessor of the hot air balloon. The Passarola was intended to serve as an air vessel in order to facilitate communication and as a strategical device. In 1709 John V of Portugal decided to fund Bartolomeu de Gusmão's project following a petition made by the Jesuit priest, and an unmanned demonstration was performed at Casa da Índia in the presence of John V and the queen, Maria Anna of Austria, with the Italian cardinal Michelangelo Conti, two members of the Portuguese Royal Academy of History, one Portuguese diplomat and one chronicler serving as witnesses. This event would bring some European attention to this event and this project. A later article dated on October 20, 1786, by the London Daily Universal Register would state that the inventor was able to raise himself by the use of his prototype. Also in 1709, the Portuguese Jesuit wrote Manifesto summário para os que ignoram poderse navegar pelo elemento do ar (Short Manifesto for those who are unaware that is possible to sail through the element air); he also left designs for a manned air vessel.

In the 1970s, balloonist Julian Nott hypothesized that the Nazca Lines geoglyphs' creation two millennia ago could have been guided by Nazca leaders in a balloon, possibly the earliest hot air balloon flights in human history. To support this theory, in 1975 he designed and piloted the Nazca Prehistoric Balloon, claiming to have used only methods and materials available to the Pre-Inca Peruvians 1,000 years ago.

=== First manned flight ===
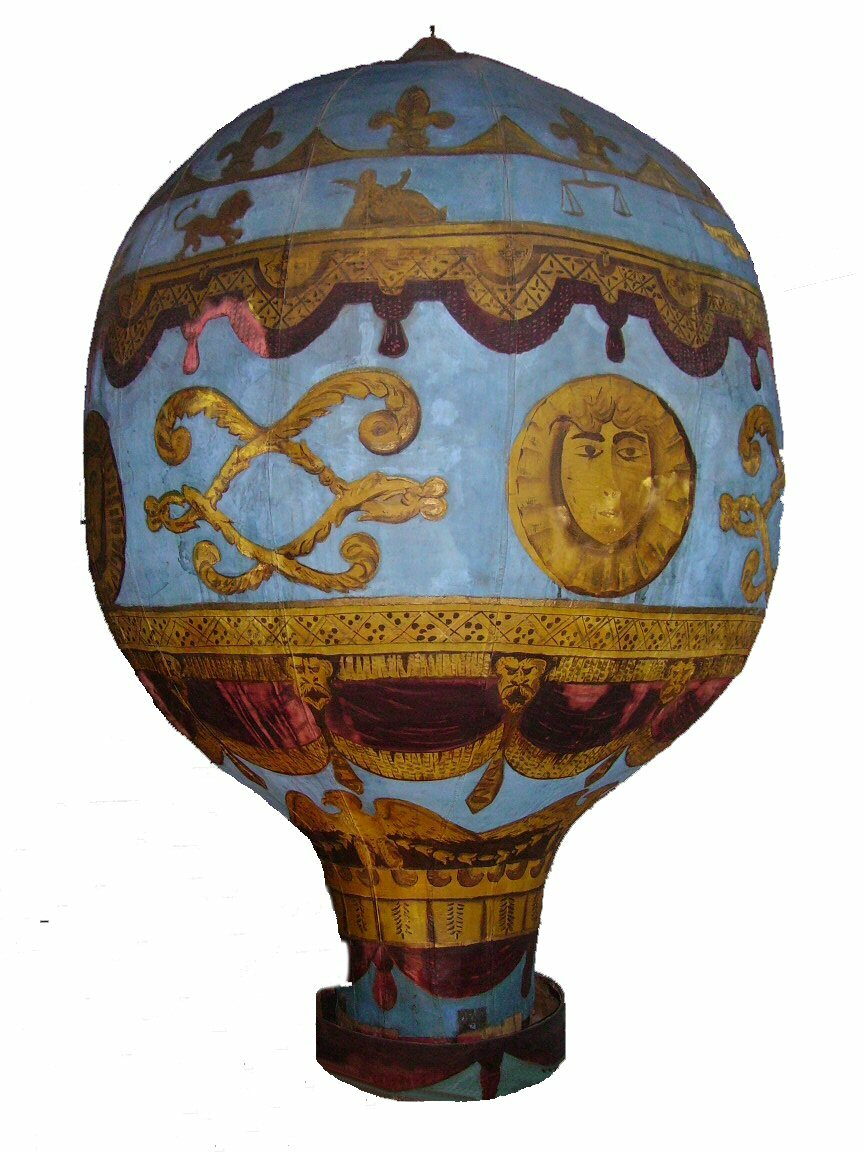
A model of the Montgolfier brothers' balloon at the London Science Museum

The French brothers Joseph-Michel and Jacques-Étienne Montgolfier developed a hot-air balloon in Annonay, Ardèche, France, and demonstrated it publicly on September 19, 1783, making an unmanned flight lasting 10 minutes. After experimenting with unmanned balloons and flights with animals, the first balloon flight with humans aboard, a tethered flight, performed on or around October 15, 1783, by Jean-Francois Pilatre de Rozier, who made at least one tethered flight from the yard of the Reveillon workshop in the Faubourg Saint-Antoine. Later that same day, Pilatre de Rozier became the second human to ascend into the air, reaching an altitude of 26 m (85 ft), the length of the tether. The first free flight with human passengers was made a few weeks later, on November 21, 1783. King Louis XVI had originally decreed that condemned criminals would be the first pilots, but de Rozier, along with Marquis François d'Arlandes, petitioned successfully for the honor. The first military use of a hot air balloon happened on June 26, 1794 during the battle of Fleurus, when the French used the balloon l'Entreprenant for observation.

=== Modern balloons ===
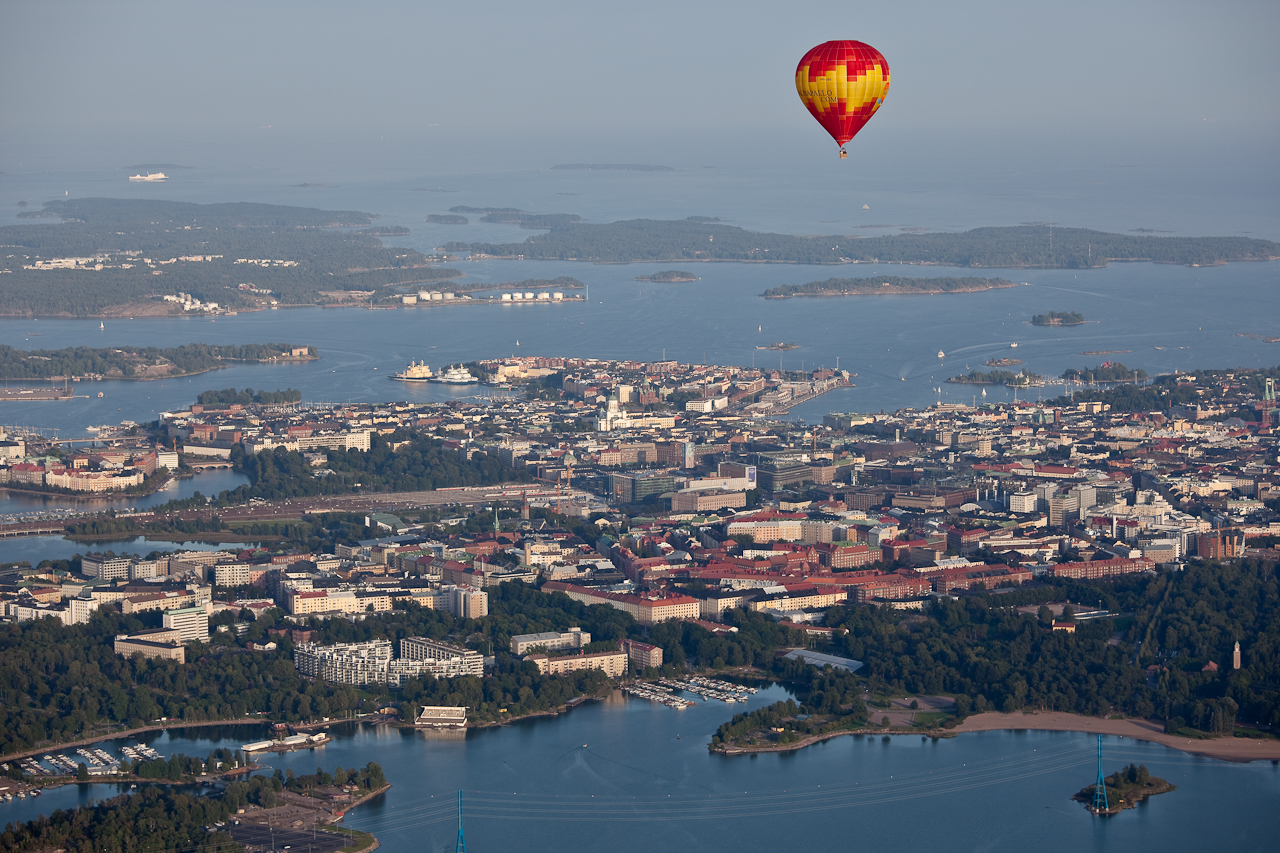
A hot air balloon over the city of Helsinki in September 2009

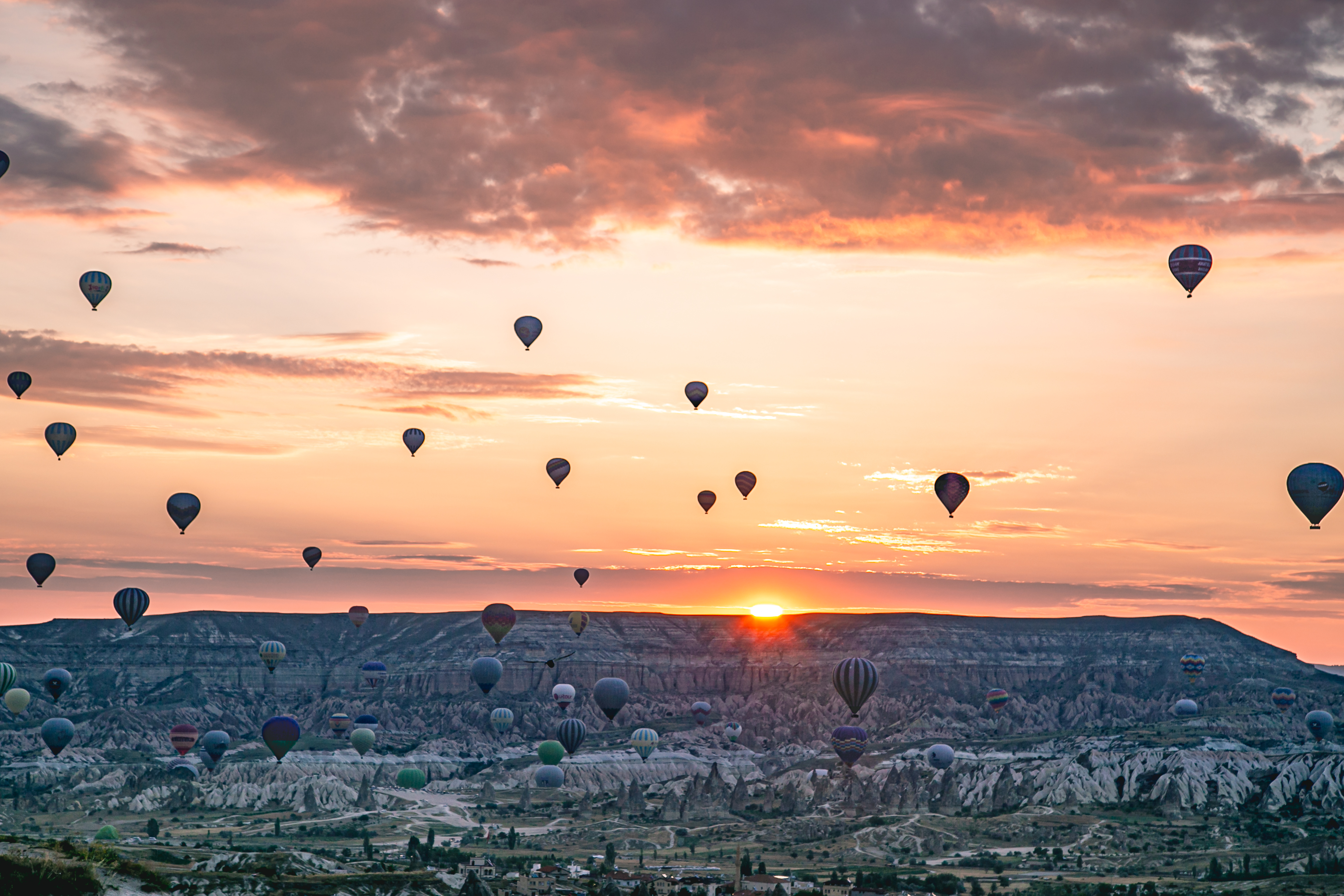
Hot air balloons, Cappadocia sunrise

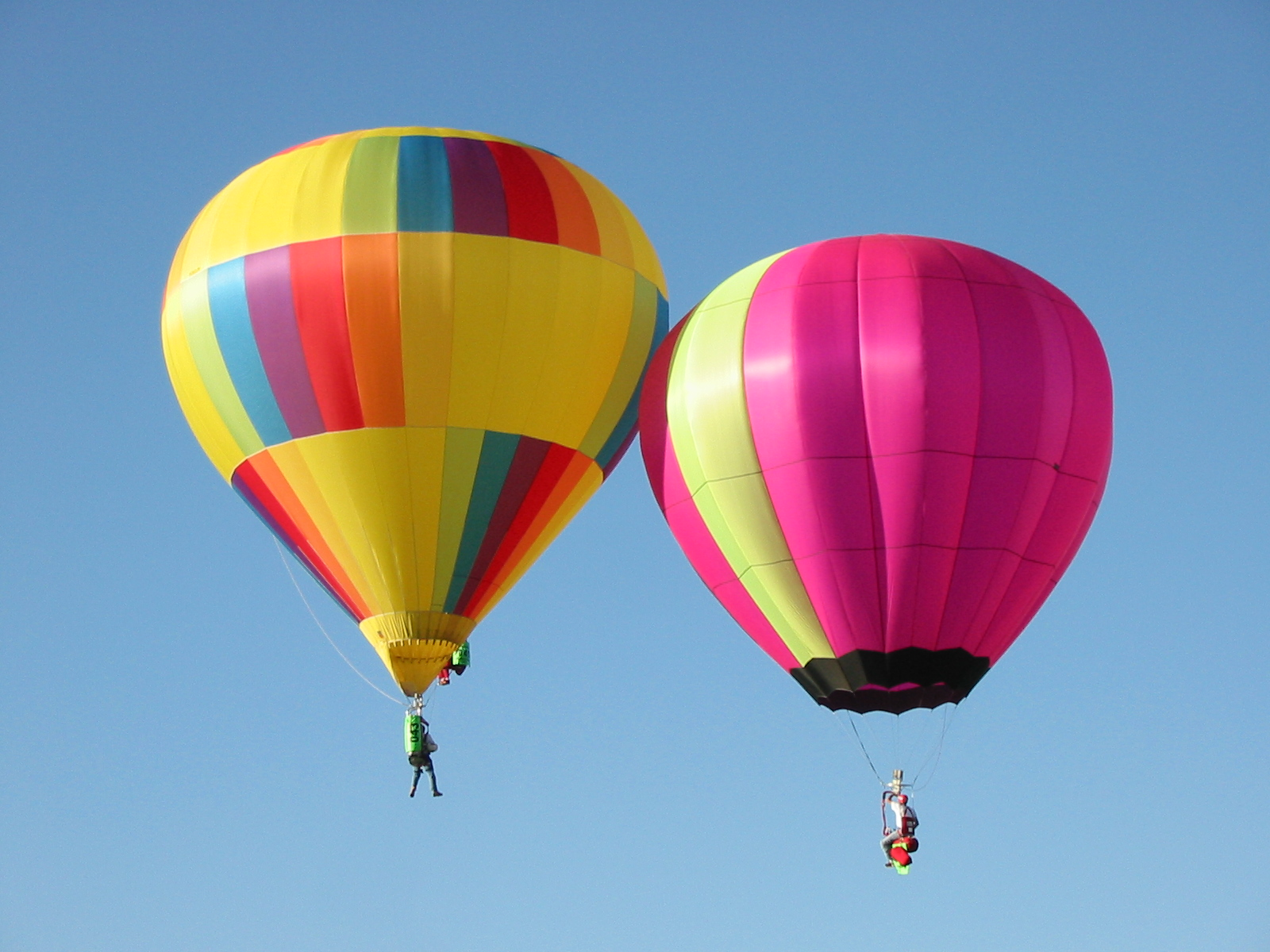
A pair of Hopper balloons

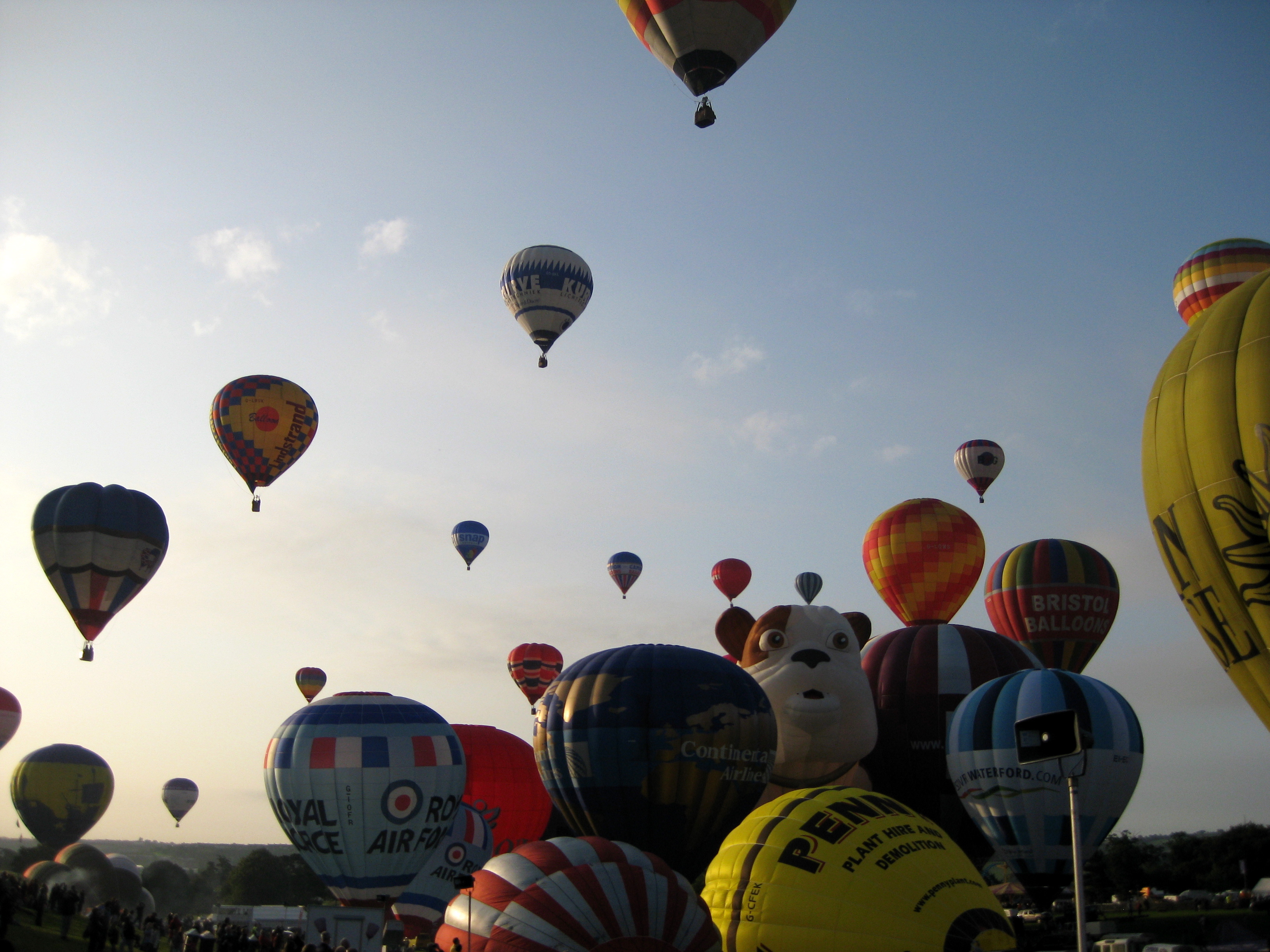
Bristol International Balloon Fiesta

Modern hot air balloons, with an onboard heat source, were developed by Ed Yost and Jim Winker, beginning during the 1950s; their work resulted in the first successful flight on October 22, 1960. The first modern hot air balloon to be made in the United Kingdom (UK) was the Bristol Belle, built in 1967. Presently, hot air balloons are used primarily for recreation.

== Records ==
=== Altitude ===
On November 26, 2005 Vijaypat Singhania set the world altitude record for highest hot air balloon flight, reaching 21,027 m (68,986 ft). He took off from downtown Mumbai, India, and landed 240 km (150 mi) south in Panchale.

The previous record of 19,811 m (64,997 ft) had been set by Per Lindstrand on June 6, 1988, in Plano, Texas.

=== Speed ===
On January 15, 1991, Per Lindstrand (born in Sweden, but resident in the UK) and Richard Branson of the UK flew 7,671.91 km (4,767.10 mi) from Japan to Northern Canada in the “Virgin Pacific Flyer”. With a volume of 74,000 cubic meters (2.6 million cubic feet), the balloon envelope was the largest ever built for a hot air craft. Designed to fly in the trans-oceanic jet streams, the Pacific Flyer recorded the fastest ground speed for a manned balloon at 394 km/h (245 mph).

=== Length ===
The longest duration record was set by Swiss psychiatrist Bertrand Piccard (Auguste Piccard's grandson) and Briton Brian Jones, flying in the Breitling Orbiter 3. It was the first nonstop trip around the world by balloon. The balloon left Château-d'Oex, Switzerland, on March 1, 1999, and landed at 1:02 a.m. on March 21 in the Egyptian desert 500 km (300 mi) south of Cairo. The two men exceeded distance, endurance, and time records, traveling 19 days, 21 hours, and 55 minutes.

=== Briefest trip around the world ===
Steve Fossett, flying solo, exceeded the record for briefest time traveling around the world on 3 July 2002 on his sixth attempt, in 320 h 33 min. Fedor Konyukhov flew solo round the world on his first attempt in a hybrid hot air/helium balloon from 11 to 23 July 2016 for a round-the world time of 268 h 20 min.

== Construction ==
Basic hot air balloon structure

A hot air balloon for manned flight uses a single-layered, fabric gas bag (lifting "envelope"), with an opening at the bottom called the mouth or throat. Attached to the envelope is a basket, or gondola, for carrying the passengers. Mounted above the basket and centered in the mouth is the "burner", which injects a flame into the envelope, heating the air within. The heater or burner is fueled by propane, a liquefied gas stored in pressure vessels, similar to high-pressure forklift cylinders.

=== Envelope ===
Modern hot air balloons are usually made of materials such as ripstop nylon or dacron (a polyester).

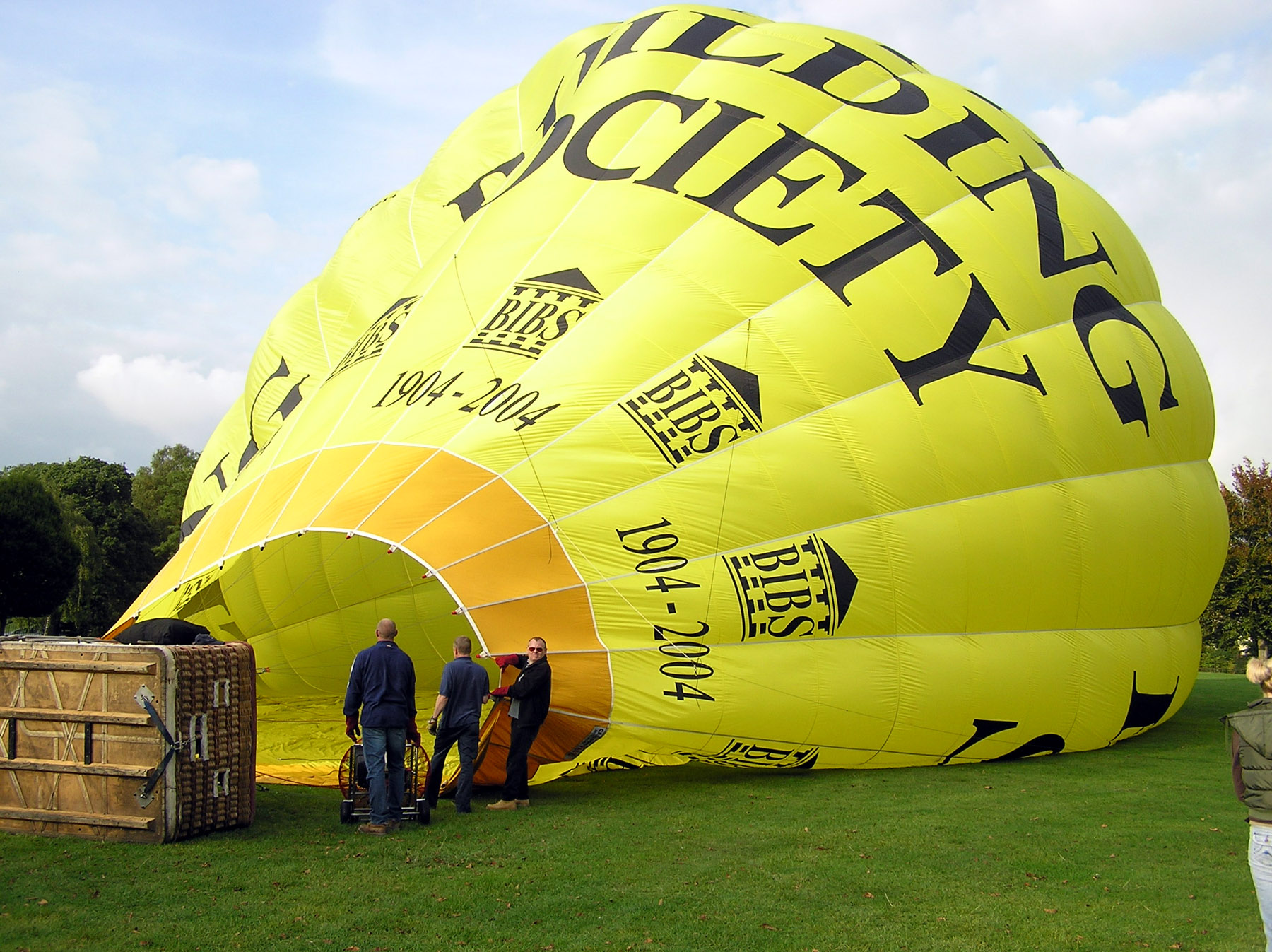
A hot air balloon is inflated partially with cold air from a gasoline-powered fan, before the propane burners are used for final inflation.

During the manufacturing process, the material is cut into panels and sewn together, along with structural load tapes that carry the weight of the gondola or basket. The individual sections, which extend from the throat to the crown (top) of the envelope, are known as gores or gore sections. Envelopes can have as few as 4 gores or as many as 24 or more.

Envelopes often have a crown ring at their very top. This is a hoop of smooth metal, usually aluminium, and approximately 30 cm (1 ft) in diameter. Vertical load tapes from the envelope are attached to the crown ring.

At the bottom of the envelope the vertical load tapes are sewn into loops that are connected to cables (one cable per load tape). These cables, often referred to as flying wires, are connected to the basket by carabiners.

==== Seams ====
The most common technique for sewing panels together is called the French felled, French fell, or double lap seam. The two pieces of fabric are folded over on each other at their common edge, possibly with a load tape as well, and sewn together with two rows of parallel stitching. Other methods include a flat lap seam, in which the two pieces of fabric are held together simply with two rows of parallel stitching, and a zigzag, where parallel zigzag stitching holds a double lap of fabric.

Hot air balloon's envelopes come in different patterns. For example (left to right): horizontal, vertical, spiral, and chevron.

==== Coatings ====
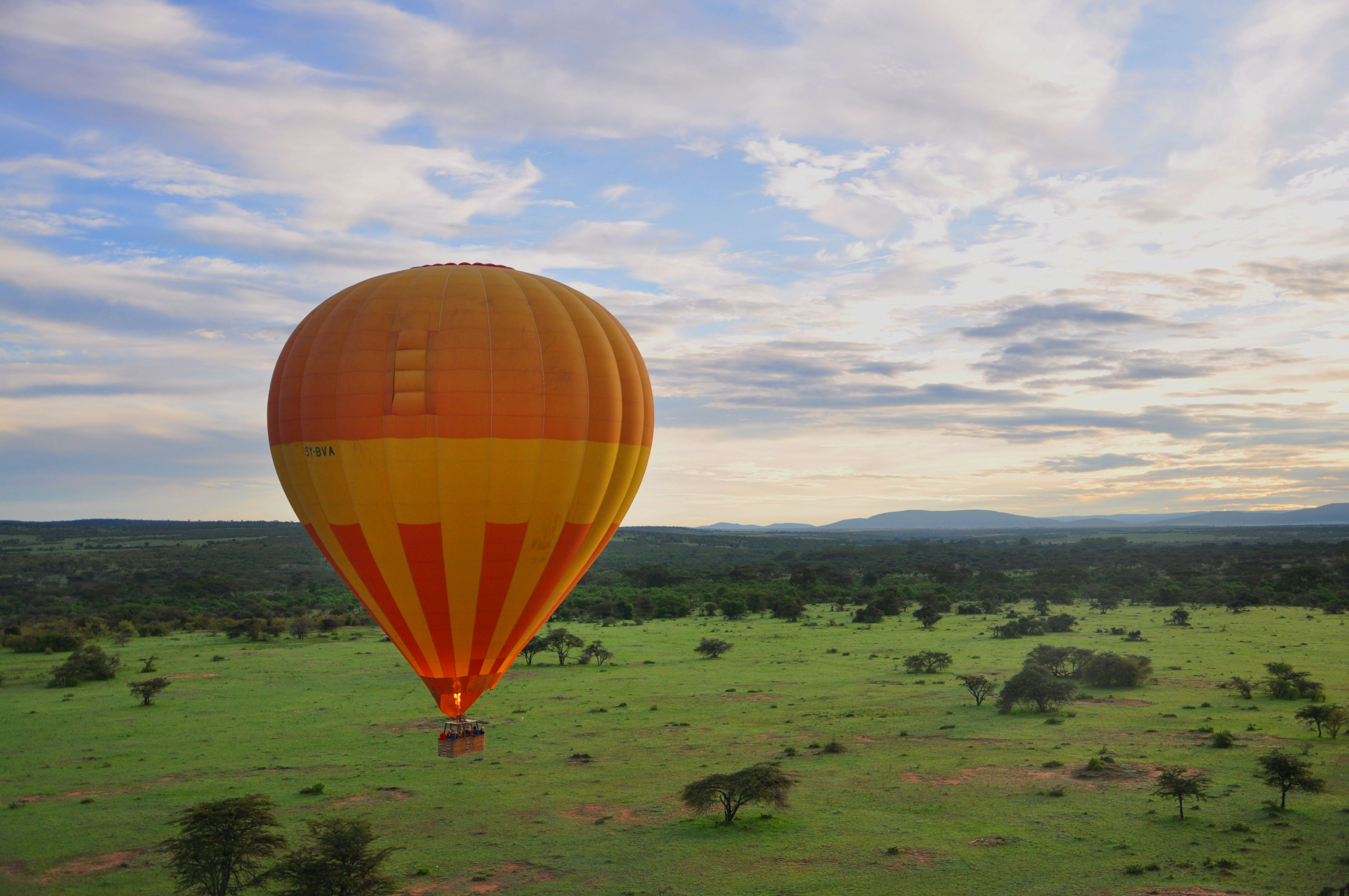
Hot air balloon safari in Maasai Mara

The fabric (or at least part of it, the top 1/3, for example) may be coated with a sealer, such as silicone or polyurethane, to make it impermeable to air. It is often the degradation of this coating and the corresponding loss of impermeability that ends the effective life of an envelope, not weakening of the fabric itself. Heat, moisture, and mechanical wear-and-tear during set-up and pack-up are the primary causes of degradation. Once an envelope becomes too porous to fly, it may be retired and discarded or perhaps used as a "rag bag": cold-inflated and opened for children to run through. Products for recoating the fabric are becoming available commercially.

==== Sizes and capacity ====
A range of envelope sizes is available. The smallest, one-person, basket-less balloons (called "Hoppers" or "Cloudhoppers") have as little as 600 m^{3} (21,000 cu ft) of envelope volume; for a perfect sphere the radius would be around 5 m (16 ft). At the other end of the scale, balloons used by commercial sightseeing operations may be able to carry well over two dozen people, with envelope volumes of up to 17,000 m^{3} (600,000 cu ft). The most-used size is about 2,800 m^{3} (99,000 cu ft), allowing to carry 3 to 5 people.

==== Vents ====
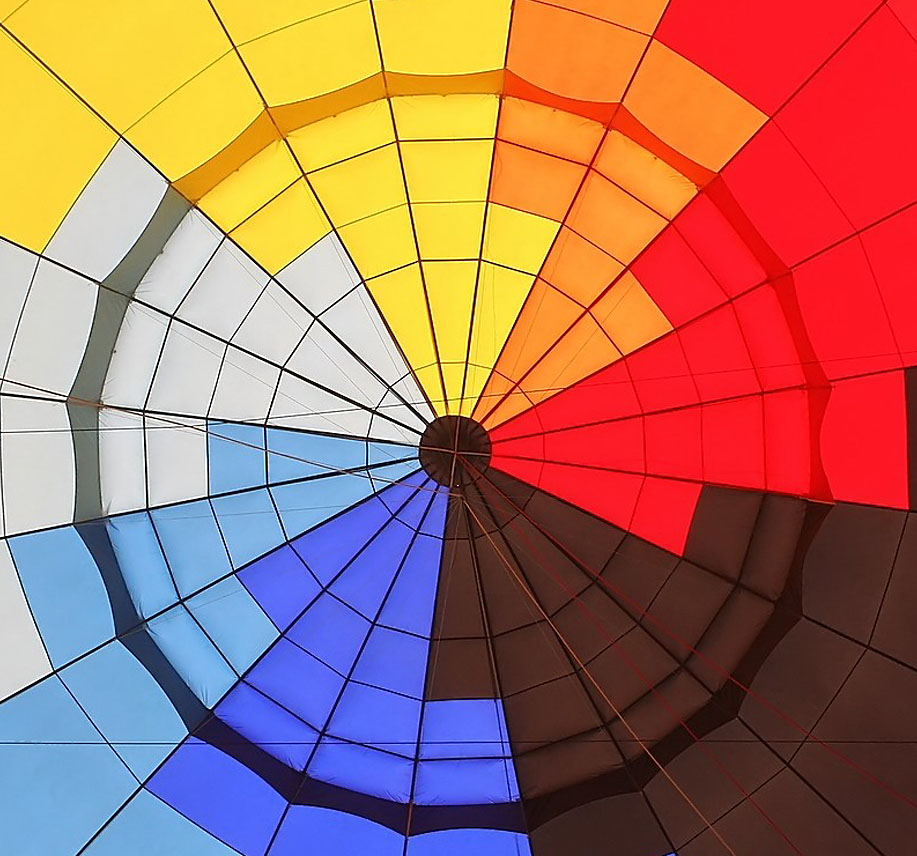
The parachute vent at the top of an envelope, as seen from below through the mouth

The top of the balloon usually has a vent of some sort, enabling the pilot to release hot air to slow an ascent, start a descent, or increase the rate of descent, usually for landing. Some hot air balloons have turning vents, which are side vents that, when opened, cause the balloon to rotate. Such vents are particularly useful for balloons with rectangular baskets, to facilitate aligning the wider side of the basket for landing.

Structure of hot air balloon vent / deflation port

The most common type of top vent is a disk-shaped flap of fabric called a parachute vent, invented by Tracy Barnes. The fabric is connected around its edge to a set of "vent lines" that converge in the center. (The arrangement of fabric and lines roughly resembles a parachute—thus the name.) These "vent lines" are themselves connected to a control line that runs to the basket. A parachute vent is opened by pulling on the control line. Once the control line is released, the pressure of the remaining hot air pushes the vent fabric back into place. A parachute vent can be opened briefly while in flight to initiate a rapid descent. (Slower descents are initiated by allowing the air in the balloon to cool naturally.) The vent is pulled open completely to collapse the balloon after landing.

An older, and presently less commonly used, style of top vent is called a "Velcro-style" vent. This too is a disk of fabric at the top of the balloon. However, rather than having a set of "vent lines" that can repeatedly open and close the vent, the vent is secured by "hook and loop" fasteners (such as Velcro) and is only opened at the end of the flight. Balloons equipped with a Velcro-style vent typically have a second "maneuvering vent" built into the side (as opposed to the top) of the balloon. Another common type of top design is the "smart vent", which, rather than lowering a fabric disc into the envelope as in the "parachute" type, gathers the fabric together in the center of the opening. This system can theoretically be used for in-flight maneuvering, but is more commonly used only as a rapid-deflation device for use after landing, of particular value in high winds. Other designs, such as the "pop top" and "MultiVent" systems, have also attempted to address the need for rapid deflation on landing, but the parachute top remains popular as an all-around maneuvering and deflation system.

Semco deflation system uses a brass rod to hold together a "deflation sleeve" at the top of the balloon. During normal operations, the brass rod threads through rings that hold the deflation sleeve shut like stitches. When the balloon needs to be deflated, the pilot releases their deflation cable at the basket, which causes locking cables attaching to the brass rod to loosen and brass rod to retract under the force of an elastic cord, thus opening up the sleeve.

==== Shape ====
Besides special shapes, possibly for marketing purposes, there are several variations on the traditional "inverted tear drop" shape. The simplest, often used by home builders, is a hemisphere on top of a truncated cone. More sophisticated designs attempt to minimize the circumferential stress on the fabric, with different degrees of success depending on whether they take fabric weight and varying air density into account. This shape may be referred to as "natural". Finally, some specialized balloons are designed to minimize aerodynamic drag (in the vertical direction) to improve flight performance in competitions.

=== Basket ===
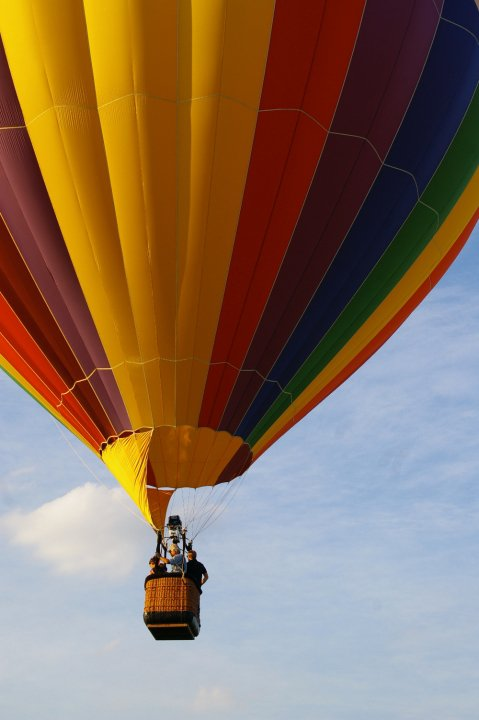
Hot air balloon basket in flight

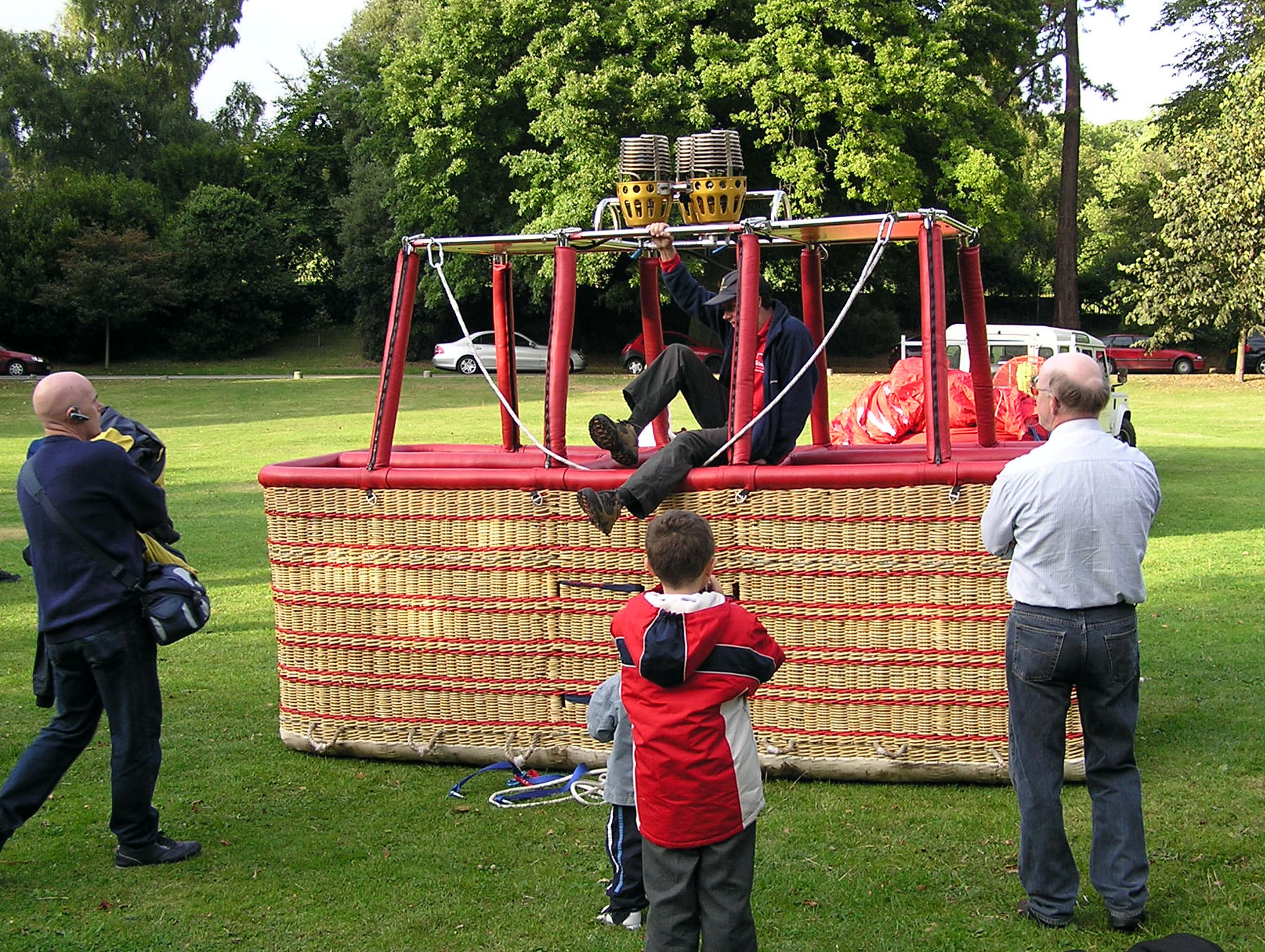
A wicker basket capable of holding 16 passengers

Hot air balloon baskets are commonly made of woven wicker or rattan. These materials have proven to be sufficiently light, strong, and durable for balloon flight. Such baskets are usually rectangular or triangular in shape. They vary in size from just big enough for two people to large enough to carry thirty. Larger baskets often have internal partitions for structural bracing and to compartmentalize the passengers. Small holes may be woven into the side of the basket to act as foot holds for passengers climbing in or out.

Baskets may also be made of aluminium, especially a collapsible aluminium frame with a fabric skin, to reduce weight or increase portability. In this case, the basket is commonly referred to as a gondola. These may be used by pilots without a ground crew or who are attempting to set altitude, duration, or distance records. Other specialty baskets include the fully enclosed gondolas used for around-the-world attempts and baskets that consist of little more than a seat for the pilot and perhaps one passenger.

=== Burner ===
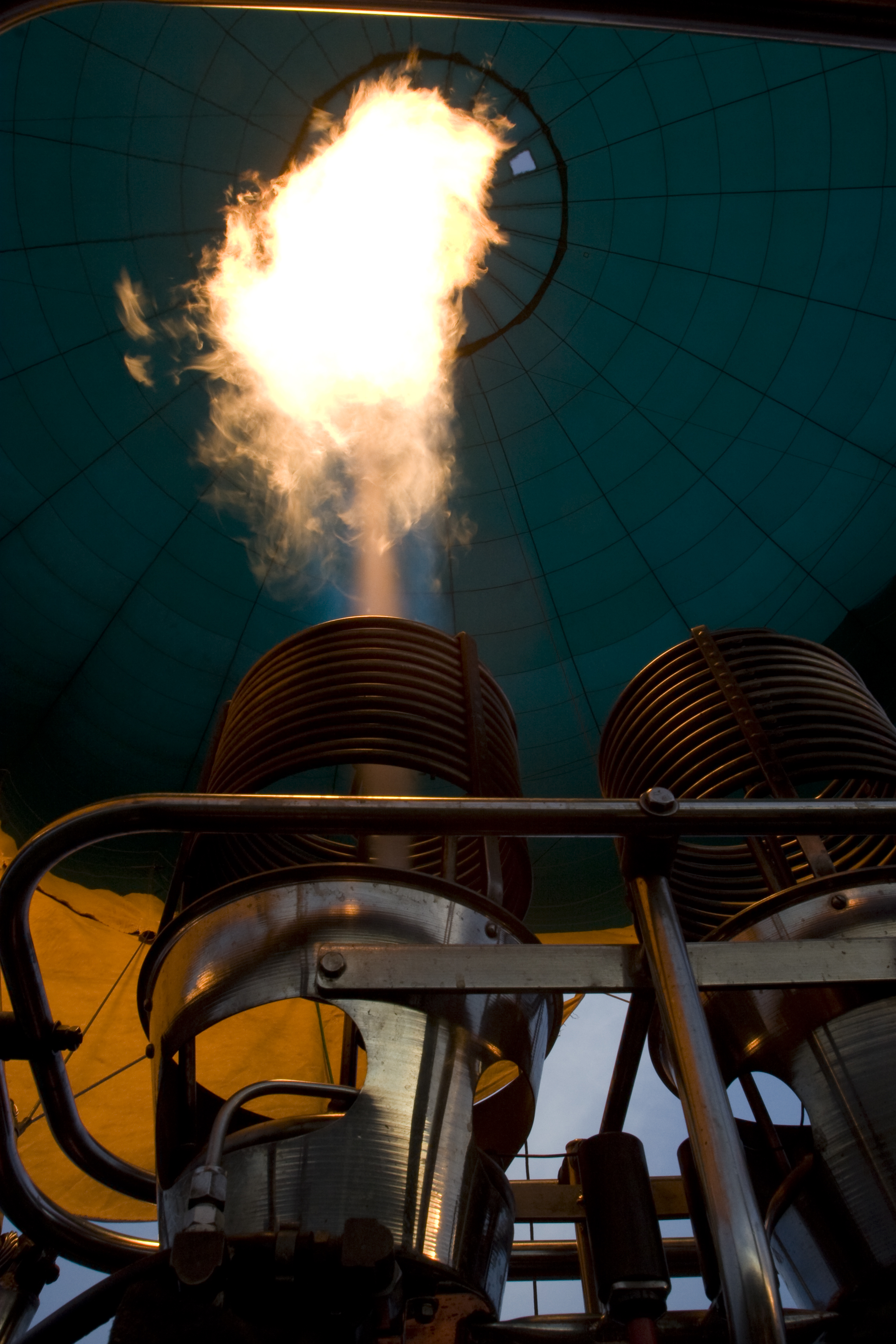
A burner directing a flame into the envelope

Structure of a single burner: 1. Valve block assembly; 2. Burner can; 3. Coil assembly; 4. Liquid fire jet assembly; 5. Ignitor assembly; 6. Pilot light assembly

Structure of a double burner: 1. Burner can; 2. Coil assembly; 3. Liquid fire jet assembly; 4. Ignitor assembly; 5. Pilot light assembly; 6. Coil post; 7. Liquid fire valve assembly; 8. Handle tube; 9. Main valve assembly; 10. Swivel assembly; 11. Gimbal block cap lower; 12. Gimbal block cap upper; 13. Pressure gauge assembly; 14. Gimbal tension adjustment screw; 15. Gimbal mounting screw

The burner unit gasifies liquid propane, mixes it with air, ignites the mixture, and directs the flame and exhaust into the mouth of the envelope. Burners vary in power output; each will generally produce 2 to 3 MW of heat (7 to 10 million BTUs per hour), with double, triple, or quadruple burner configurations installed where more power is needed. The pilot actuates a burner by opening a propane valve, known as a blast valve. The valve may be spring-loaded, so that it closes automatically, or it may stay open until closed by the pilot. The burner has a pilot light to ignite the propane and air mixture. The pilot light may be lit by the pilot with an external device, such as a flint striker or a lighter, or with a built-in piezoelectric spark.

Where more than one burner is present, the pilot can use one or more at a time, depending on the desired heat output. Each burner has a metal coil of propane tubing the flame shoots through to preheat the incoming liquid propane. The burner unit may be suspended from the mouth of the envelope or supported rigidly over the basket. The burner unit may be mounted on a gimbal to enable the pilot to aim the flame and avoid overheating the envelope fabric. A burner may have a secondary propane valve that releases propane more slowly and thereby generates a different sound. This is called a whisper burner and is used for flight over livestock to lessen the chance of spooking them. It also generates a more yellow flame and is used for night glows because it lights up the inside of the envelope better than the primary valve.

=== Fuel tanks ===
Fuel system diagram

Propane fuel tanks are usually cylindrical pressure vessels made from aluminium, stainless steel, or titanium with a valve at one end to feed the burner and to refuel. They may have a fuel gauge and a pressure gauge. Common tank sizes are 38, 57 and 76 litres (10, 15 and 20 US gallons). They may be intended for upright or horizontal use and may be mounted inside or outside the basket.

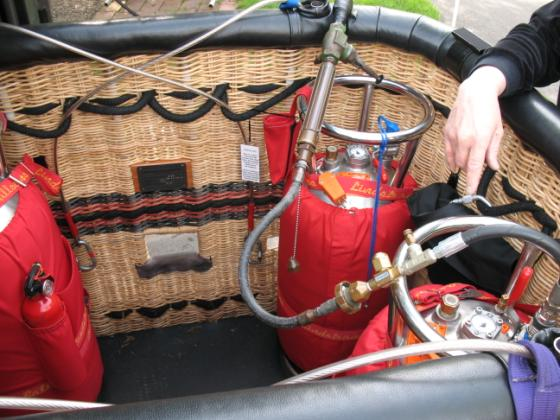
Stainless steel fuel tanks, wrapped in red insulating covers, mounted vertically, and with fuel gauges, during refueling

The pressure necessary to force the fuel through the line to the burner may be supplied by the vapor pressure of the propane itself, if warm enough, or by the introduction of an inert gas such as nitrogen. Tanks may be preheated with electrical heat tapes to produce sufficient vapor pressure for cold-weather flying. Warmed tanks are usually also wrapped in an insulating blanket to preserve heat during the setup and flight.

=== Instrumentation ===
A balloon may be outfitted with a variety of instruments to aid the pilot. These commonly include an altimeter, a rate-of-climb (vertical-speed) indicator known as a variometer, envelope (air) temperature, and ambient (air) temperature. A GPS receiver can be useful to indicate ground speed (traditional aircraft air-speed indicators would be useless) and direction.

=== Combined mass ===
The combined mass of an average system can be calculated as follows:

Component	Pounds	Kilograms	Mass fraction
2,800 m^{3} (100,000 cu ft) envelope	250	113.4	3.3%
5-passenger basket	140	63.5	1.9%
Double burner	50	22.7	0.7%
3 76 L (20 US gal) fuel tanks full of propane	3 × 135 = 405	183.7	5.4%
5 passengers	5 × 150 = 750	340.2	10.0%
Subtotal	1595	723.5	21.2%
2,800 m^{3} (100,000 cu ft) of heated air*	5922	2686.2	78.8%
Total	(3.76 tons) 7517	3409.7	100.0%

* Using a density of 0.9486 kg/m^{3} (0.05922 lb/cu ft) for dry air heated to 99 °C (210 °F).

== Theory of operation ==
=== Generating lift ===
Increasing the air temperature inside the envelope makes it less dense than the surrounding (ambient) air. The balloon floats because of the buoyant force exerted on it. This force is the same force that acts on objects when they are in water and is described by Archimedes' principle. The amount of lift (or buoyancy) provided by a hot air balloon depends primarily upon the difference between the temperature of the air inside the envelope and the temperature of the air outside the envelope. For most envelopes made of nylon fabric, the maximal internal temperature is limited to approximately 120 °C (250 °F).

The melting point of nylon is significantly greater than this maximal operating temperature—about 230 °C (450 °F)—but higher temperatures cause the strength of the nylon fabric to degrade more quickly over time. With a maximal operating temperature of 120 °C (250 °F), balloon envelopes can generally be flown for between 400 and 500 hours before the fabric needs to be replaced. Many balloon pilots operate their envelopes at temperatures significantly less than the maximum to extend envelope-fabric life.

The lift generated by 2,800 m^{3} (100,000 cu ft) of dry air heated to various temperatures may be calculated as follows:

A hot air balloon being inflated at the annual Ashland, Ohio, Balloonfest.

{| class="wikitable" style=text-align:center; |- ! Air temperature
°C (°F) ! Air density
kg/m3 (lb/cu ft) ! Air mass
kg (lb) ! Lift generated
kg (lb) |- | 20 (68) | 1.2041 (0.07517) | 3,409.7 (7,517) | 0, (0) |- | 99 (210) | 0.9486 (0.05922) | 2,686.2 (5,922) | 723.5 (1,595) |- | 120 (248) | 0.8978 (0.05605) | 2,542.4 (5,605) | 867.3 (1,912) |}

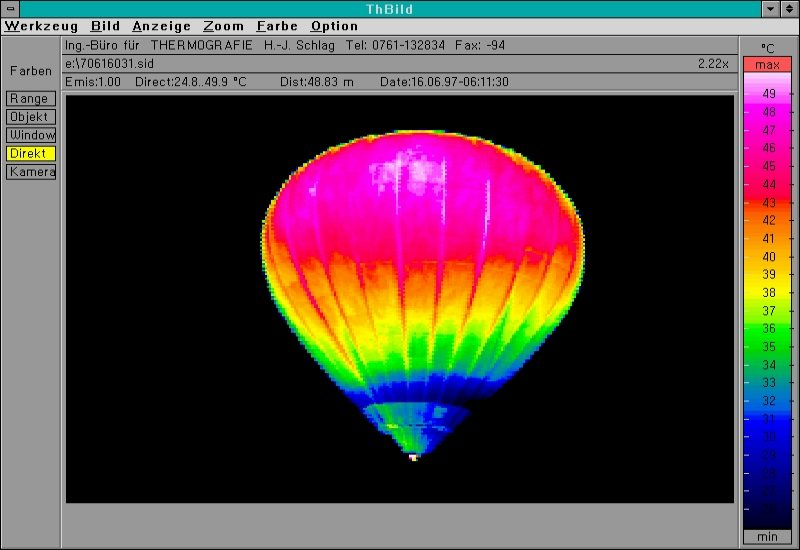
Thermal image showing temperature variation in a hot air balloon

The density of air at 20 °C (68 °F) is about 1.2 kg/m^{3} (0.075 lb/cu ft). The total lift for a balloon of 2,800 m^{3} (100,000 cu ft) heated to 99 °C (210 °F) would be 723.5 kg (1,595 lb). This is just enough to generate neutral buoyancy for the total system mass (not including the heated air trapped in the envelope, of course) stated in the previous section. Liftoff would require a slightly greater temperature, depending on the desired rate of climb. In reality, the air contained in the envelope is not all at the same temperature, as the accompanying thermal image shows, and so these calculations are based on averages.

For typical atmospheric conditions (20 °C or 68 °F), a hot air balloon heated to 99 °C (210 °F) requires about 3.91 m^{3} of envelope volume to lift 1 kilogram (equivalently, 62.5 cu ft/lb). The precise amount of lift provided depends not only upon the internal temperature mentioned above, but the external temperature, altitude above sea level, and humidity of the air surrounding. On a warm day, a balloon cannot lift as much as on a cool day, because the temperature required for launch will exceed the maximum sustainable for nylon envelope fabric. Also, in the lower atmosphere, the lift provided by a hot air balloon decreases about 3% per 1,000 m (1% per 1,000 ft) of altitude gained.

=== Types of hot air balloons ===
There are several different types of hot air balloons, all with different means of taking and sustaining flight.

==== Montgolfier ====
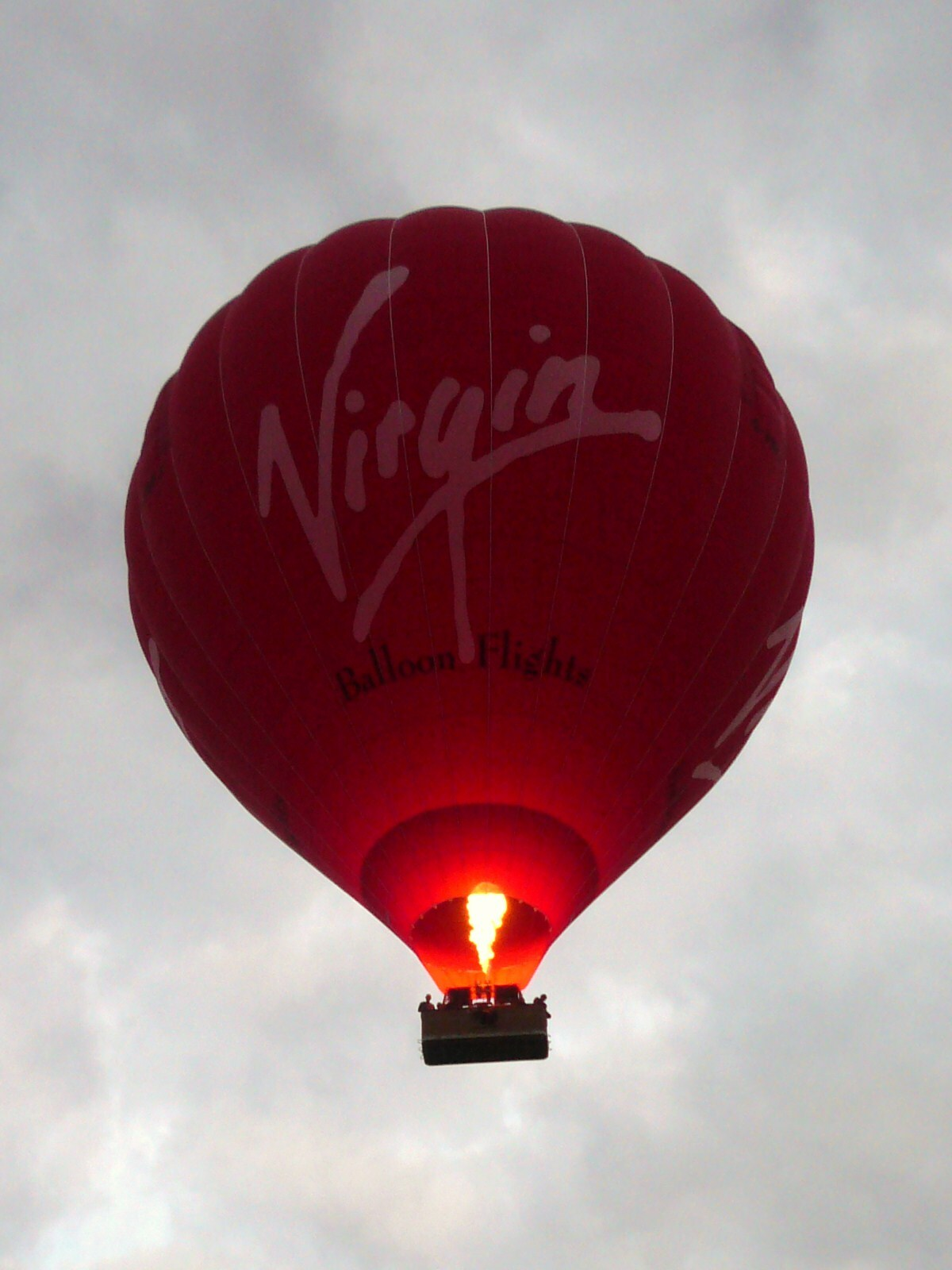
A Virgin hot air balloon flying over Cambridge

Standard hot air balloons are known as Montgolfier balloons and rely solely on the buoyancy of hot air provided by the burner and contained by the envelope. This style of balloon was developed by the Montgolfier brothers and had its first public demonstration on 4 June 1783 with an unmanned flight lasting 10 minutes, followed later that year with manned flights.

==== Gas ====
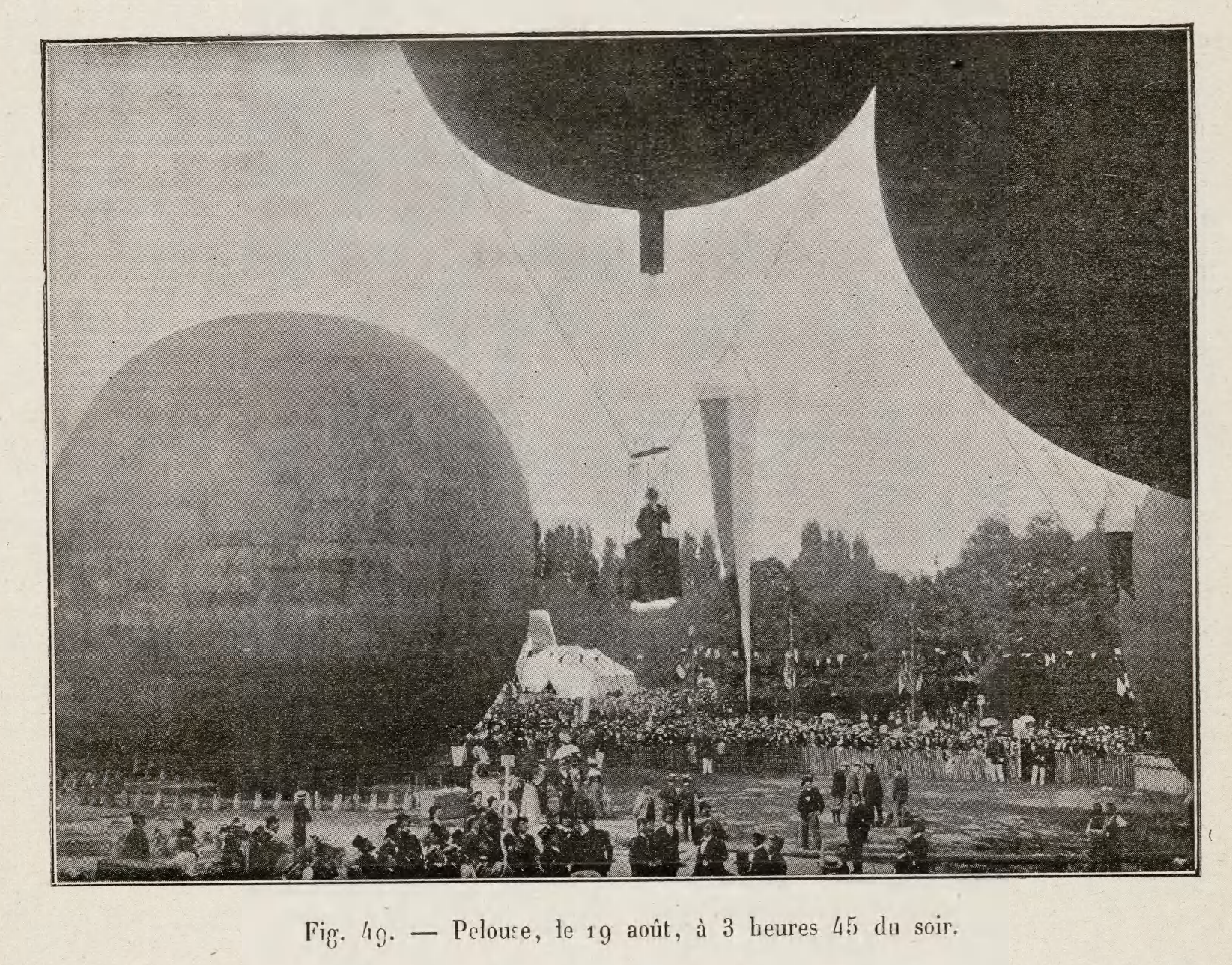
1900 Olympics ballooning event at Le Parc d'aerostation, Paris

Instead of using regular air it is also possible to use lighter than air gasses such as Helium or Hydrogen to lift the balloon, though this means it is technically not a hot air balloon, though they did influence the design of hybrid balloons.

==== Hybrid ====
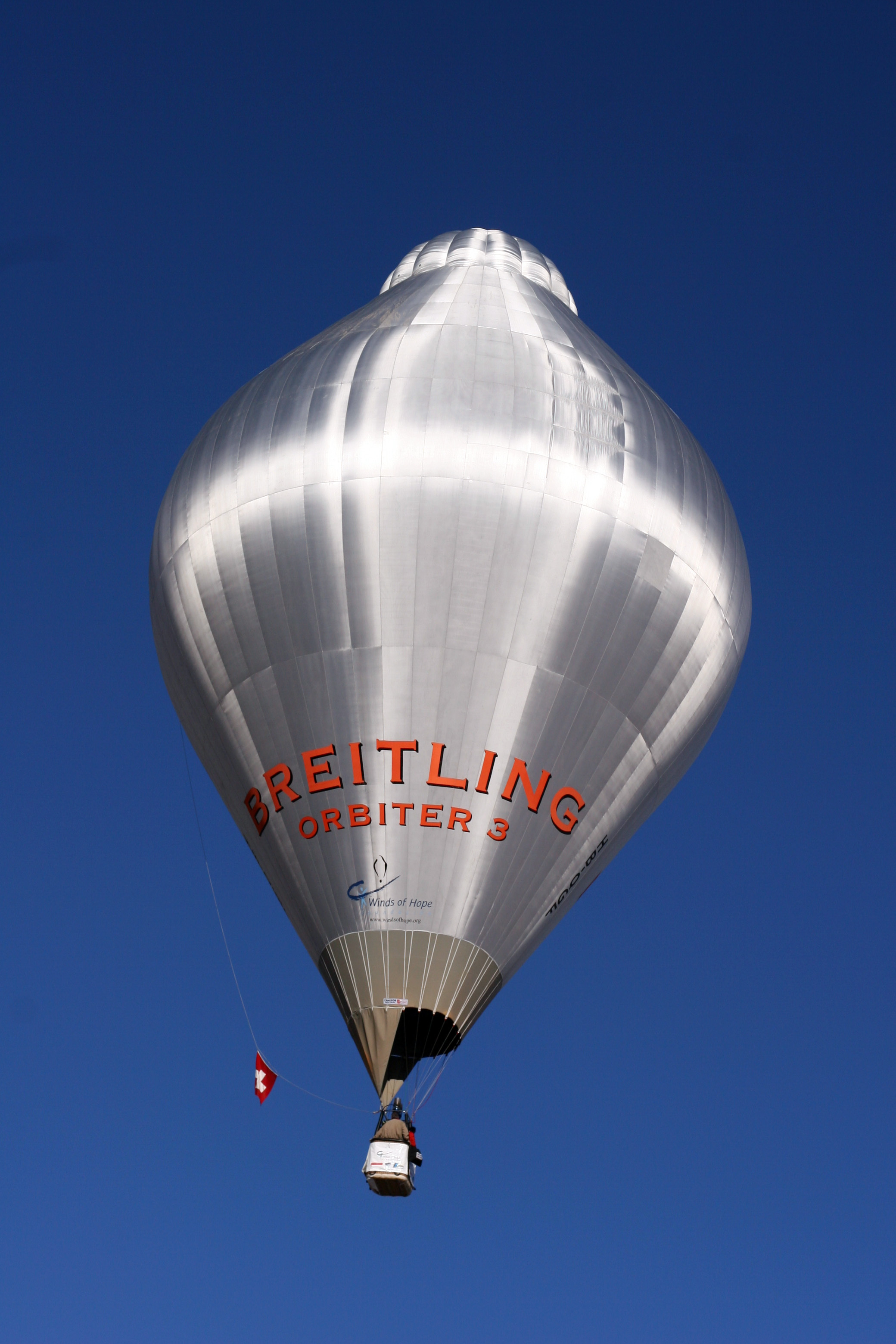
During 1999, Bertrand Piccard and Brian Jones achieved the first non-stop balloon circumnavigation of the globe in Breitling Orbiter 3, a Rozière/Hybrid balloon.

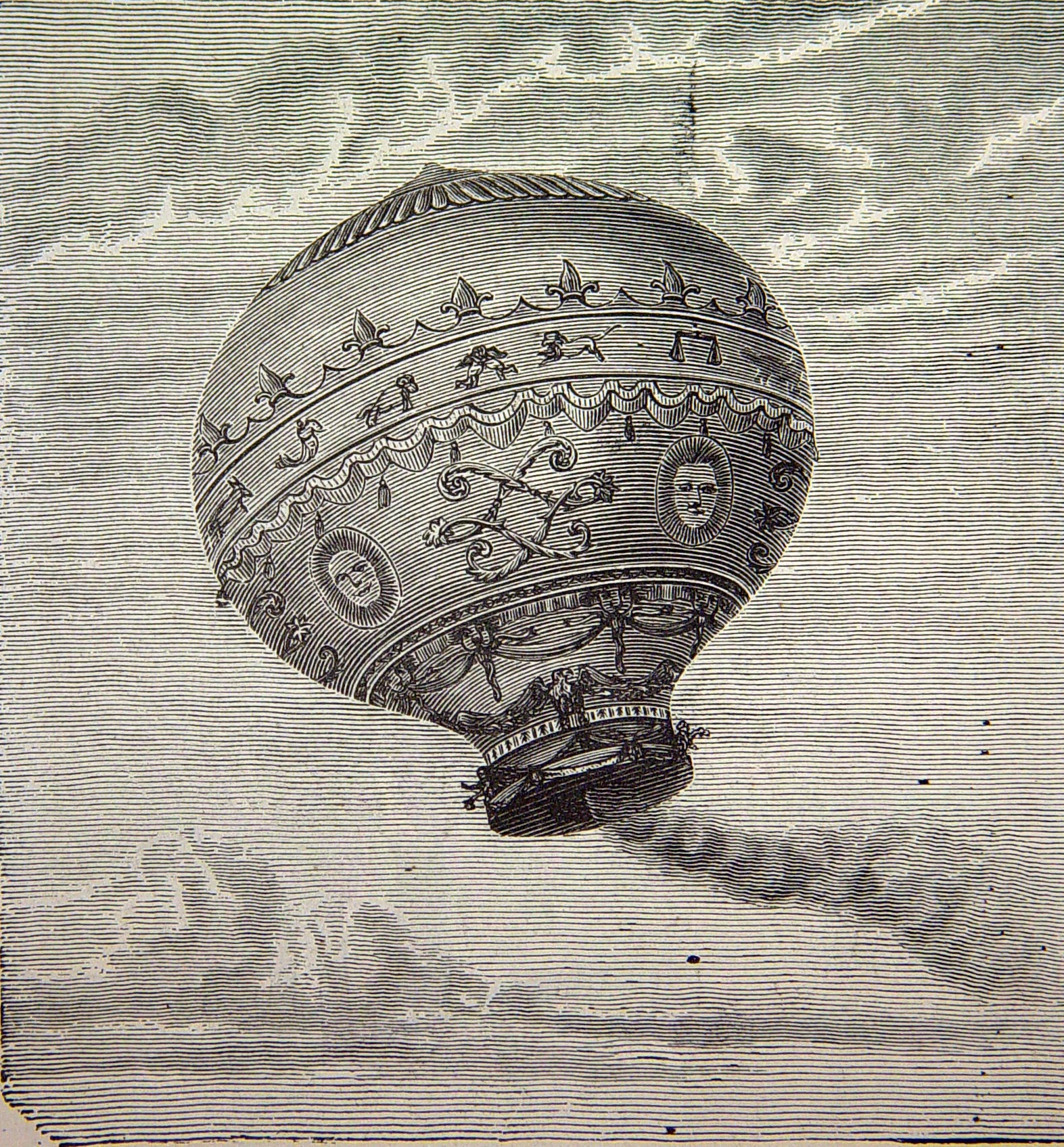
Early depiction of hybrid balloon

The 1785 Rozière balloon, is the main type of hybrid balloon, named after its creator, Jean-François Pilâtre de Rozier. It has a separate cell for a lighter-than-air gas (typically helium), as well as a cone below for hot air (as is used in a hot air balloon) to heat the helium at night. Hydrogen gas was used in the very early stages of development but was quickly abandoned due to the danger of introducing an open flame near the gas, for example when Rozier attempted to cross the English Channel with his prototype, the fire used to heat the air ignited the Hydrogen and killed both him and his copilot thirty minutes after takeoff. As such, all modern hybrid balloons now use helium as a lifting gas. These balloons are commonly used for high performance records for hot air balloons.

==== Solar ====
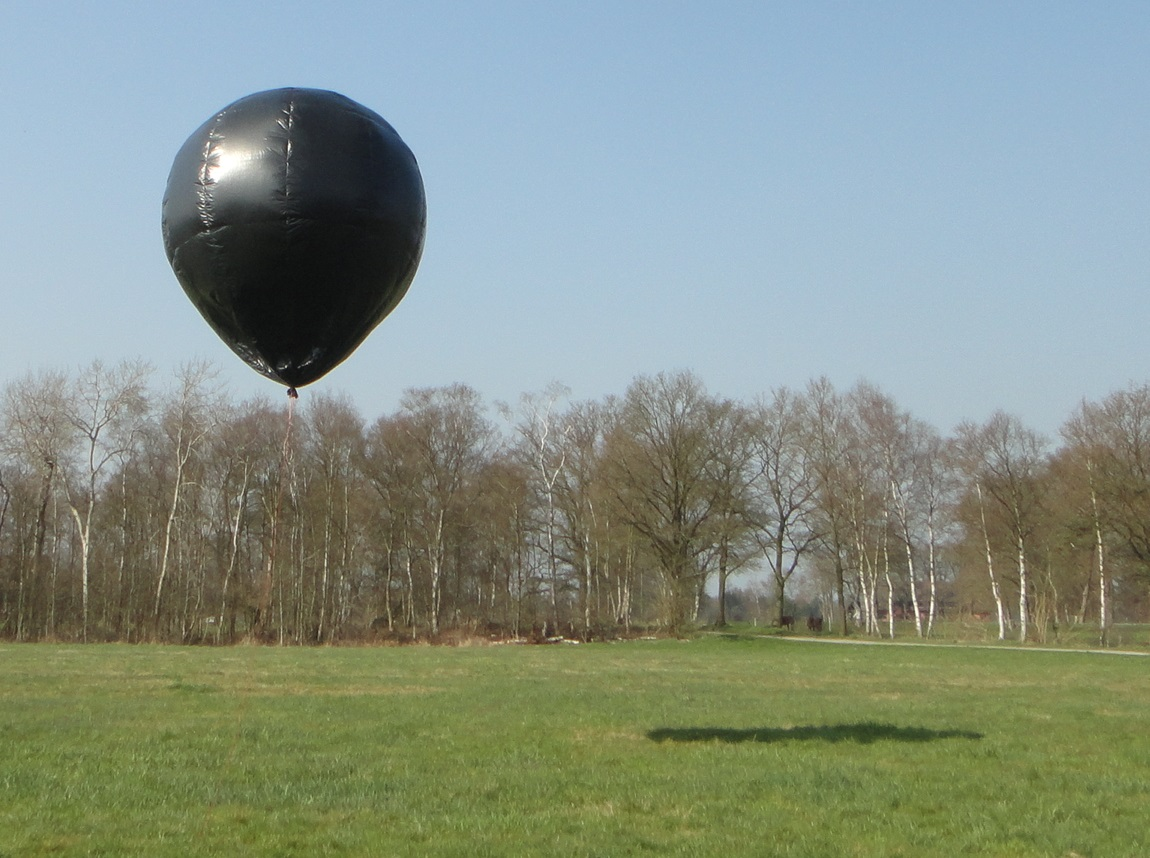
A four-meter-high (13 ft) solar balloon floating over a meadow

Solar balloons are hot air balloons that use just solar energy captured by an envelope. These envelopes are more specialized than for other hot air balloons, trying to maximize the amount of solar energy they collect. This can be accomplished by rotating the envelope during flight or by having the envelope colored black or another dark color. They were pioneered in the 1970s in Europe by Tracy Barnes, Dominic Michaelis, and in the US by Frederick Espoo and Paul Woessher.

==== Thermal airship ====
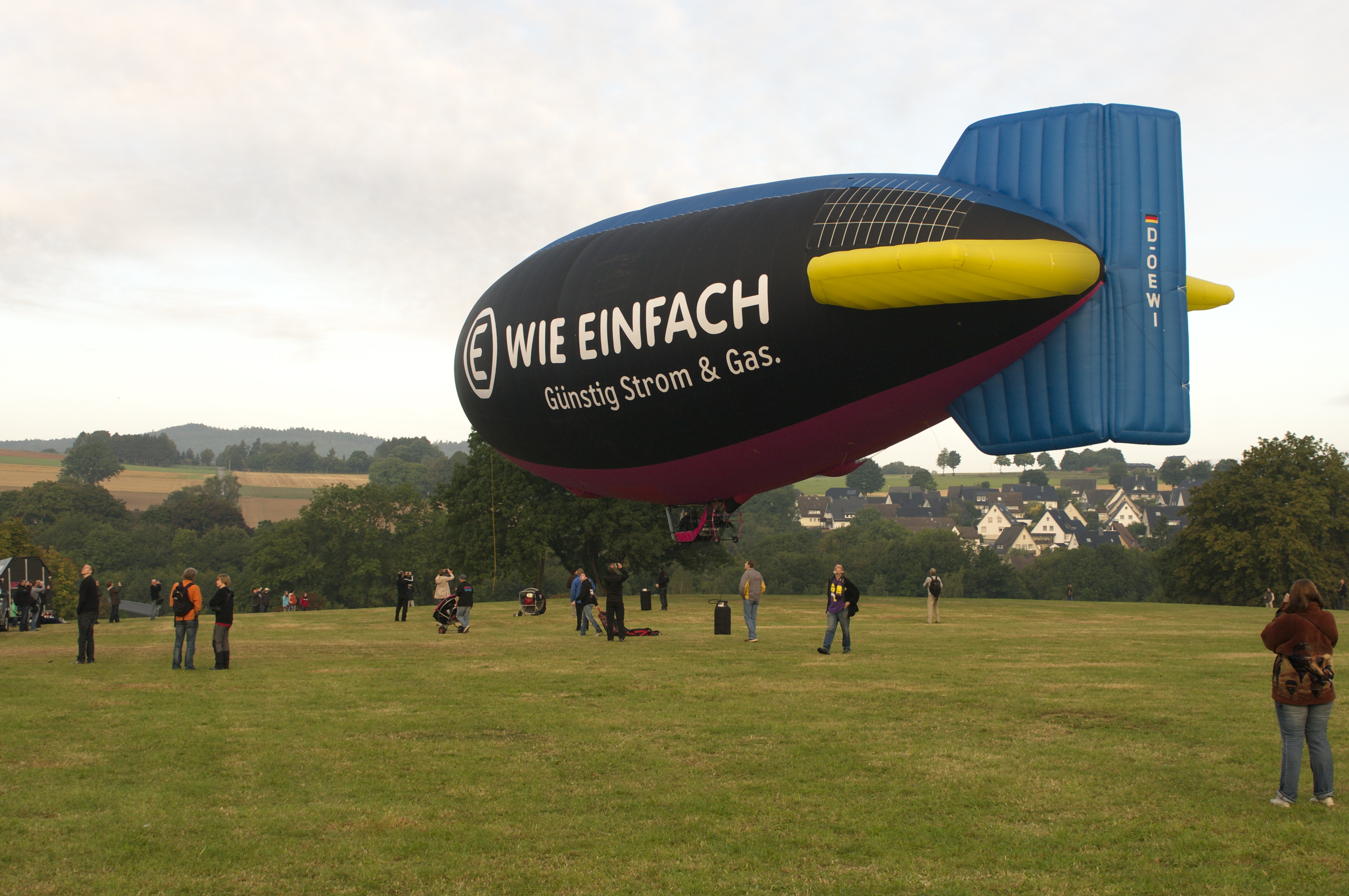
A Thermal airship being prepared for take-off during the "Warsteiner Internationale Montgolfiade" at Warstein (Germany)

A thermal airship, or blimp, became a reality in the 1960s. Thermal airships were the first steerable air buoyant vehicles. They utilized tail fins and a rudder and contained strictly hot air rather than a mix with hydrogen or helium.

==== Observation balloon ====
Observation balloons were deployed as early as the American Civil War and used as reconnaissance towers. The first military funded balloon in America was designed by Thaddeus Lowe on August 2, 1861, for the Union. His design utilized gas from municipal lines to inflate the balloon as he did not have access to a portable generator. Observation balloons during this time were all made using multicolored-silk, wicker baskets, and were vertically oriented and tear shaped. Hydrogen, or illumination gas became the most used inflation fuel by the 20th Century, as it was lighter than air. Observation balloon usage skyrocketed in Britain by the Royal Engineers at the end of the 19th Century, deploying to Sudan in 1885 and to South Africa during the Second Boer War from 1899 to 1902.

=== Steering ===
Due to the overall design of hot air balloons, controlled and precise steering of hot air balloons is not possible; it is possible for pilots to try to achieve basic directional control by changing altitude and catching different wind streams. Wind in the northern hemisphere tends to turn east due to coriolis effect as the altitude increases.

=== Landing ===
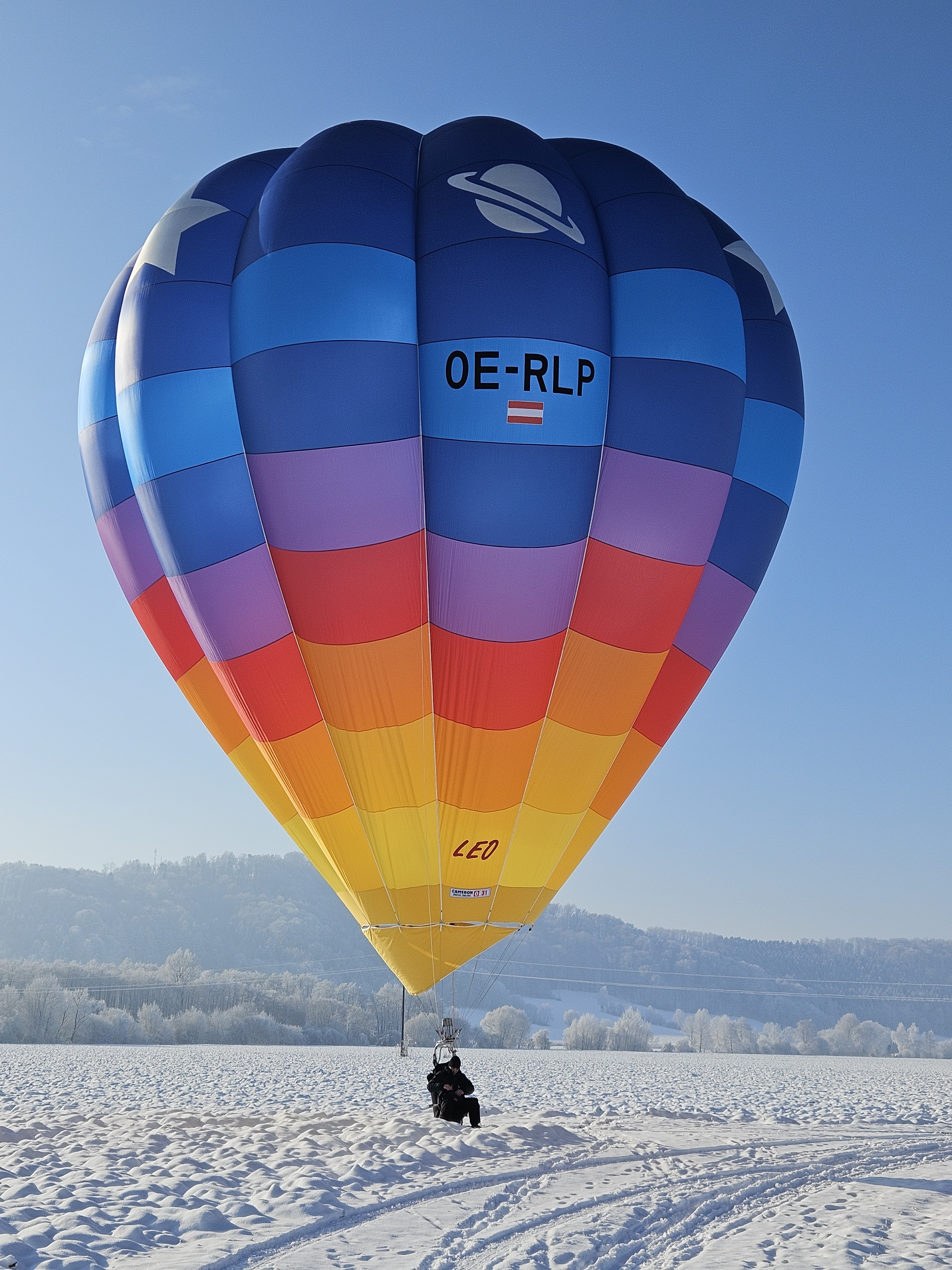
Landing Single Hot Air Balloon

The most effective way of landing a hot air balloon is to reduce the energy in the envelope, either by turning down the flame in Montgolfier and hybrid balloons, or more directly by opening a flap in the envelope that will release the air/gas inside.

== Safety equipment ==
To help ensure the safety of pilot and passengers, a hot air balloon may carry several pieces of safety equipment.

=== Basket ===
To relight the burner if the pilot light goes out and the optional piezo ignition fails, the pilot should have ready access to a means of backup ignition, such as a flint spark lighter. Many systems, especially those that carry passengers, have completely duplicate fuel and burner systems: two fuel tanks, connected to two separate hoses, which feed two distinct burners. This enables a safe landing in the case of a blockage somewhere in one system or if a system must be disabled because of a fuel leak.

A fire extinguisher suitable for extinguishing propane fires is useful. Most balloons carry a 1 or 2 kg AB:E type fire extinguisher.

A handling or drop line is mandatory safety equipment in many countries. This is a rope or webbing of 20–30 meters in length attached to the balloon basket with a quick-release connection at one end. In very calm winds the balloon pilot can throw the handling line from the balloon so that the ground crew can guide the balloon safely away from obstructions on the ground.

For commercial passenger balloons, a pilot restraint harness is mandatory in some countries. This consists of a hip belt and a webbing line that together allow for some movement while preventing the pilot from being ejected from the basket during a hard landing.

Further safety equipment may include a first-aid kit, a fire blanket and a strong rescue knife.

=== Occupants ===
At a minimum, the pilot should wear leather or flame-retardant fiber (such as nomex) gloves, so that they may shut off a gas valve in the case of a leak, even if there is a flame present; quick action in this regard can turn a potential catastrophe into a mere inconvenience. The pilot should additionally wear flame-resistant clothing covering their arms and legs; either natural fiber, such as cotton, linen, hemp, or wool, or engineered flame-retardant fiber, such as nomex, is acceptable in this capacity. Most engineered fibers (with the exception of rayon, which is also safe to wear) are thermoplastic; many are also hydrocarbons. This makes such fabrics very much unsuitable to wear near high temperatures, since non-flame-retardant thermoplastics will melt onto the wearer, and most hydrocarbons, whether fibrous or not, are suitable to use as fuels. Natural fiber will singe rather than melt or burn readily, and flame-retardant fiber generally has a very high melting point and is intrinsically non-flammable. Many pilots also advise their passengers to wear similar protective clothing that covers their arms and legs, as well as strong shoes or boots that offer good ankle support. Finally, some balloon systems, especially those that hang the burner from the envelope instead of supporting it rigidly from the basket, require the use of helmets by the pilot and passengers.

=== Ground crew ===
The ground crew should wear gloves whenever there is a possibility of handling ropes or lines. The mass and exposed surface to air movement of a medium-sized balloon is sufficient to cause rope friction burns to the hands of anyone trying to stop or prevent movement. The ground crew should also wear sturdy shoes and at least long pants in case of the need to access a landing or landed balloon in rough or overgrown terrain.

== Maintenance and repair ==
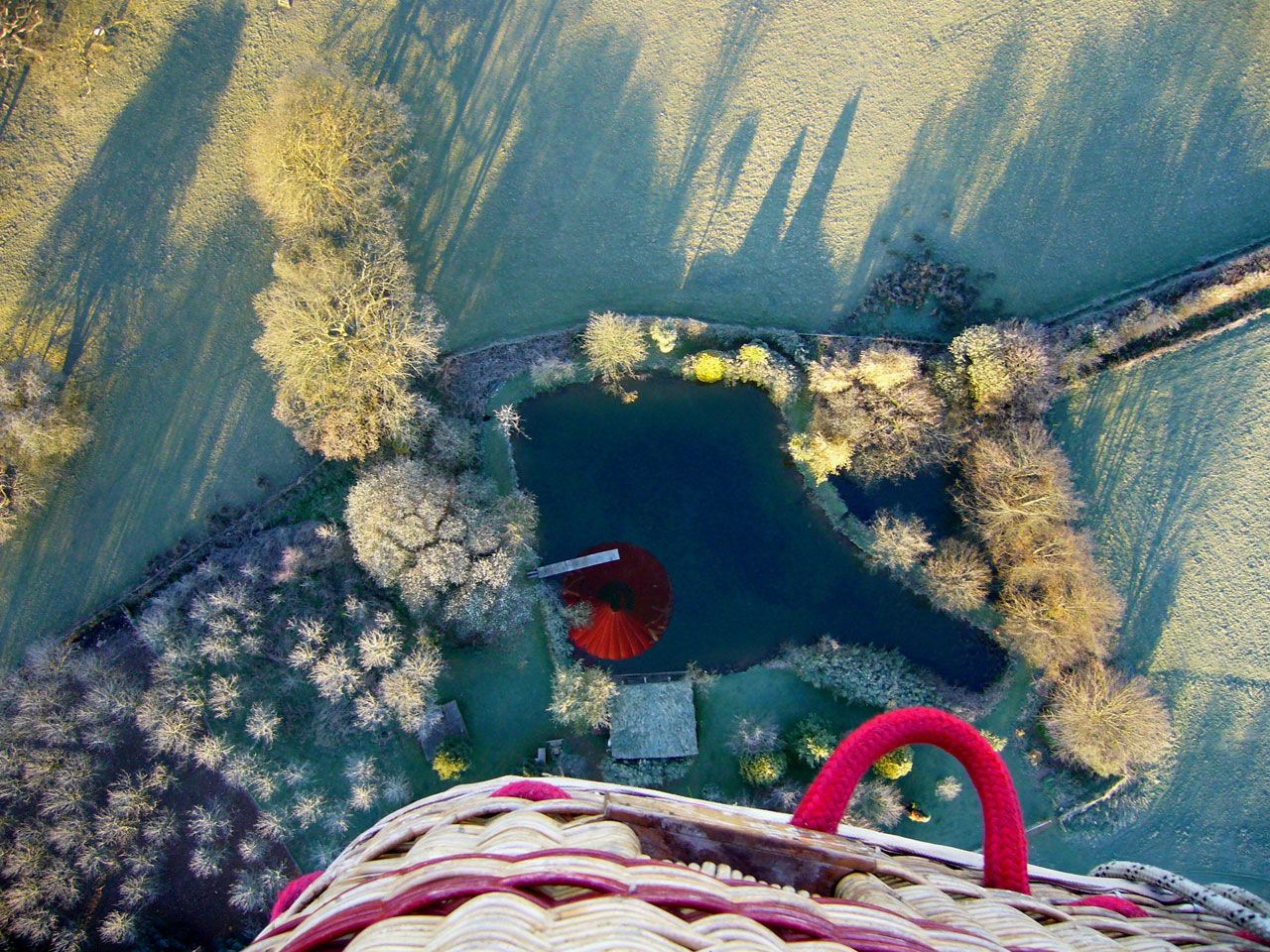
Taken from the basket, the reflection of the balloon can be seen in the lake below. Obstacles in the landscape can inhibit smooth retrieval of the balloon upon landing.

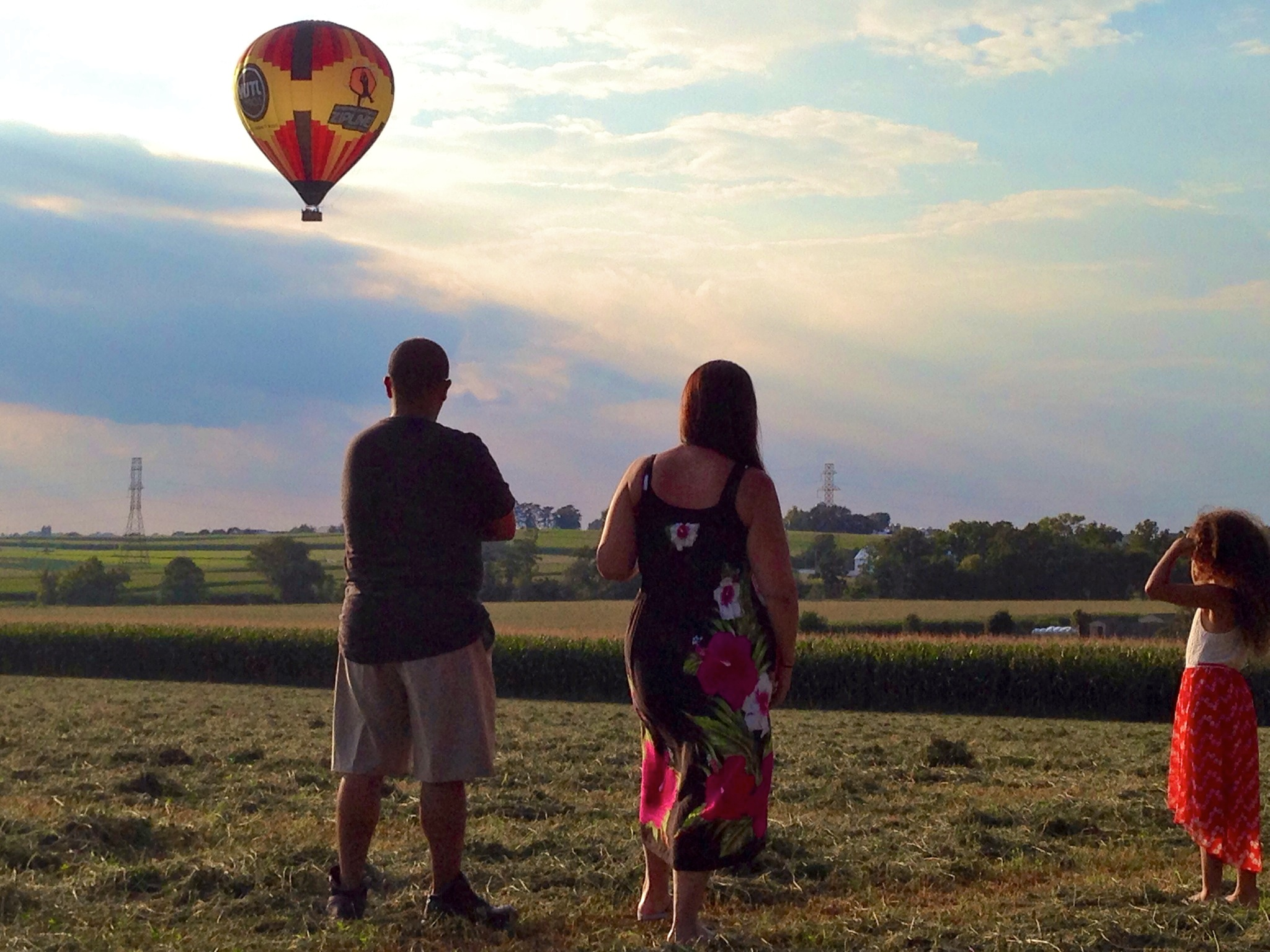
A commercial balloon ride approaching its landing site at Bird-in-Hand, Pennsylvania

As with aircraft, hot air balloons require regular maintenance to remain airworthy. As aircraft made of fabric and that lack direct horizontal control, hot air balloons may occasionally require repairs to rips or snags. While some operations, such as cleaning and drying, may be performed by the owner or pilot, other operations, such as sewing, must be performed by a qualified repair technician and recorded in the balloon's maintenance log book.

=== Maintenance ===
To ensure long life and safe operation, the envelope should be kept clean and dry. This prevents mold and mildew from forming on the fabric and abrasion from occurring during packing, transport, and unpacking due to contact with foreign particles. In the event of a landing in a wet (because of precipitation or early morning or late evening dew) or muddy location (farmer's field), the envelope should be cleaned and laid out or hung to dry.

The burner and fuel system must also be kept clean to ensure safe operation on demand. Damaged fuel hoses need to be replaced. Stuck or leaky valves must be repaired or replaced. The wicker basket may require occasional refinishing or repair. The skids on its bottom may require occasional replacement.

Balloons in most parts of the world are maintained in accordance with a fixed manufacturer's maintenance schedule that includes regular (100 flight hours or 12 month) inspections, in addition to maintenance work to correct any damage. In Australia, balloons used for carrying commercial passengers must be inspected and maintained by approved workshops.

=== Repair ===
In the case of a snag, burn, or rip in the envelope fabric, a patch may be applied or the affected panel completely replaced. Patches may be held in place with glue, tape, stitching, or a combination of these techniques. Replacing an entire panel requires the stitching around the old panel to be removed, and a new panel to be sewn in with the appropriate technique, thread, and stitch pattern.

== Licensing ==
Depending on the size of the balloon, location, and intended use, hot air balloons and their pilots need to comply with a variety of regulations.

=== Balloons ===
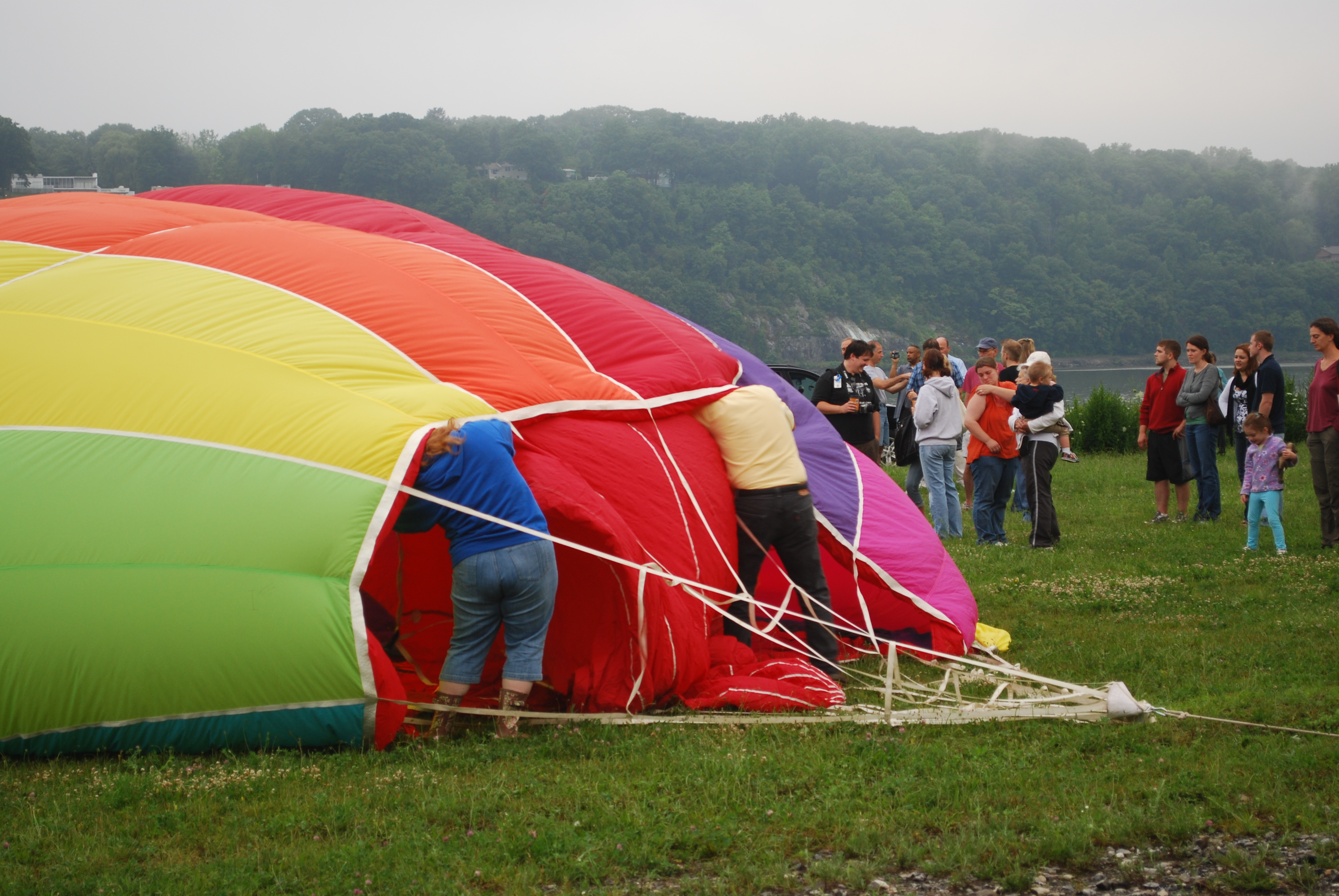
Top of balloon during inflation. Crew is securing parachute vent.

As with other aircraft in the US, balloons must be registered (have an N-number), have an airworthiness certificate, and pass annual inspections. Balloons below a certain size (empty weight of less than 155 pounds or 70 kg including envelope, basket, burners and empty fuel tanks) can be used as an ultralight aircraft.

=== Pilots ===
==== In Australia ====
In Australia, private balloon pilots are managed by the Australian Ballooning Federation and typically become members of regional hot air ballooning clubs. Commercial operations carrying fare paying passengers or charging for promotional flights must operate under an Air Operators Certificate from the Australian Civil Aviation and Safety Authority (CASA) with a nominated Chief Pilot. Pilots must have different degrees of experience before they are allowed to progress to larger balloons. Hot air balloons must be registered aircraft with CASA and are subject to regular airworthiness checks by authorised personnel.

==== In the UK ====
In the UK, the person in command must hold a valid Private Pilot's Licence issued by the Civil Aviation Authority specifically for ballooning; this is known as the PPL(B). There are two types of commercial balloon licences: CPL(B) Restricted and CPL(B) (Full). The CPL(B) Restricted is required if the pilot is undertaking work for a sponsor or being paid by an external agent to operate a balloon. The pilot can fly a sponsored balloon with everything paid for with a PPL unless asked to attend any event. Then a CPL(B) Restricted is required. The CPL(B) is required if the pilot is flying passengers for money. The balloon then needs a transport category C of A (certificate of air worthiness). If the pilot is only flying sponsor's guests and not charging money for flying other passengers, then the pilot is exempted from holding an AOC (air operator's certificate) though a copy of it is required. For passenger flying the balloon also requires a maintenance log.

==== In the United States ====
In the United States, a pilot of a hot air balloon must have a pilot certificate from the Federal Aviation Administration (FAA), carrying the rating of "Lighter-than-air free balloon", and unless the pilot is also qualified to fly gas balloons, will also carry this limitation: "Limited to hot-air balloons with airborne heater". A pilot does not need a license to fly an ultralight aircraft, but training is highly advised, and some hot-air balloons meet the criteria.

To carry paying passengers for hire (and attend some balloon festivals), a pilot must have a commercial pilot certificate. Commercial hot air balloon pilots may also act as hot air balloon flight instructors. While most balloon pilots fly for the pure joy of floating through the air, many are able to make a living as a professional balloon pilot. Some professional pilots fly commercial passenger sightseeing flights, while others fly corporate advertising balloons.

== Accidents and incidents ==
- 1989 Alice Springs hot air balloon crash: On 13 August 1989, two hot air balloons collided at Alice Springs, Northern Territory, Australia, causing one to fall, killing all 13 people on board.
- 2011 Somerset hot air balloon crash: On 1 January 2011, a hot air balloon attempting a high-altitude flight crashed at Pratten's Bowls Club in Westfield, Somerset, near Bath, England, killing both people on board.
- 2012 Carterton hot air balloon crash: On 7 January 2012, a hot air balloon collided with a power line, caught fire and crashed at Carterton, North Island, New Zealand, killing all 11 people on board.
- 2012 Ljubljana Marshes hot air balloon crash: On 23 August 2012, a storm blew a hot air balloon to the ground, causing it to catch fire on impact near Ljubljana, Slovenia. The crash killed 6 of the 32 people on board, and injured the other 26.
- 2013 Luxor hot air balloon crash: On 26 February 2013, a hot air balloon carrying foreign tourists ignited and crashed near the ancient city of Luxor, Egypt, killing 19 of the 21 people on board, making it the deadliest balloon accident in history.
- 2016 Lockhart hot air balloon crash: On 30 July 2016, a hot air balloon carrying 16 people caught fire and crashed near Lockhart, Texas. There were no survivors.
- 2021 Albuquerque hot air balloon crash: On 26 June 2021, a hot air balloon carrying five people made contact with a power line and crashed in Albuquerque, New Mexico. All five people on board died as a result of the accident.
- On 14 January 2024, a hot air balloon crashed outside Eloy, Arizona, killing the three passengers and pilot. Eight skydivers had exited the balloon immediately prior to the incident.
- 2025 Santa Catarina hot air balloon crash: On 21 June 2025, a hot air balloon crashed after catching fire in Praia Grande, Santa Catarina, Brazil, killing 8 of the 21 people on board.

== Manufacturers ==
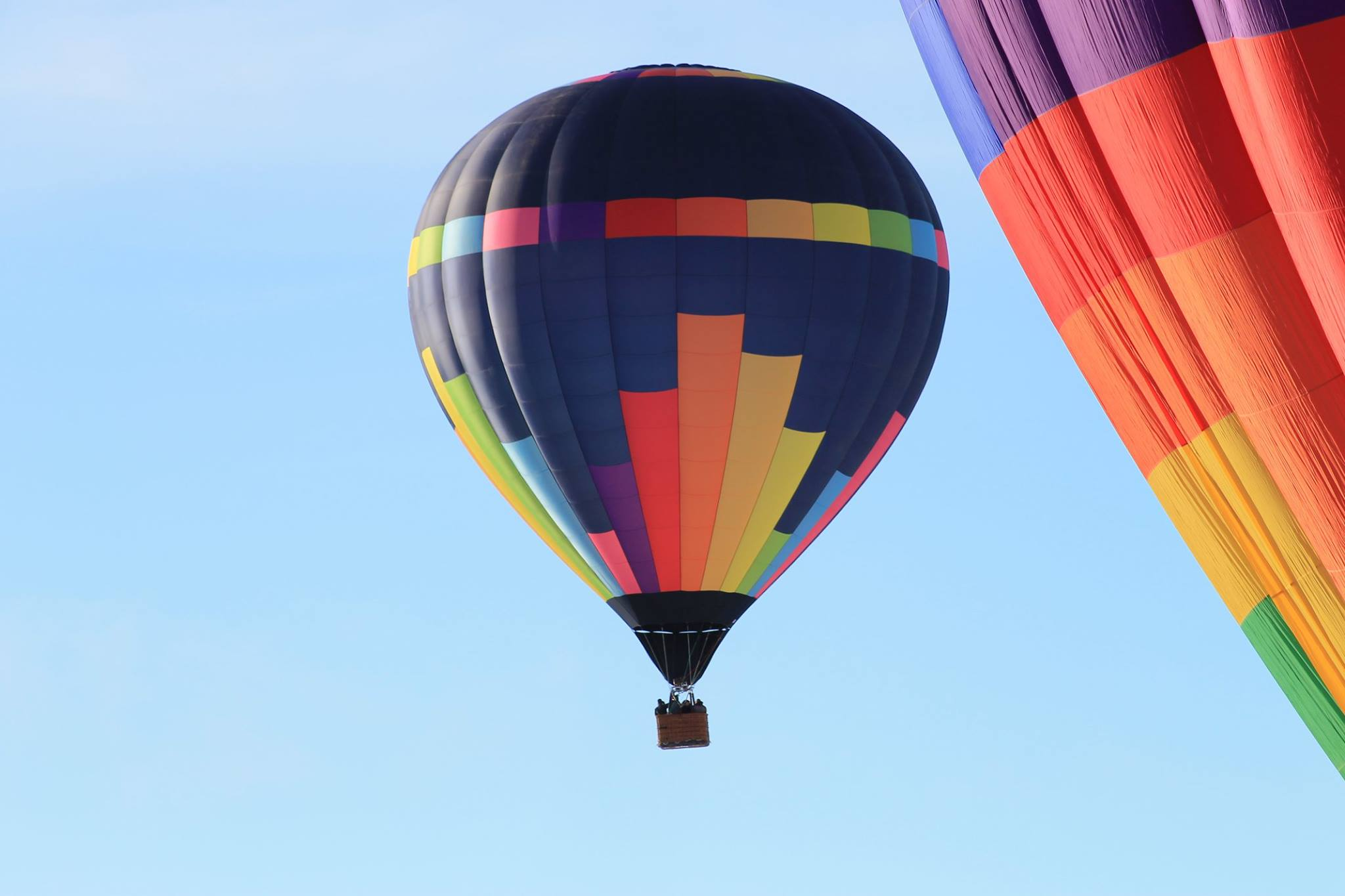
New 2017 Cameron hot air balloon in flight

The largest manufacturer of hot air balloons is Cameron Balloons of Bristol, England, which also owns Lindstrand Balloons of Oswestry, England. Cameron Balloons, Lindstrand Balloons and another English balloon manufacturing company Thunder and Colt (since acquired by Cameron) have been innovators and developers of special shaped balloons. These hot-air balloons use the same principle of lift as conventional inverted teardrop-shaped balloons, but often sections of the special balloon envelope shape do not contribute to the balloon's ability to stay aloft.

The second largest manufacturer of hot air balloons is Ultramagic company, based in Spain, which produces from 80 to 120 balloons per year. Ultramagic can produce very large balloons, such as the N-500 that accommodates as many as 27 persons in the basket, and has also produced many balloons with special shapes, as well as cold-air inflatables.

One of the three largest companies in the world is Kubicek Balloons. From its factory in Brno, Czechia the company ships its products worldwide. Produces from 100 to 115 balloons per year. Kubicek company also focus on special shape balloons, FAA/EASA type certified and are delivered with a Standard Airworthiness Certificate.

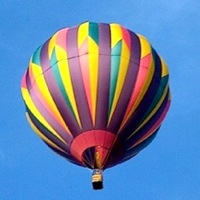
One of the last Aerostar International, Inc. RX8 balloons

In the US Aerostar International, Inc. of Sioux Falls, South Dakota was North America's largest balloon manufacturer and a close second in world manufacturing before ceasing to build balloons in January 2007. The oldest U.S. certified manufacturer is now Adams Balloons out of Albuquerque, New Mexico. Firefly Balloons, formerly The Balloon Works, is a manufacturer of hot air balloons in Statesville, North Carolina. Another manufacturer is Head Balloons, Inc. of Helen, Georgia.

The major manufacturers in Canada are Sundance Balloons and Fantasy Sky Promotions. Other manufacturers include Kavanagh Balloons of Australia, Schroeder Fire Balloons of Germany, Kubicek Balloons of the Czech Republic, and LLopis Balloons of France.

== See also ==
- Aerostat
- Barrage balloon
- Blimp
- Cluster ballooning
- Espionage balloon
- Gas balloon
- High-altitude balloon
- History of military ballooning
- Hot air balloon festival
- Hot air ballooning
- Observation balloon
- Research balloon
- Skyhook balloon
