= Per Lindstrand =

Swedish aeronautical engineer, pilot and entrepreneur (born 1948)

Per Lindstrand (born 8 September 1948) is a Swedish aeronautical engineer, pilot, adventurer, and entrepreneur. He is known for his series of record-breaking trans-oceanic hot air balloon flights and attempts to be the first to fly a Rozière balloon around the Earth – all with British entrepreneur Sir Richard Branson. He is also the founder of Lindstrand Balloons, a hot air balloon manufacturer based in Oswestry, England.

== Early life ==
Lindstrand's aeronautical career began in the Swedish Air Force where he was an Engineering Officer. His first balloon flight in the early 1970s was the result of a bet. He built a makeshift balloon and flew it across the runway while in the Swedish Air Force to claim victory. (When he flew more conventional military aircraft, he chose to use call sign, Polar Per.)

Lindstrand later gained a master's degree in aeronautical engineering and worked for Saab Aircraft in Sweden, and Lockheed in the United States.

== Company history ==
With Swedish aircraft engineer and entrepreneur, Håkan Colting, he formed Colting Balloons which operated in Ireland from 1976. In 1978 the company moved to Oswestry, England, to be closer to major markets in the UK and Europe. When Håkan Colting moved to Canada, Lindstrand continued to run the renamed Colt Balloons (later Thunder & Colt Balloons after acquiring UK-based Thunder Balloons).

In December 1991 Lindstrand founded Lindstrand Balloons Ltd. and later created a specialized aerospace company, Lindstrand Technologies Ltd. (both based in Oswestry) to manufacture and repair aerostats, airships, gas balloons, passenger-carrying tethered aerostats and other fabric engineering products including architectural structures, innovative fire-safety devices for road tunnels and inflatable flood defence barriers. In 2002, Lindstrand Balloons was asked to manufacture the complex parachute for the Mars lander, Beagle 2. Beagle 2 was launched in June 2003, but supposedly failed to land successfully on the Planet Mars on Christmas Day 2003. However, in January 2015 it was located on the surface of Mars in a series of images from NASA's Mars Reconnaissance Orbiter HiRISE camera. The images suggest that it landed safely, but two of the spacecraft's four solar panels failed to deploy, blocking the spacecraft's communications antenna.

Lindstrand Balloons, in partnership with Daimler Chrysler Aerospace of Germany, was awarded a design contract by the European Space Agency to develop a high altitude long endurance airship for possible use in the telecommunications market. Resulting from this, Lindstrand was awarded the German-based Korber Prize for engineering excellence.

== Record flights ==
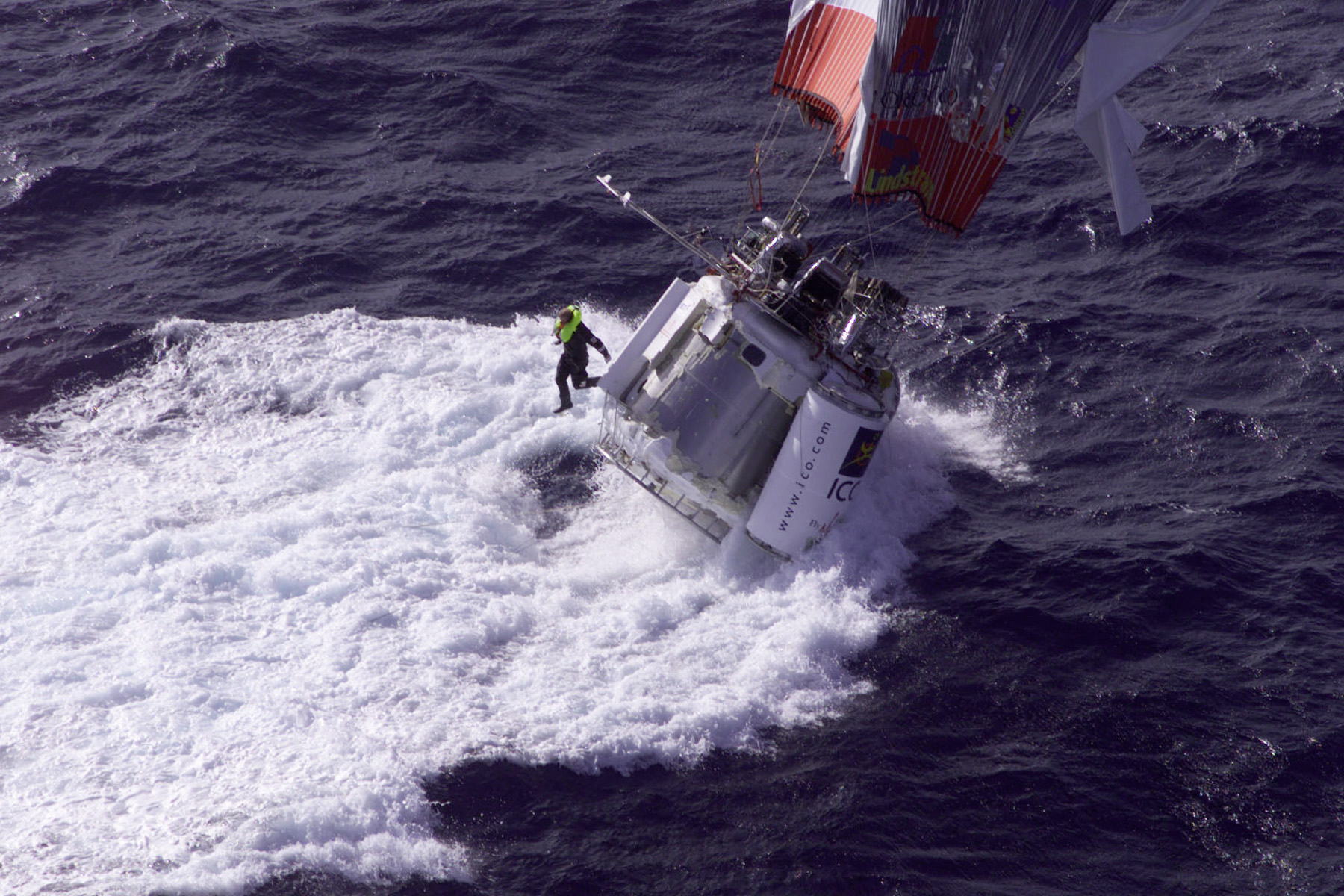
A 1998 attempt at an around-the-world balloon flight by Branson, Fossett, and Lindstrand ends in the Pacific Ocean on 25 December 1998.

From early in his business career, Lindstrand's main interest and ambition lay in pushing the boundaries of lighter-than-air technology and he subsequently captured every absolute world record for hot air balloon flight.

Ascending from Plano, Texas, US on 6 June 1988, Lindstrand set a new world altitude record for hot-air balloons, reaching 19,811 meters (64,997 feet). The record stood until 26 November 2005, when Vijaypat Singhania exceeded it.

In January 1991, in the Virgin Pacific Flyer (a hot air balloon measuring 74,000 m³ (2,600,300 ft³), designed and built by Thunder & Colt), Lindstrand and Branson completed the longest flight in lighter-than-air history when they flew 6761 miles from Japan to Northern Canada. Their flight set two new world records for distance and duration and they broke their own ground speed record, recording 245 mph (395 km/h). The Virgin Pacific Flyer still remains the largest hot air balloon ever built.

In an attempt to be the first to fly a balloon of any type around the world, in December 1998, Lindstrand, partnered by Richard Branson and Steve Fossett, flew for seven days and covered over 20,000 km in a Rozière balloon, launching from Morocco and landing in the Pacific Ocean near to rescue services in Hawaii, US.

== Recognition ==
Lindstrand received the Royal Aero Club's Gold Medal from Prince Andrew twice, in 1989 and 1991, and the Royal Aero Club's Britannia Trophy in 1988. He is a recipient of America's highest flying award, the Harmon Trophy, given to him by Vice President Quayle in the White House. In February 2006, he was awarded an Honorary Fellowship by the Royal Institute of British Architects for "his highly innovative work in the field of inflatables and their application to habitable structures". Lindstrand is also in the Guinness Hall of Fame.
