= 2012 Ljubljana Marshes hot air balloon crash =

Aviation accident in Slovenia

Accident
- Date: 23 August 2012
- Summary: Collision with trees and fire on landing
- Site: Ljubljana Marsh, Municipality of Ig, Slovenia; 45.988754°N 14.526944°E

Aircraft
- Aircraft type: Lindstrand LBL 600C
- Registration: S5-OLO
- Occupants: 32
- Passengers: 30
- Crew: 2
- Fatalities: 6
- Injuries: 26
- Survivors: 26

On 23 August 2012, a hot air balloon on a commercial sightseeing flight crashed in stormy weather on the Ljubljana Marsh in central Slovenia, killing 6 of the 32 people on board.

== Accident ==
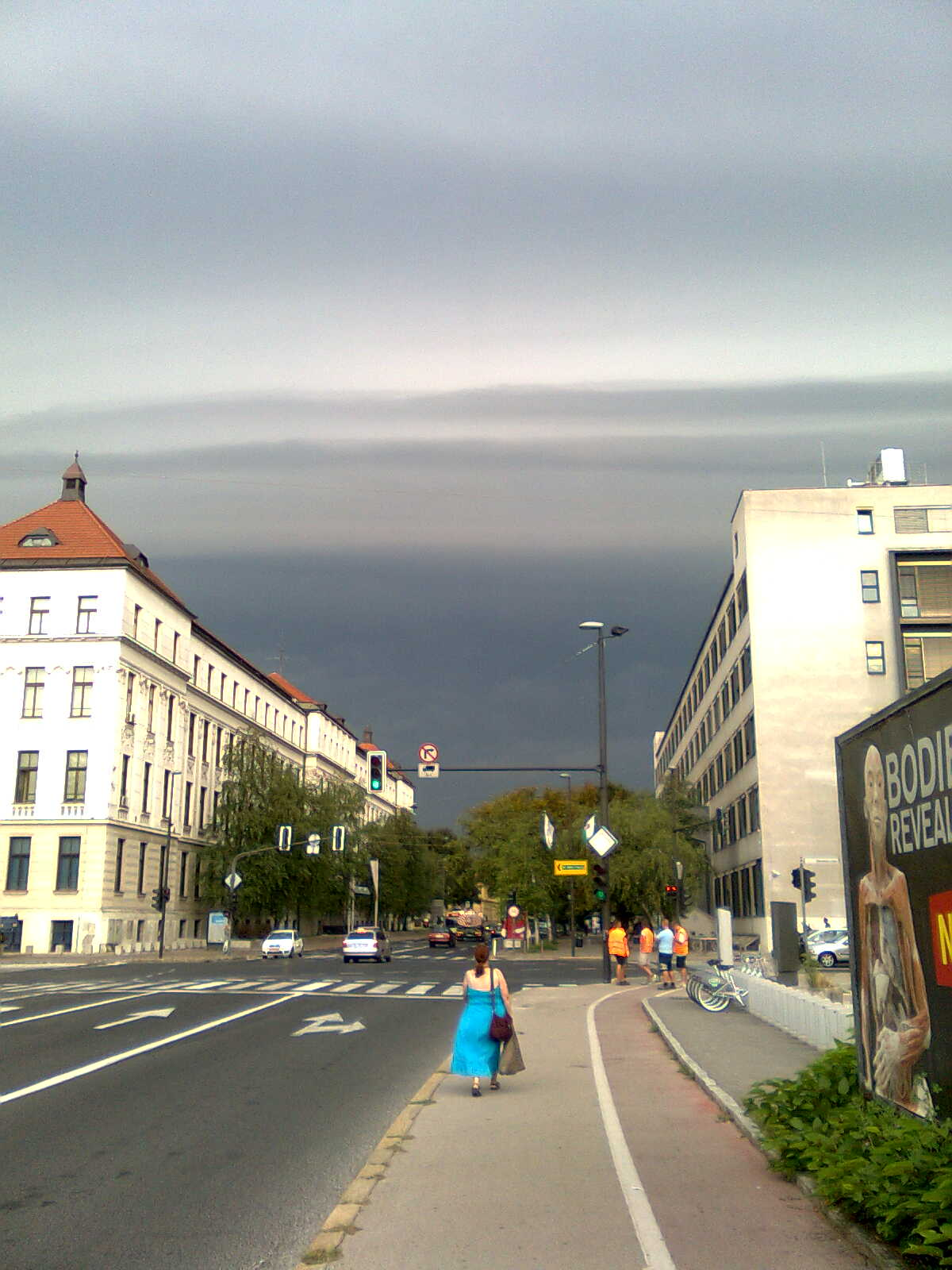
The storm front at the time of the crash, looking northwest from Zois Street in Ljubljana

On 23 August at 7:54 am CEST (05:54 UTC), a hot air balloon carrying 32 passengers, mostly tourists, crashed and caught fire during a thunderstorm on the Ljubljana Marsh, in the Municipality of Ig, 7 km (4 mi) south of Ljubljana. A sudden weather change caused the pilot to try to land immediately. However, the emergency landing was thwarted by wind shear and the balloon hit nearby trees. A fire then broke out.

== Aircraft ==
The balloon was a Lindstrand Balloons LBL 600C. It was the largest balloon in the country and the largest serially manufactured balloon in the world. The basket of the balloon was 5.20 meters (17.1 feet) long and 1.70 metres (5 feet 7 inches) wide, and had four compartments.

== Victims ==
Four people on board were immediately killed during the accident and 28 others were injured. The four dead at the scene were charred beyond recognition. All four were from Ljubljana: a couple, their 11-year-old daughter, and a 56-year-old woman. Ten people had to be resuscitated. All of the survivors, aged from about 10 to about 60 years, received medical care. Two of the injured people were British and another two were Italian citizens. Two of the injured later died: a woman who died two weeks after the accident in Ljubljana, and a 59-year-old man from Ljubljana who died a few days after in Maribor.

== Aftermath ==
On the same day at 7:00 pm, a mass for the dead and injured was held in St. Michael's Church on the Marshes in Črna Vas by Anton Jamnik, the auxiliary Bishop of Ljubljana. It was attended by about 400 people.

Slovene Civil Aviation Agency reported on 27 August 2012 that commercial hot air balloon flights were banned temporarily. The duration of the ban was not given, but the balloon crash was cited as the reason for the ban. Throughout the next year, all involved parties coordinated proposals for stricter rules, which were accepted, and new licenses were granted again starting in August 2013. In the meantime, several operators closed because they were prevented from selling flights, while the remaining ones faced severely reduced sales even after the ban was lifted.

== Investigation and trial ==
The investigation by the Slovenian Aircraft Accident Investigation Commission found that the main cause of the accident was the "improper technique used in operating balloon type LBL 600C in the landing phase." Contributory factors were "insufficient meteorological planning" and lack of consideration for the weather conditions at the time of the flight.

In a preliminary hearing, the pilot denied all these statements, pleading not guilty to the charge of causing general danger. The court trial began in November 2016. Two years later, the district court exonerated the defendant, based on an opinion of a foreign expert.

== See also ==
- List of ballooning accidents
