= History of ballooning =

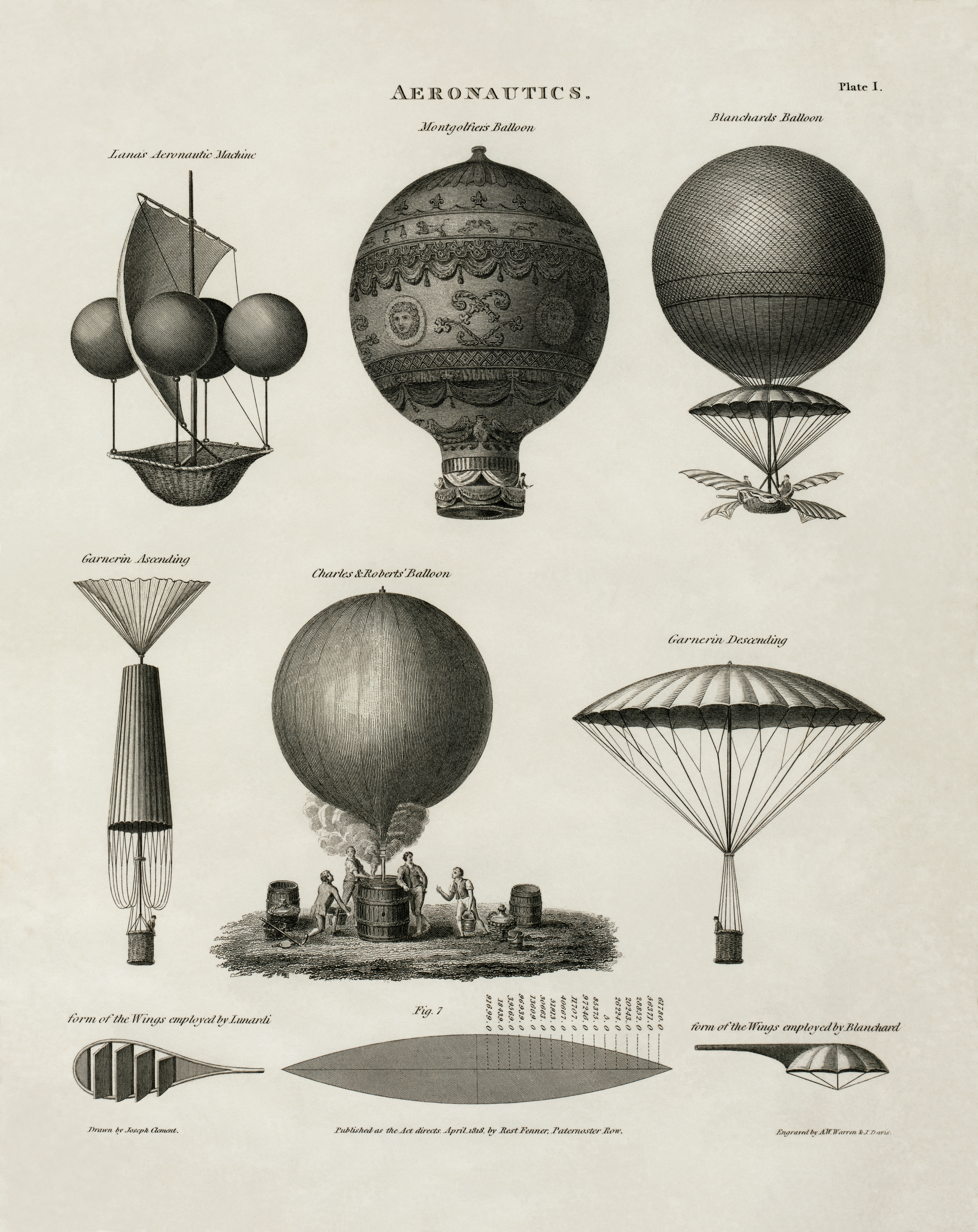
An 1818 technical illustration shows early balloon designs

The history of ballooning, both with hot air and gas, spans many centuries. It includes many firsts, including the first human flight, first flight across the English Channel, first flight in North America, and first aircraft related disaster.

== Premodern and unmanned balloons ==
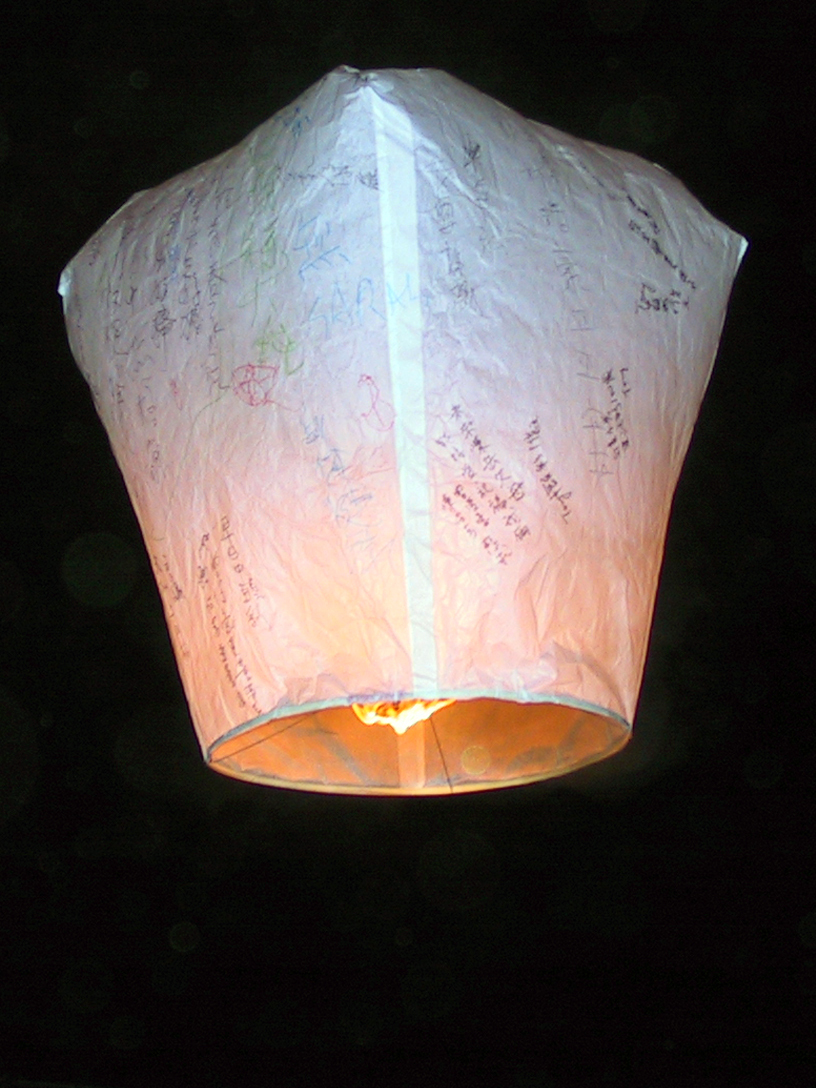
A Kongming lantern, the oldest type of hot air balloon

Unmanned hot air balloons are popular in Chinese history. Zhuge Liang of the Shu Han kingdom, in the Three Kingdoms era (c. AD 220–280) used airborne lanterns for military signaling. These lanterns are known as Chinese lanterns or Kongming lanterns (孔明灯).

While there is no direct documentary or archaeological evidence of any manned or unmanned flights prior to those discussed below occurred using these methods, Ege notes an indirect report of evidence that the Chinese "solved the problem of aerial navigation" using balloons, hundreds of years before the 18th century. The Mongolian army studied Kongming lanterns from China and used them in the Battle of Legnica during the Mongol invasion of Poland. This is the first time ballooning was known in the western world.

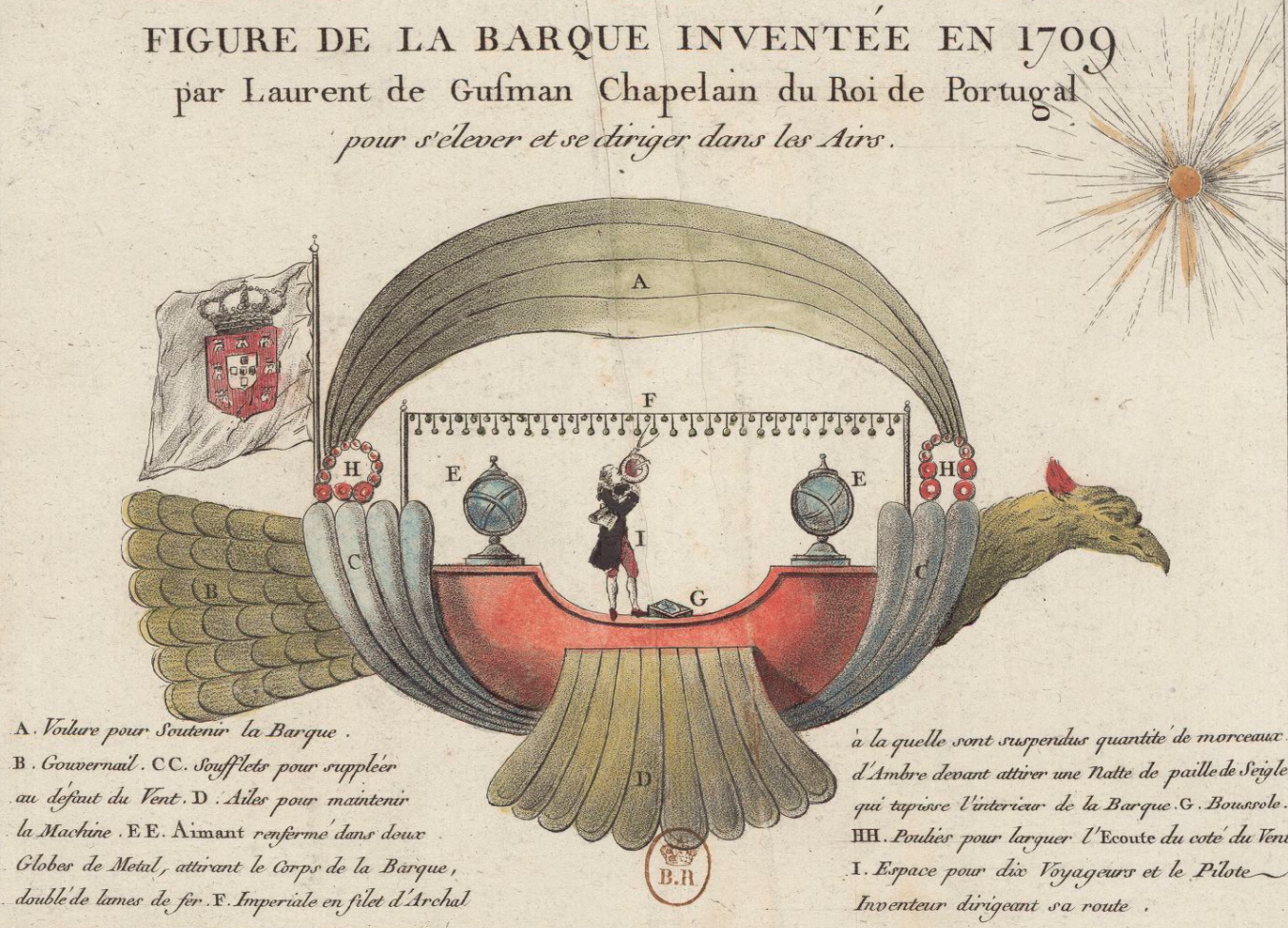
The Passarola, a prototype airship devised by Bartolomeu de Gusmão in 1709

The first documented balloon flight in Europe was by the Brazilian-Portuguese priest Bartolomeu de Gusmão. On 8 August 1709, in Lisbon, Bartolomeu de Gusmão managed to lift a small balloon made of paper full of hot air about four meters in front of king John V and the Portuguese court. He also claimed to have built a balloon named Passarola (Big bird) and attempted to lift himself from Saint George Castle in Lisbon, landing about one kilometre away. However the claim of this feat remains uncertain, even though there is record of this flight in the source used by the FAI (World Air Sports Federation) the exact distance and conditions of the flight are not confirmed.

== First hydrogen balloon ==
Following the publication of Robert Boyle's Law in 1662, and Henry Cavendish's 1766 work on hydrogen, Joseph Black proposed that if the gaseous element filled a balloon, the inflated object could rise up into the air. Jacques Charles, whose study of gases led to his namesake law of volumes, had studied the works of Cavendish, Black, and Tiberius Cavallo, and also thought that hydrogen could lift a balloon.

Jacques Charles designed the balloon, and the Robert brothers constructed a lightweight, airtight gas bag. Barthélémy Faujas de Saint-Fond organized a crowd-funded subscription to finance the brothers' project. The Roberts dissolved rubber in a solution of turpentine, with which they varnished stitched-together sheets of silk, to make the main envelope. They used alternating strips of red and white silk, but the rubberising varnish yellowed the white silk.

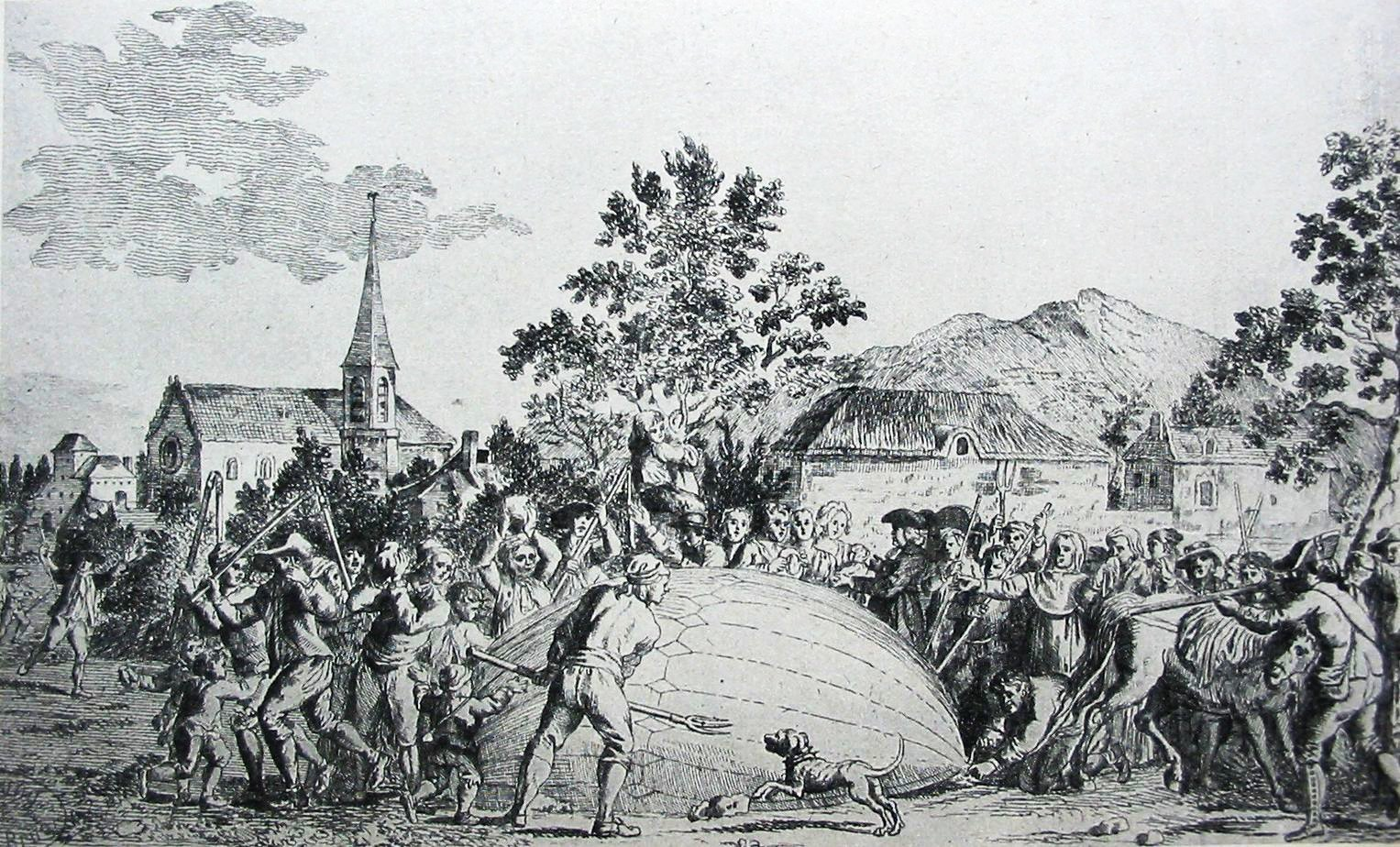
The balloon built by Jacques Charles and the Robert brothers is attacked by terrified villagers in Gonesse.

Jacques Charles and the Robert brothers began filling the world's first hydrogen balloon on 23 August 1783, in the Place des Victoires, Paris. The balloon was comparatively small, a 35-cubic-metre sphere of rubberised silk (about 13 feet in diameter), and only capable of lifting about 9 kg. It was filled with hydrogen that had been made by pouring nearly a quarter of a tonne of sulphuric acid onto half a tonne of scrap iron. The hydrogen gas was fed into the envelope via lead pipes; as it was not passed through cold water, the gas was hot when produced, and then contracted as it cooled in the balloon, causing great difficulty in filling the balloon completely.

Daily progress bulletins were issued on the inflation, attracting a crowd that became so great that on the 26th the balloon was moved secretly by night to the Champ de Mars (now the site of the Eiffel Tower), a distance of 4 kilometres. On 27 August 1783, the balloon was released; Benjamin Franklin was among the crowd of onlookers. The balloon flew northwards for 45 minutes, pursued by chasers on horseback, and landed 21 kilometres away in the village of Gonesse, where the reportedly terrified local peasants attacked it with pitchforks and knives, and destroyed it.

== First unmanned flight ==
On 5 June 1783, the Montgolfier brothers first publicly demonstrated an unmanned hot-air balloon 35 feet (11 m) in diameter. On 19 September 1783, their balloon Aerostat Réveillon was flown with the first (non-human) living creatures in a basket attached to the balloon: a sheep called Montauciel ("Climb-to-the-sky"), a duck and a rooster. The sheep was believed to have a reasonable approximation of human physiology. The duck was expected to be unharmed by being lifted aloft. It was included as a control for effects created by the aircraft rather than the altitude. The rooster was included as a further control as it was a bird that did not fly at high altitudes. This demonstration was performed before a crowd at the royal palace in Versailles, before King Louis XVI and Queen Marie Antoinette. The flight lasted approximately eight minutes, covered two miles (3 km), and obtained an altitude of about 1,500 feet (460 m). The craft landed safely after flying.

== First manned flight ==
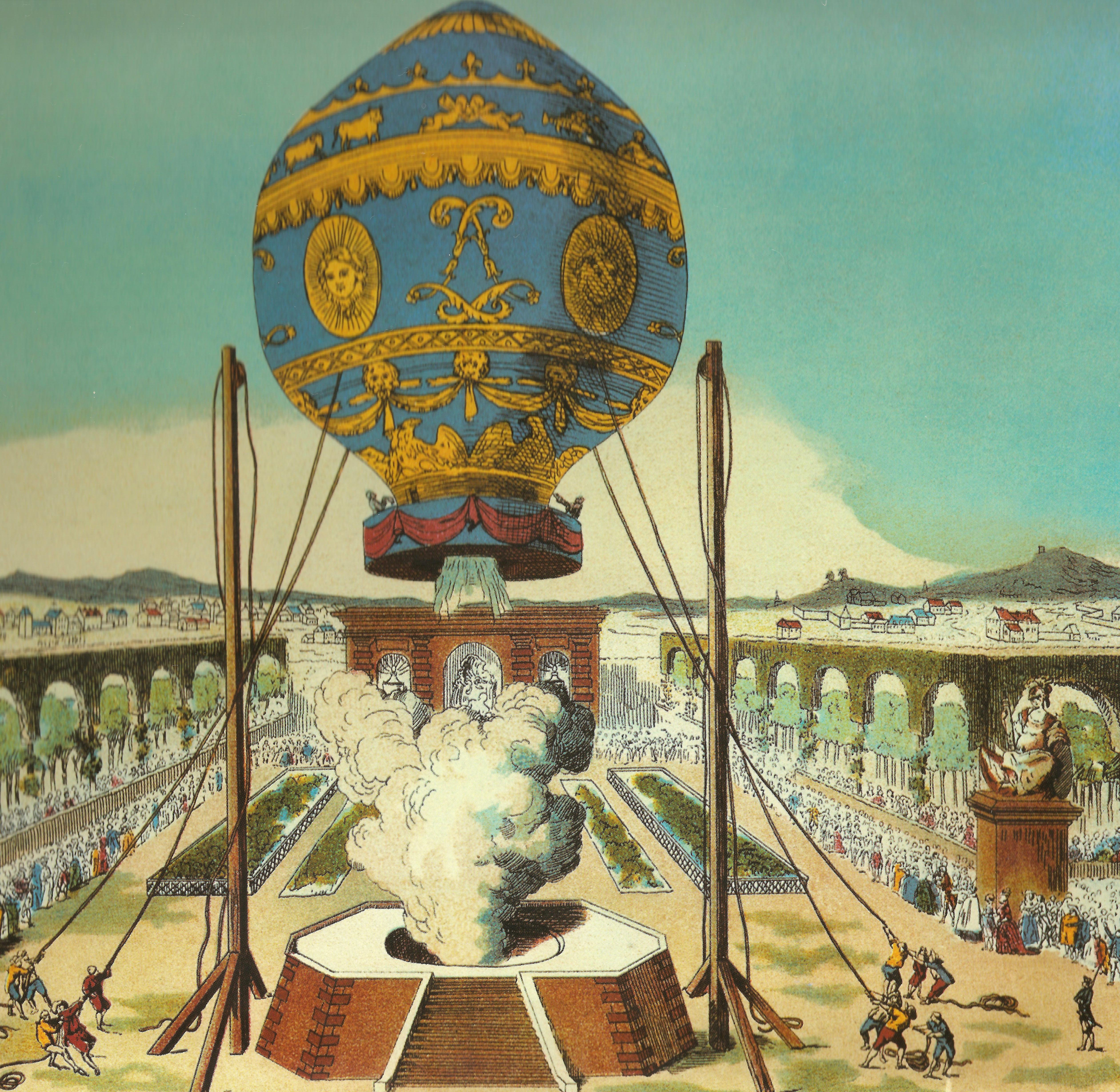
The first manned hot-air balloon, designed by the Montgolfier brothers, takes off from the Bois de Boulogne, Paris, on November 21, 1783.

The first clearly recorded instance of a balloon carrying human passengers used hot air to generate buoyancy and was built by the brothers Joseph-Michel and Jacques-Etienne Montgolfier in Annonay, France. These brothers came from a family of paper manufacturers and had noticed ash rising in paper fires. The Montgolfier brothers gave their first public demonstration of their invention on 4 June 1783. After experimenting with unmanned balloons and flights with animals, the first manned balloon flight took place on 15 October 1783, from the Folie Titon in Paris, piloted by the scientist Jean-François Pilâtre de Rozier with the balloon tethered. The balloon reached a height of 84 feet (approximately 25 metres), the maximum height allowed by the tethering ropes, and stayed aloft for 4 minutes and 25 seconds. Further tethered test flights were carried out on 19 October 1783 with passengers including Giroud de Villette, and the Marquis François d'Arlandes separately accompanying de Rozier.

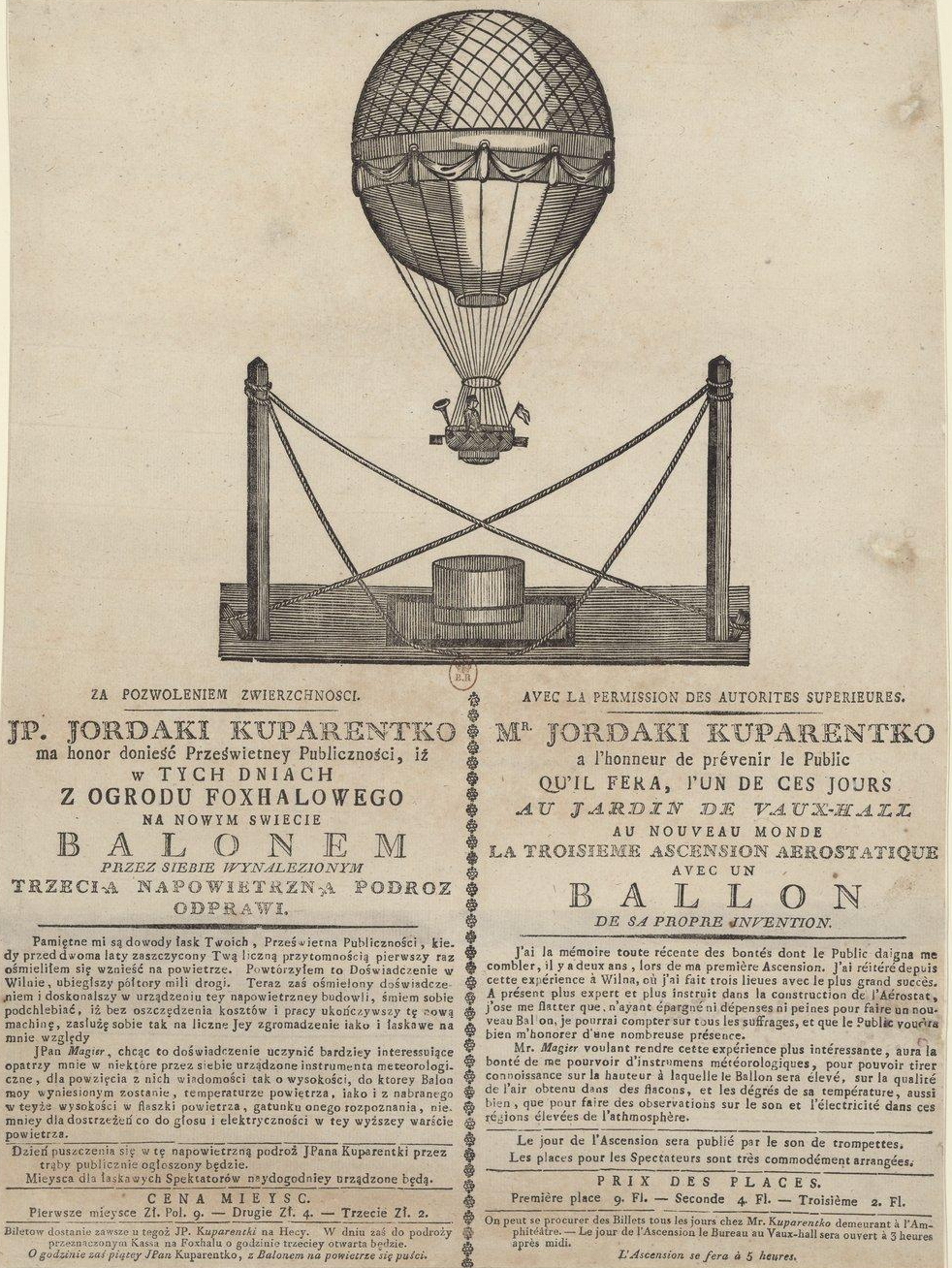
An 1808 poster of Iordache Cuparencu, believed to be the first man to survive an air accident

The first untethered, free flight with human passengers was on 21 November 1783. King Louis XVI had originally decreed that condemned criminals would be the first pilots, but de Rozier, along with d'Arlandes, successfully petitioned for the honor. For this occasion the diameter of the balloon rose to almost 50 feet, with a smoky fire slung under the neck of the balloon placed in an iron basket; it was controllable and replenishable by the balloonists. In 25 minutes the two men traveled just over five miles. Enough fuel remained on board at the end of the flight to have allowed the balloon to fly four to five times as far, but burning embers from the fire threatened to engulf the balloon and the men decided to land as soon as they were over open countryside.

News of the balloon flights spread quickly. By December 1783 Goethe wrote to a friend on Wilhelm Heinrich Sebastian Bucholz's attempt in Weimar "to master the art of Montgolfier". The pioneering work of the Montgolfier brothers in developing the hot air balloon was recognised by this type of balloon being named Montgolfière after them.

== First manned hydrogen balloon flight ==
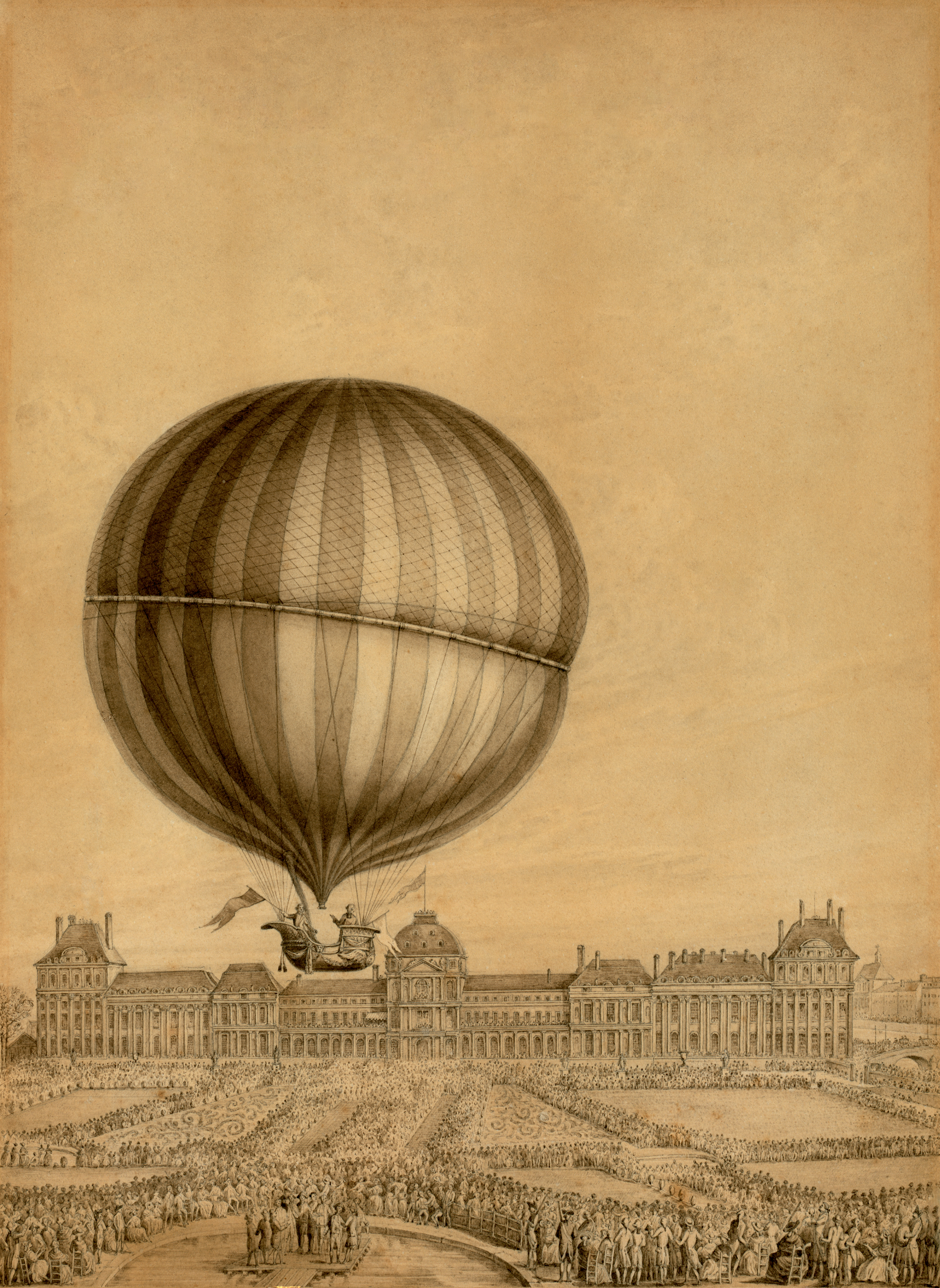
A contemporary illustration of the first flight by Professor Jacques Charles with Nicolas-Louis Robert on December 1, 1783, viewed from the Place de la Concorde to the Tuileries Palace

Only a few days later, at 1:45pm on 1 December 1783, professor Jacques Charles and the Robert brothers (Les Frères Robert) launched a new, manned hydrogen balloon from the Jardin des Tuileries in Paris, amid vast crowds and excitement. The balloon was held on ropes and led to its final launch place by four of the leading noblemen in France, the Marechal de Richelieu, Marshal de Biron, the Bailli de Suffren, and the Duke of Chaulnes. Jacques Charles was accompanied by Nicolas-Louis Robert as co-pilot of the 380-cubic-metre, hydrogen-filled balloon. The envelope was fitted with a hydrogen release valve, and was covered with a net from which the basket was suspended. Sand ballast was used to control altitude. They ascended to a height of about 1,800 feet (550 m) and landed at sunset in Nesles-la-Vallée after a flight of 125 minutes, covering 36 km. The chasers on horseback, who were led by the Duc de Chartres, held down the craft while both Charles and Robert alighted.

Charles then decided to ascend again, but alone this time because the balloon had lost some of its hydrogen. This time he ascended rapidly to an altitude of about 3,000 metres), where he saw the sun again. He began suffering from aching pain in his ears so he 'valved' to release gas, and descended to land gently about 3 km away at Tour du Lay. Unlike the Robert brothers, Charles never flew again, although a gas balloon, using hydrogen or any other cold gas for its lift, came to be called a Charlière in his honour.

Charles and Robert carried a barometer and a thermometer to measure the pressure and the temperature of the air, making this not only the first manned hydrogen balloon flight, but also the first balloon flight to provide meteorological measurements of the atmosphere above the Earth's surface.

It is reported that 400,000 spectators witnessed the launch, and that hundreds had paid one crown each to help finance the construction and receive access to a "special enclosure" for a "close-up view" of the take-off. Among the "special enclosure" crowd was Benjamin Franklin, the diplomatic representative of the United States of America. Also present was Joseph Montgolfier, whom Charles honoured by asking him to release the small, bright green, pilot balloon to assess the wind and weather conditions.

== Further milestones ==
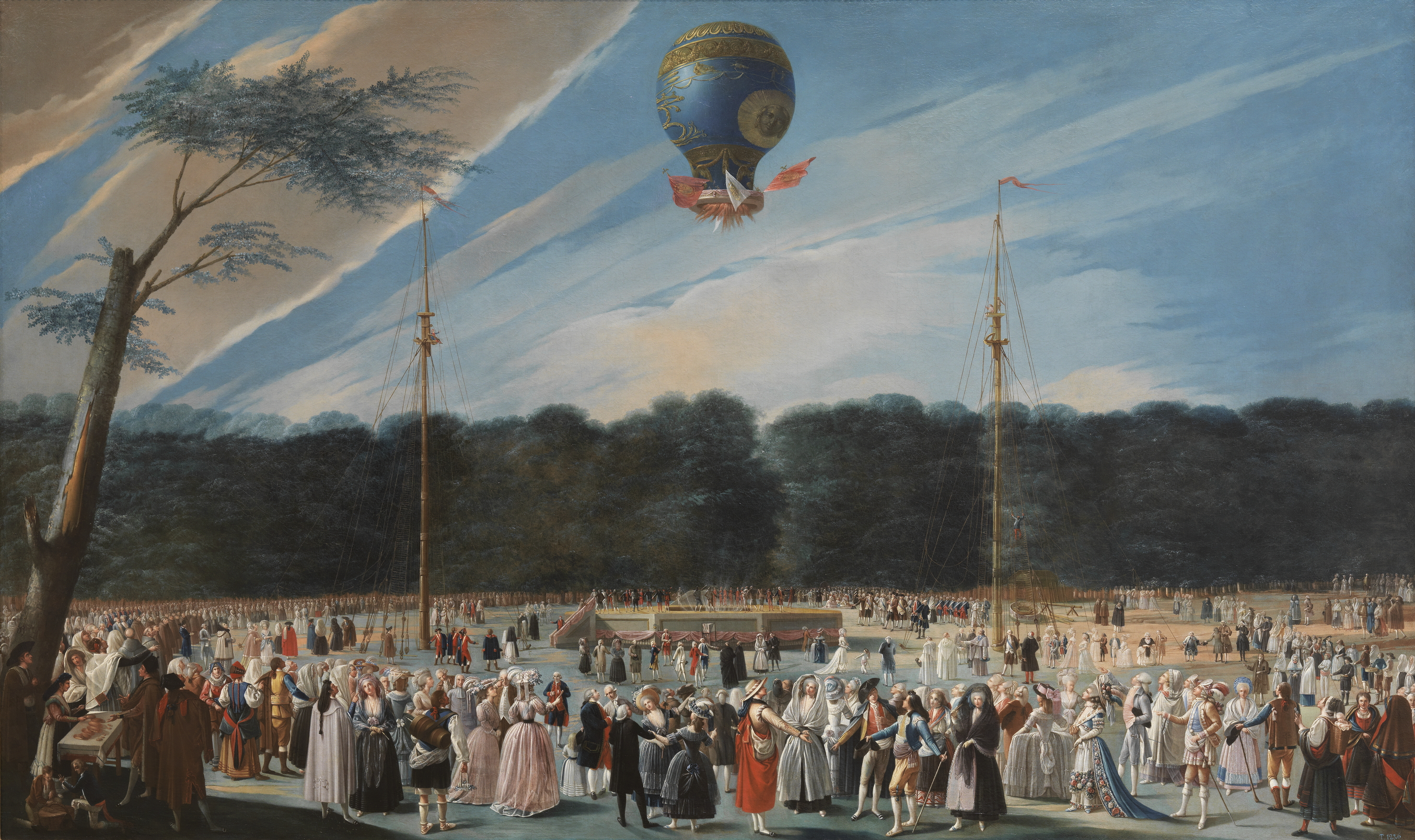
Ascent of the Monsieur Charles Bouché's Montgolfier Balloon in the Gardens of Aranjuez in June 1784

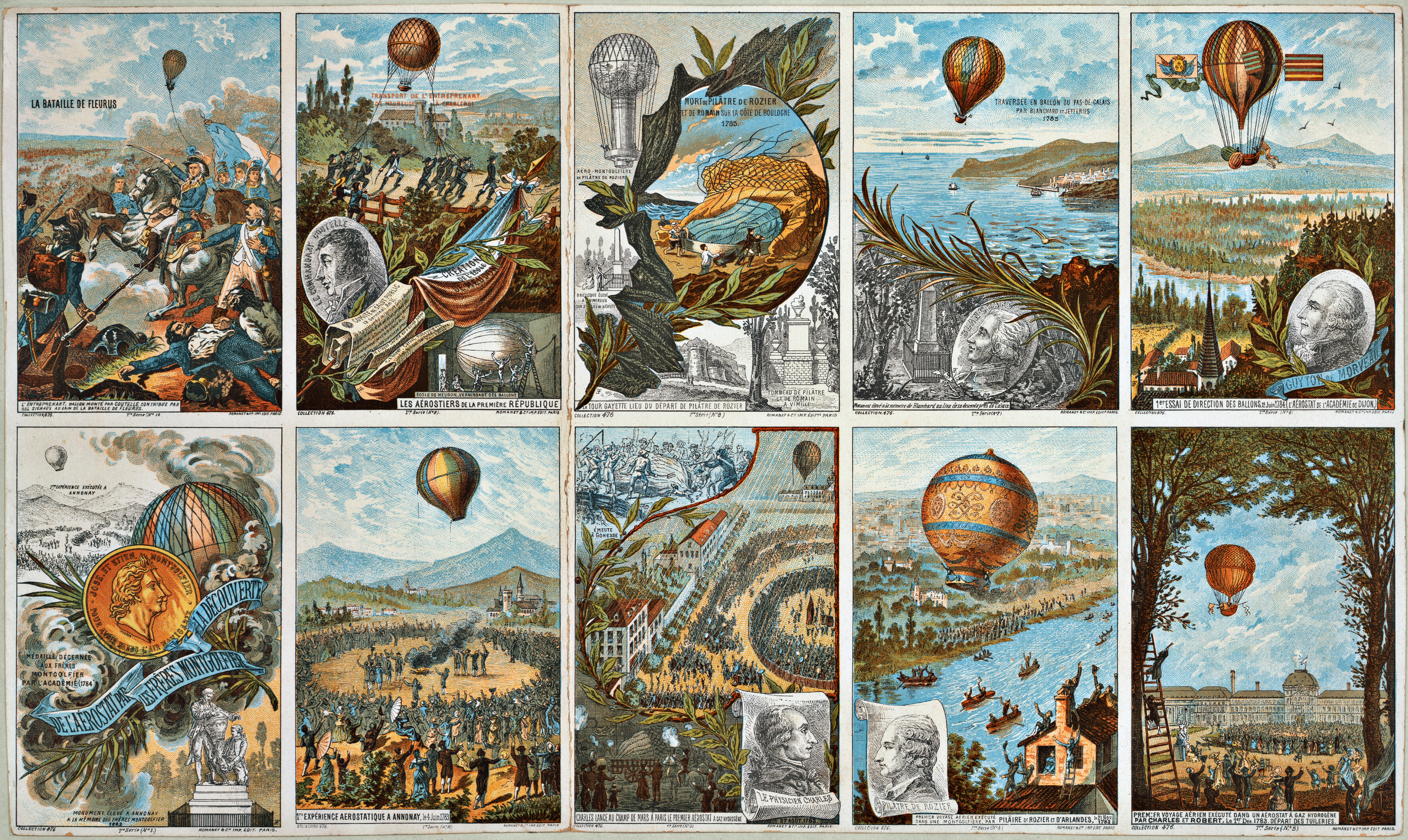
Lithographic prints of balloon pioneers

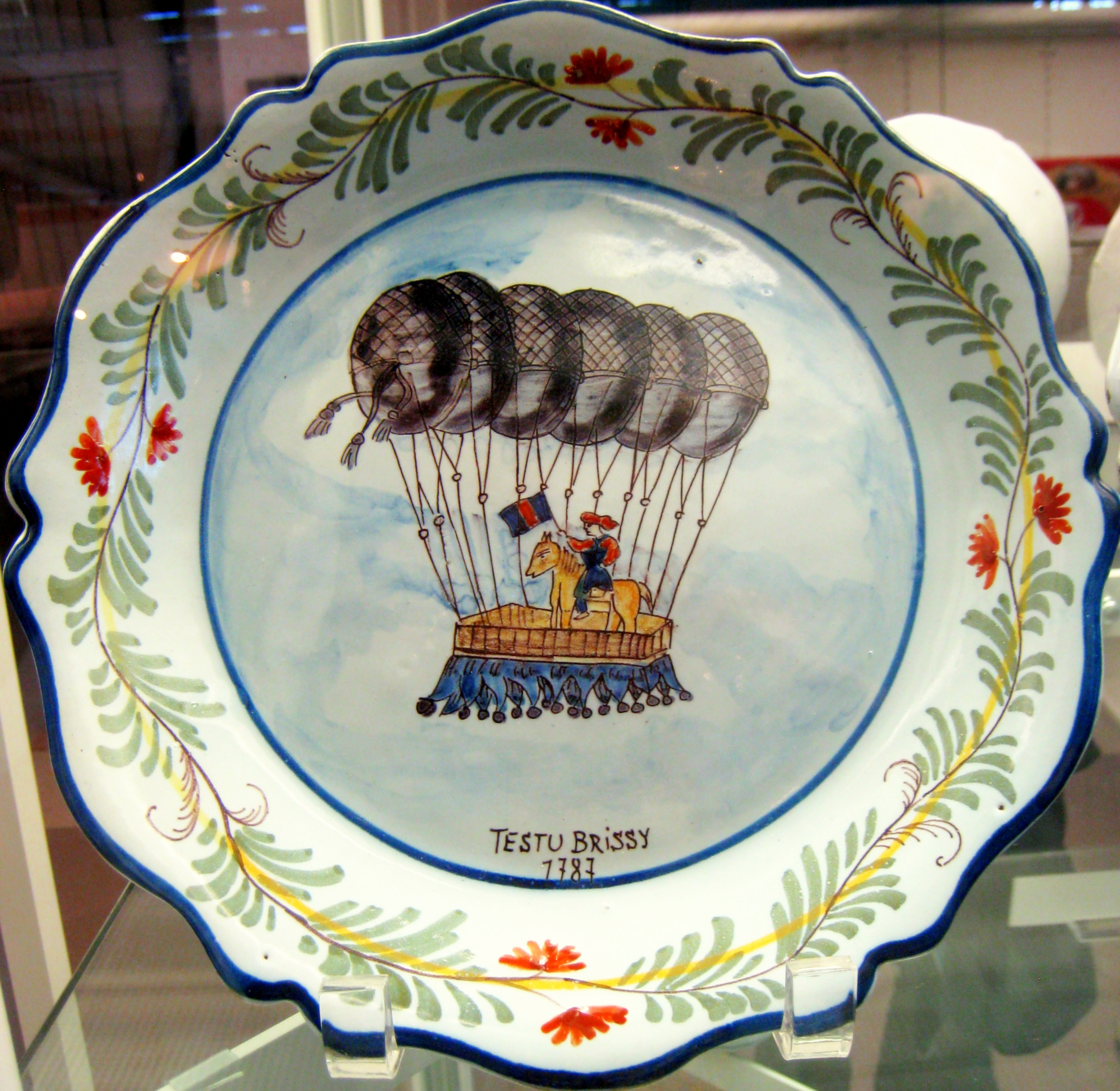
Pierre Testu-Brissy on Air Horse One, c. 1798

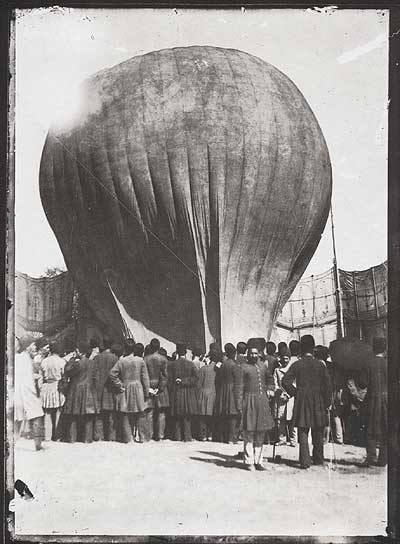
Balloon landing in Mashgh square, Iran (Persia), at the time of Nasser al-Din Shah Qajar, around 1850

The next great challenge was to fly across the English Channel, a feat accomplished on 7 January 1785, by Jean-Pierre Blanchard and Dr. John Jeffries.

The first aircraft disaster occurred in May 1785 when the town of Tullamore, County Offaly, Ireland was seriously damaged when the crash of a balloon resulted in a fire that burned down about 100 houses, making the town home to the world's first aviation disaster. To this day, the town shield depicts a phoenix rising from the ashes.

Blanchard went on to make the first manned flight of a balloon in America on 10 January 1793. His hydrogen-filled balloon took off from a prison yard in Philadelphia, Pennsylvania. The flight reached 5,800 feet (1,770 m) and landed in Deptford Township, New Jersey. President George Washington was among the guests observing the takeoff. Sophie Blanchard, married to Jean-Pierre, was the first woman to pilot her own balloon and the first woman to adopt ballooning as a career.

Gas balloons became the most common type from the 1790s until the 1960s. Pierre Testu-Brissy completed over 50 flights in his lifetime, including the first ascent on horseback on 16 October 1798 from Belleville Park, Paris.

Balloonists sought a means to control the balloon's direction. The first steerable balloon (also known as a dirigible) was flown by Henri Giffard in 1852. Powered by a steam engine, it was too slow to be effective. Like heavier than air flight, the internal combustion engine made dirigibles—especially blimps—practical, starting in the late 19th century. In 1872 Paul Haenlein flew the first (tethered) internal combustion motor-powered balloon. The first to fly in an untethered airship powered by an internal combustion engine was Alberto Santos Dumont in 1898.

On 3 July 2002, Steve Fossett became the first person to fly around the world alone, nonstop, in any kind of aircraft, by hot air balloon. He launched the balloon Spirit of Freedom from Northam, Western Australia, on 19 June 2002 and returned to Australia on 3 July, subsequently landing in Queensland. Duration and distance of this solo balloon flight was 13 days, 8 hours, 33 minutes (14 days 19 hours 50 minutes to landing), 20,626.48 statute miles (33,195.10 km). The trip set a number of records for ballooning: Fastest (200 miles per hour (320 km/h), breaking his own previous record of 166 miles per hour (270 km/h)), Fastest Around the World (13.5 days), Longest Distance Flown Solo in a Balloon (20,482.26 miles (32,963.00 km)), and 24-Hour Balloon Distance (3,186.80 miles (5,128.66 km) on July 1).

== Ballooning in Britain and Ireland ==
The first manned balloon flight in Britain was by James Tytler on 27 August 1784. Tytler flew his balloon from Abbeyhill to Restalrig, then suburbs of Edinburgh. He flew for ten minutes at a height of 350 feet.

The first manned balloon flight in England was by Signor Vincent Lunardi who ascended from Moorfields (London) on 15 September 1784. The first British woman to ascend was Letitia Ann Sage, who ascended in one of Lunardi's balloons in June 1785.

Jean-Pierre Blanchard and Jeffries flew from Dover to Calais in 1785.

In the same year, a Mr Arnold went up from St George's Fields (London), but came down in the River Thames, and a Major John Money (1752–1817) took off from Norwich in an attempt to raise money for the Norfolk and Norwich Hospital. He passed over Lowestoft at 6 p.m. and came down about 18 miles (29 km) into the North Sea; he was saved by a revenue cutter about five hours later.

The first ascent in Ireland was from Ranelagh Gardens in Dublin in 1785 by Richard Crosbie.

James Sadler made many flights in England, but on 9 October 1812 he came down in the sea and was rescued near Holyhead. His son, Windham Sadler, was killed when he fell from a balloon in 1825. Lieutenant Harris was killed falling from a balloon on 25 May 1824.

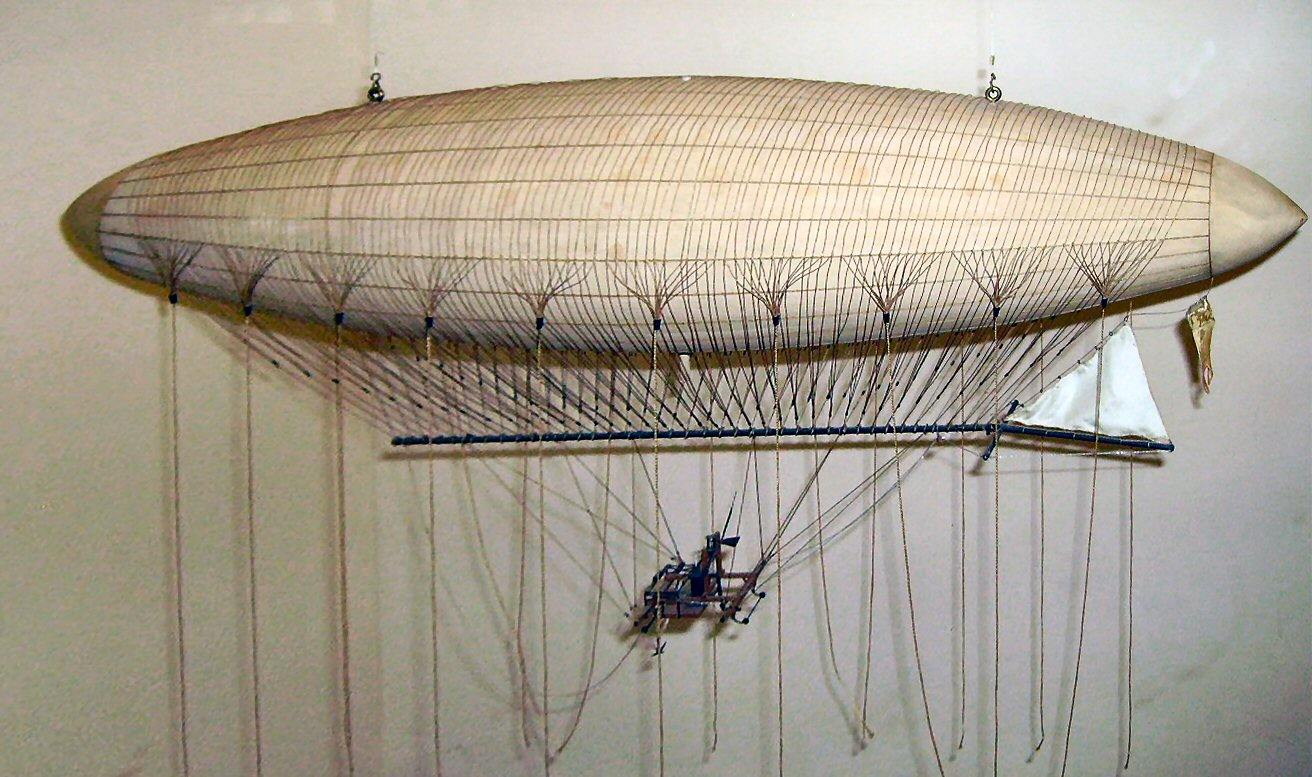
A model of the first dirigible, the 1852 steam-powered Giffard Airship, on display at the London Science Museum

Charles Green and others made a number of ascents in London between 1821 and 1852. His first ascent was on 19 July 1821. He claimed that in May 1828 he actually took his horse up with him but this was disputed, and the public had to wait until July 1850 when he lifted off from Vauxhall Gardens with a somewhat diminutive pony as his "steed". Further attempts were made in France until Madame Poitevin took off from Cremorne Gardens in London in August 1852, as "Europa on a Bull" (the bull dressed as rather a nervous "Zeus"). This event led to a charge of cruelty to animals, a police case, a diplomatic dilemma and general public outrage, after which no animals were used.

In 1836, the "Royal Vauxhall" balloon which was used as a pleasure balloon in Vauxhall Gardens was flown by Charles Green with two crew; after 18 hours it came down safely at Weilburg in the German Duchy of Nassau, setting a record unbeaten until 1907.

Robert Cocking, an artist, devised a parachute based upon Garnerin’s prototype (in which he had great faith) and ascended in a balloon from Vauxhall (London) on 24 July 1837 to about 1,500 metres (4,900 ft). The parachute failed to open properly and Cocking was killed.

== Military use ==
The first military use of aircraft in Europe took place during the French Revolutionary Wars, when the French used a tethered hydrogen balloon to observe the movements of the Austrian army during the Battle of Fleurus (1794). When the French army celebrated its victories in 1798 during the French campaign in Egypt and Syria, the French wanted to demonstrate balloon flight to the people of Cairo, but the flight had to be postponed because the savants had lost their equipment at the Battle of the Nile.

In 1811 Franz Leppich went to Napoleon and claimed that he could build a hydrogen balloon that would enable the French to attack from the air. Napoleon forbade Leppich further experiments and subsequently ordered that he be removed from French territory. In 1812, the Russian secret service got Leppich a passport with the name Schmidt, and he went to Moscow to work under the supervision of Count Rostopchin with the aim of building a dirigible airship to help the Russian army halt Napoleon's invasion. A heavily guarded, high-walled shipyard was secretly set up near Moscow with about 50 other German-speaking mechanics, and Leppich started to build airship prototypes. Leppich's huge inflatable blimp was sewn from thick fabric, attached to a 20-meter wooden platform ringed with gun mounts and compartments for bombs. Its locomotion was to be provided by forty rowers with giant paddles. The airship's development was plagued with problems; the material leaked and the paddles repeatedly broke. When the dirigible was finally tried out, it worked but was unable to move against the wind. By the time Napoleon began the French invasion of Russia in 1812, Leppich's airship was still not ready, and the prototype was destroyed. After the Battle of Borodino, Leppich continued to work on his airship for another year near St. Petersburg, and then he left for Germany again. There he worked on the device until 1817, though it was never used. In 1818 he received a patent in his and his brother's name in Vienna for making nails with a punch.

In Tolstoy's novel, War and Peace, Count Pyótr Kiríllovich Bezúkhov (Pierre) makes an excursion to see this balloon, though he does not see it. Tolstoy also includes a letter from the sovereign Emperor Alexander I to Count Fyodor Rostopchin concerning the balloon.

French Emperor Napoleon III employed a corps of observation balloons, led by Eugène Godard, for aerial reconnaissance over battlefields both in Franco-Austrian war of 1859, and in 1870 during the Franco-Prussian War and the Siege of Paris.

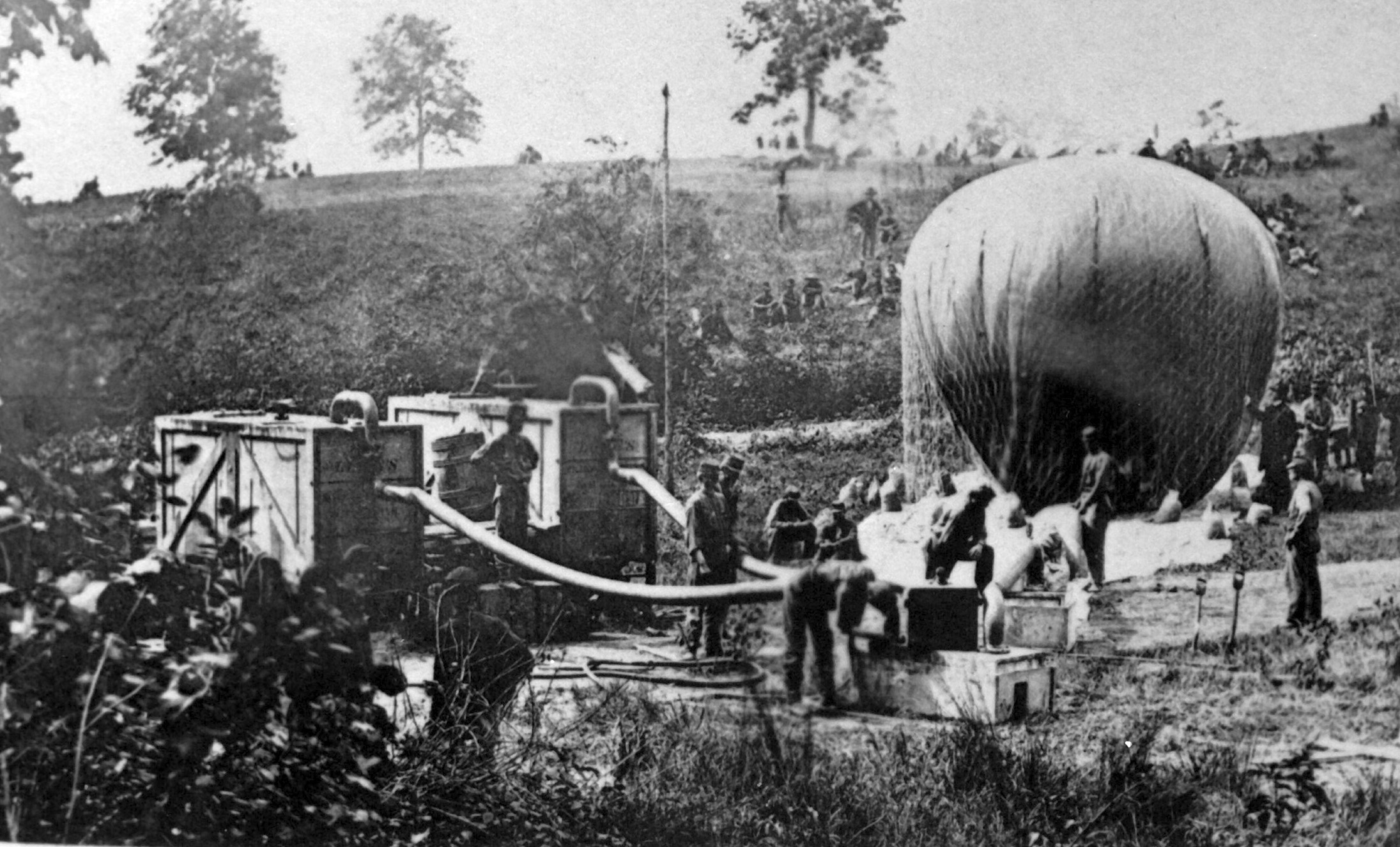
The Union Army Balloon Intrepid being inflated from the gas generators for the Battle of Fair Oaks

Hot air balloons were employed during the American Civil War. The military balloons used by the Union Army Balloon Corps under the command of Prof. Thaddeus S. C. Lowe were limp silk envelopes inflated with coal gas (town gas) or hydrogen.

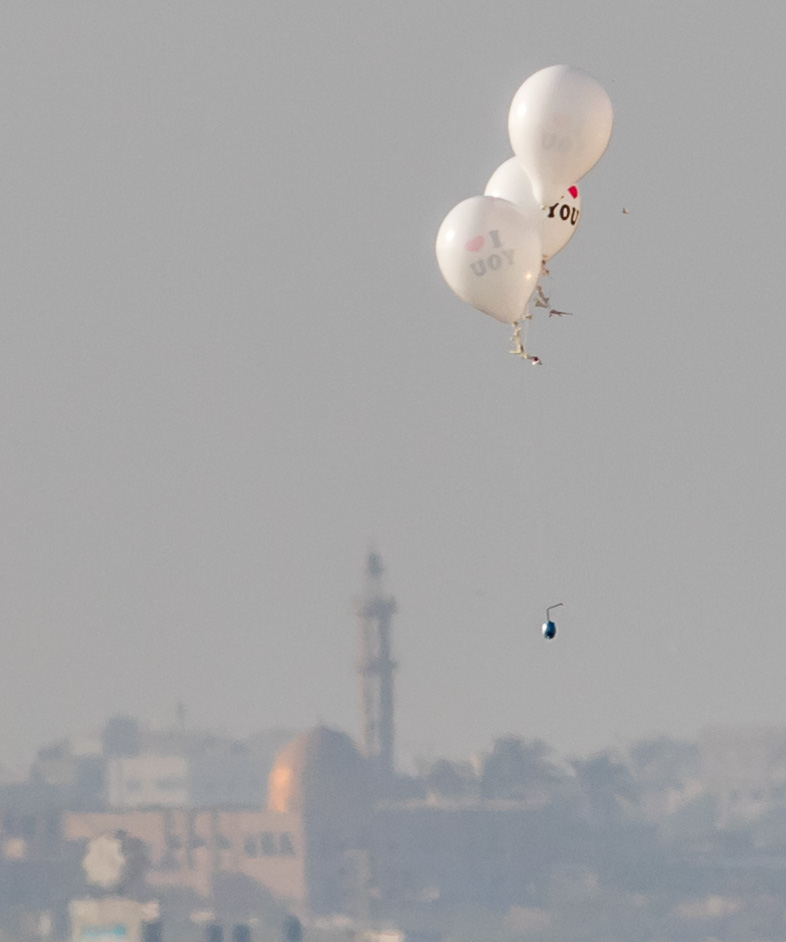
Helium party balloons bearing flammable materials launched from Bureij, Gaza Strip

Since the 2018 Gaza border protests, Palestinian militants have been launching incendiary balloons at Israel Since the beginning of May 2018, helium-filled incendiary balloons have been used alongside the kites. On 25 August 2026 during the Gaza war, Israel warned Hamas that it will increase strikes on Gaza following concern over launches of kites, drones and balloons from the territory.as several kites were found in an Israeli community near the border with Gaza over the weekend, local media reported, threatening that "A balloon is treated like a kite, and a kite is treated like a drone, with or without explosives."

== 20th century ==
During World War II, a large number of barrage balloons were inflated over the city of London in an effort to obstruct Luftwaffe air attacks during the Battle of Britain. Whatever their effectiveness, they were a cheap defense but did not stop heavy damage inflicted on Londoners during the Blitz, probably because the Heinkel He 111 bombers flew too high. Nonetheless, some 231 V-1 flying bombs were destroyed.

In the early and mid-20th century, hydrogen balloons were used extensively in upper-atmosphere research in such projects as Osoaviakhim-1, the Stratobowl launches, Project Manhigh, and Project Strato-Lab. A series of ascensions set a number of high-altitude records before space flight eclipsed ballooning as an endeavor. When governments lost interest in manned balloons, private citizens continued to strive to set records, especially for long distances, and to achieve "first" marks (such as Double Eagle II (first to cross the Atlantic Ocean) and Breitling Orbiter 3 (first to circumnavigate the world)).

Although manned high-altitude balloon ascensions are still undertaken, they are more likely to be the work of adventurers than researchers.

== Modern day ==
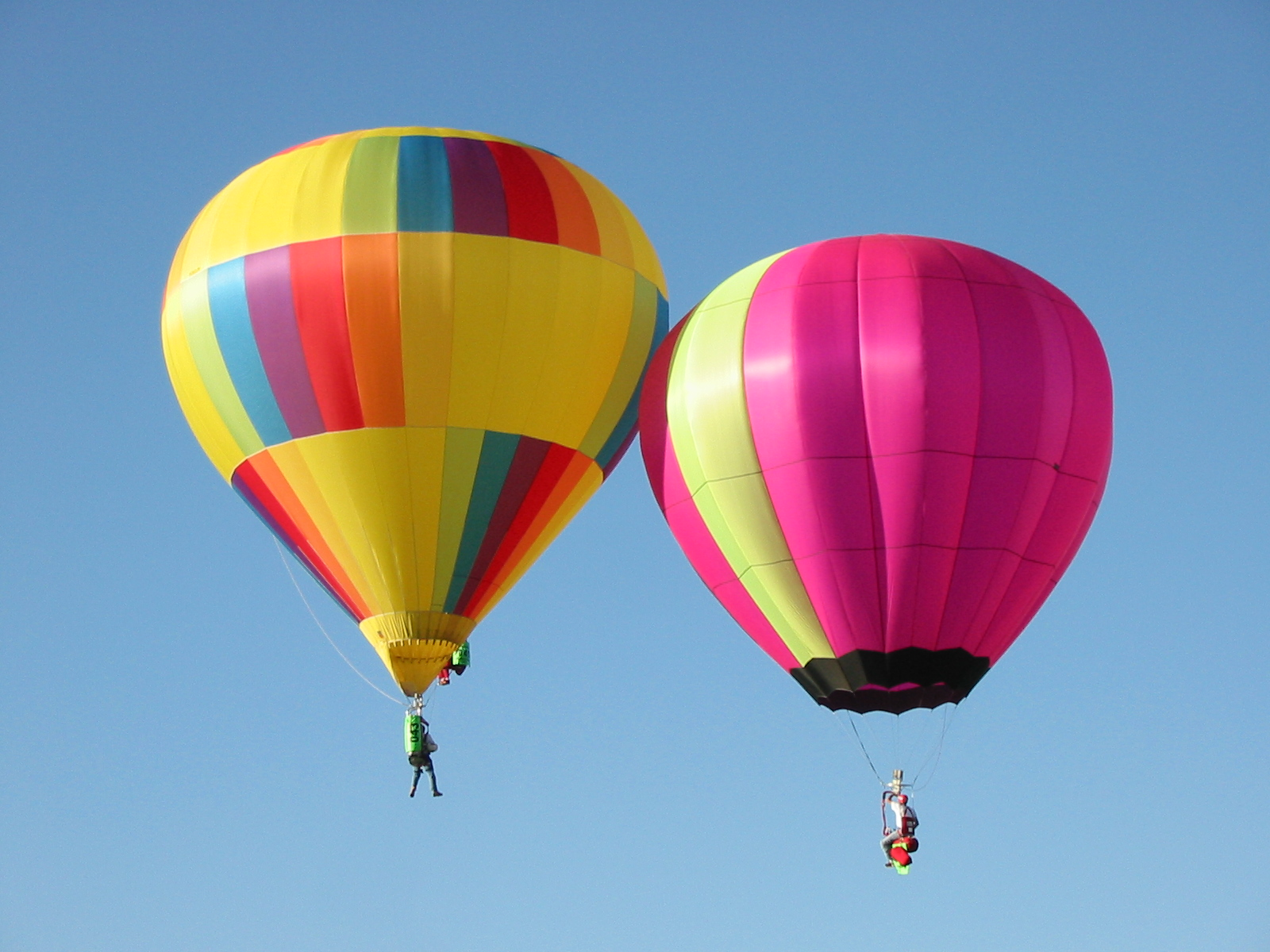
A pair of Hopper balloons

Modern hot air balloons, with a more sophisticated onboard heat source than the Montgolfier brothers' basket of hot coals, were pioneered beginning in the 1950s by Ed Yost, who had his first successful flight on 22 October 1960. The first modern-day hot air balloon to be built in the United Kingdom (UK) was the Bristol Belle in 1967. Today, hot air balloons are used primarily for recreation, and there are some 7,500 hot air balloons operating in the United States.

The first tethered balloon in modern times was made in France at Chantilly Castle in 1994 by Aérophile SA.

=== Notable accidents ===
November 1975 Pilot Terry McCormack and passenger Tony Hayes were killed near Wagga Wagga, NSW as the balloon The New Endeavour was struck by a whirlwind, causing the envelope to collapse.

On 13 August 1989, two hot air balloons collided near Alice Springs, Northern Territory in Australia. One balloon crashed to the ground, killing 13 people.

On 12 September 1995, three gas balloons participating in the Gordon Bennett Cup entered Belarusian air space. Despite the fact that competition organizers had informed the Belarusian Government about the race in May and that flight plans had been filed, a Mil Mi-24B attack helicopter of the Belarusian Air Force shot down one balloon, killing two American citizens, Alan Fraenckel and John Stuart-Jervis. Another of the balloons was forced to land while the third landed safely over two hours after the initial downing. The crews of the two balloons were fined for entering Belarus without a visa and released. Belarus has neither apologized nor offered compensation for the deaths.

On 11 August 2007, a hot air balloon burned and crashed in British Columbia when a fuel line became dislodged from a propane tank, killing two passengers; the Transportation Safety Board of Canada subsequently ruled that fuel tanks should have automatic shutoff valves.

On 1 January 2011, a hot air balloon crashed in Westfield, Somerset, United Kingdom, killing both people on board.

On 7 January 2012, a scenic hot air balloon flight from Carterton, New Zealand, touched a power line, caught fire, and crashed just north of the town, killing all eleven people on board.

On 16 March 2012, at a festival in Fitzgerald, Georgia, USA, a hot air balloon crashed due to an unexpected severe thunderstorm. The envelope failed, and the pilot died from the impact of the basket with the ground. The pilot, Edward Ristiano, had ascended so that the five passengers on board would be safe to skydive from the basket. The passengers survived, but the pilot’s body was found three days later. As Ristaino's actions saved the five passengers, he was nominated for the Medal of Freedom, the highest honor bestowed on civilians in the USA.

On 23 August 2012 in Slovenia, a hot air balloon crash-landed due to a thunderstorm, killing 6 and injuring the other 26 people on board.

On 26 February 2013 the deadliest ballooning accident in history occurred when a hot air balloon exploded and crashed near Luxor, Egypt. The crash killed 19 of the 21 people on board.

On 30 July 2016, a hot air balloon carrying 16 people caught fire and crashed near Lockhart, Texas. There were no survivors.

On 14 January 2024, a hot air balloon crashed outside Eloy, Arizona, killing the three passengers and pilot. Eight skydivers had exited the balloon immediately prior to the incident.

On 21 June 2025, a hot air balloon crashed after caught fire in Praia Grande, Santa Catarina, Brazil, killing 8 of the 21 people on board.

== See also ==
- Aviation
- Balloon (aeronautics)
- Balloon satellite
- Bristol International Balloon Fiesta
- Cluster ballooning
- Espionage balloon
- Early flying machines
- Hot air balloon festivals
- Hot air ballooning
- Lighter than air
- List of balloon uses
- Montgolfier brothers
- Non-rigid airship (Blimp)
- Observation balloon
- Research balloon
- Skyhook balloon
- Solar balloon
- Thermal airship (Hot air airship)
- Zeppelin
