= List of ballooning accidents =

This is a list of ballooning accidents by date. It shows the number of fatalities associated with various accidents that involved crewed balloons, such as Montgolfiere hot-air balloons, Charlière gas balloons, or Rozière gas and hot-air hybrid balloons. This list does not include accidents involving other types of aerostat/lighter-than-air aircraft (i.e. dirigibles, blimps, zeppelins, airships, etc.).

== List ==
Date	Incident	Location	Notes	Deaths	Injured
15 June 1785	Death of Jean-François Pilâtre de Rozier	Wimereux, France	Crashed during attempt to cross the English Channel. Balloon involved was a Rozière hybrid hydrogen-hot-air balloon and not a Montgolfiere hot-air balloon. No survivors. Considered one of the first fatal aviation accidents, possibly the first in recorded history.	2	0
6 July 1819	Death of Sophie Blanchard	Paris, France	Sophie Blanchard launched fireworks 300 m above Paris. Her balloon started burning and crashed. She fell to her death, becoming the first woman to die in an aviation accident.	1	0
8 September 1850	Death of George Burcher Gale	Bordeaux, France	George Burcher Gale died, after a ballooning demonstration in which he rode a pony suspended under a hot air balloon. After descending and detaching the pony, the balloon was released prematurely before being deflated. Gale held on to ropes attached to the basket and ascended with the deflating balloon, possibly hoping to land it safely. Gale's body was found the next day, having fallen from the balloon.	1	0
20 September 1851	Death of Joseph Tardini	Copenhagen, Denmark	After taking off from Christiansborg Palace in Copenhagen, the balloon went down in the water near Kalvebod Brygge, killing Italian balloonist Joseph Tardini who had performed dozens of flights in the past. His 11-year-old son and a woman survived. Believed to be the first ballooning death in Scandinavia. The same balloon was again used in July 1852 when Swedish balloonist M. Sivertsen made a successful flight from the town of Christiana in Norway in front of an audience of 40,000 people.	1	0
December 1853	Nimes balloon crash	Nimes, France	Balloonist M. Louis Deschamps was killed during his 120th flight from the Arena of Nîmes. Bad weather had already forced the mayor to call off a parachute performance. Deschamps was thrown from the basket, and the balloon went down about half a mile further.	1	0
October 1897	S. A. Andrée's Arctic Balloon Expedition of 1897	Kvitøya, Norway	Indirect deaths: All three balloon expedition members died of exposure months after their Charliere hydrogen balloon crashed.	3	0
2 November 1899	Captain Charles Lorraine	Christchurch, New Zealand	An aerial performer, he intended to make a balloon flight and then descend by parachute, but he had to let go of his parachute at the launch. Balloon drifted over the Port Hills and came down in Lyttelton Harbour. Lorraine reportedly attempted to swim to shore, but failed to make it.	1	0
31 August 1905	Death of John Baldwin	Greenville, Ohio	Accidentally killed in a premature dynamite/balloon stunt explosion at County Fair.	1	0
14 August 1908	Franco-British Exhibition balloon crash	London, England	A balloon owned by American balloonist Captain Lovelace exploded at the Franco-British Exhibition in London, killing his 18-year-old secretary and a male employee. Six others were injured, including a 47-year-old employee who died days later.	3	5
4 December 1910	Orkney balloon crash	Kirkwall, Orkney, Scotland	Three Germans set off on a for a day of ballooning from Munich. They were caught by the wind and blown northwest across the North Sea. The balloon briefly landed in the water, and one of the passengers fell out. As a result the balloon became lighter and took off again, drifting overnight. Their first sight of land was the next day when they crashed next to Park Cottage, Kirkwall, Orkney, Scotland. The balloon demolished a stone wall, but the remaining occupants, Distler and Joerdens, were uninjured. They stayed in Orkney for several days before catching the passenger ferry to Aberdeen, eventually making it back to Munich. Although not acknowledged, this is the first crossing of the North Sea by air.	1	0
30 January 1934		Potisky Ostrog, Russia	Three Soviet airmen were killed after their balloon, Osoaviakhim-1, crashed after setting a record for altitude at 67,585 feet (20,600 m).	3	0
13 April 1963		Herbede, Germany	Upon landing safely in a field, a gas balloon exploded while being deflated, killing three and injuring eight passengers.	3	8
12 September 1964	Death of Barbara Keith	Pacific Ocean, off the coast of Dana Point, California, United States	A balloon and its pilot disappeared in heavy clouds while participating in the Catalina Channel Balloon Race. The gondola was found two days later submerged in the water.	1	0
6 June 1968	Danube Tower balloon crash	Danube Tower, Vienna, Austria	A gas balloon struck the Danube Tower, causing the basket to plummet to the ground, killing American balloonist Francis Shields, Austrian Post and Telegraph Management official Guntram Pammer, and Austria Press Agency journalist Dieter Kasper. Footage of the incident and its aftermath appears in the disaster documentary Days of Fury (1979), directed by Fred Warshofsky.	3	0
18 September 1968	Penndel balloon crash	Penndel, Pennsylvania, United States	The balloon struck power lines on ascent during a marketing stunt for a restaurant made out of an airplane, killing its occupants, balloonist Robert Trauger and cocktail waitress for the restaurant Suzanne Stone Flannery.	2	0
21 September 1970	Free Life balloon crash	North Atlantic Ocean	The Free Life balloon was attempting to cross the Atlantic Ocean when it was forced to ditch into the north Atlantic, about 600 miles (970 km) southeast of Newfoundland.	3	0
21 February 1974	Disappearance of the Light Heart	Atlantic Ocean, near west Africa	The Light Heart was a balloon attempting to cross the Atlantic Ocean when it lost radio contact and was lost. The balloon was last sighted near the Canary Islands and heading towards Africa. Despite much searching, the balloon was never found.	1	0
7 August 1974	Death of Robert C. Berger	Barnegat Bay, Ocean County, New Jersey, United States	The "Spirit of Man" balloon exploded about an hour after takeoff in its attempt to cross the Atlantic Ocean, killing pilot Robert C. Berger.	1	0
21 October 1976	Charlotte balloon crash	Charlotte, North Carolina, United States		3	0
29 August 1978	Fishers balloon crash	Fishers, Indiana, United States		3	0
10 October 1979	Albuquerque balloon crash	Albuquerque, New Mexico, United States	Kathy Wiley and pilot Richard Temple were killed when their balloon collapsed in a wind shear and caught fire as they attempted to fly over Sandia Crest.	2	0
15 December 1979	Davie balloon crash	Davie, Florida, United States	Balloon collided with power lines, causing propane tanks to explode.	4	0
20 April 1980	Hurricane balloon crash	Hurricane, West Virginia, United States		3	0
20 September 1980	Flims hot-air balloon crash	Near Flims, Switzerland		3	0
15 August 1981	Barrington Hills hot-air balloon crash	Barrington Hills, Illinois, United States	Balloon hit high-voltage lines and burst into flames after which five people jumped and died; sole survivor suffered serious burns.	5	1
1 July 1982	Valais hot-air balloon crash	Kranzberg mountain, Valais, Switzerland		4	0
3 October 1982	Piedmont balloon crash	Piedmont, South Carolina, United States		3	0
3 October 1982	Albuquerque balloon crash	Albuquerque, New Mexico, United States	After a normal landing, liquid propane escaped, vaporized and ignited the gondola. The balloon began to rise and four remaining passengers fell or jumped, killing three of them.	4	4
27 June 1983		Bad Bruckenau, Germany	While participating in the Gordon Bennet Cup balloon race, champion balloon pilot Maxie Anderson and his co-pilot Don Ida were killed after their gondola detached from their balloon and crashed to the ground. The balloonists were attempting to land to avoid drifting into East German airspace, which had denied entry.	2	0
21 March 1987		Summit Park, Utah, United States	A hot air balloon collided with power lines, severing the basket. One man was killed and 8 injured when they crashed 50 feet to the ground.	1	8
6 September 1987	Sussex balloon crash	Sussex, New Brunswick, Canada	Strong gust of wind caused a balloon to lose altitude and explode into flames after hitting a power line, forcing the three occupants to jump 14 metres (46 ft) to the ground. One passenger was killed, while the balloon pilot and another passenger were seriously injured.	1	2
11 June 1989	Garner balloon crash	Garner, North Carolina, United States	Balloon struck cables of a TV tower, causing it to plummet to the ground.	3	0
21 June 1989	Dairy Queen balloon crash	Calgary, Alberta, Canada	After the balloon struck power lines and caught fire, the pilot jumped from the balloon but died from the fall.	1	0
13 August 1989	1989 Alice Springs hot air balloon crash	Near Alice Springs, Australia	Mid-air collision with another balloon.	13	0
15 October 1989	Cessnock balloon crash	Cessnock, New South Wales, Australia	Balloon contacted power lines during misjudged landing, fatally electrocuting the pilot, then reascended, as one passenger fell from the basket to his death. Four other occupants escaped with no injuries.	2	0
6 October 1990	Groß-Schweinbarth balloon crash	Groß-Schweinbarth, Austria	Balloon struck trees while attempting to land, destroying the basket and causing those inside to fall to the ground. The balloonist and three passengers were killed. Three other passengers were seriously injured.	4	3
6 October 1990	Albuquerque balloon crash	Albuquerque, New Mexico, United States	Balloon pilot Stephen Falacy and passenger William Schobel jumped to their deaths from a burning gondola after Sunrise Special collided with a power line south of Bernalillo. Footage of the incident was featured in the second installment of Joe Francis' shockumentary series, Banned from Television.	2	0
11 December 1990	Columbus balloon crash	Columbus, Ohio, United States	Balloon struck TV antenna after departing from a field.	4	0
10 June 1991	Death of Michael McGrath	Greenwood, Missouri, United States	While attempting to tie down a balloon, a man was carried aloft as the balloon unexpectedly took flight. He was carried about 100 feet before falling to his death.	1	0
9 August 1992	Mesquite balloon crash	Mesquite, Texas, United States	A hot-air balloon struck high-voltage power lines, caught fire and plummeted onto a freeway access road, killing its two occupants during the seventh annual Mesquite Balloon Festival.	2	0
21 May 1993	Gnadendorf balloon crash	Gnadendorf, Austria	A fire broke out during a landing attempt, killing five passengers, including two children. The pilot and two other passengers were both seriously injured.	5	3
8 August 1993	Woody Creek balloon crash	Woody Creek, Colorado, United States	Balloon struck power transmission line, causing basket to fall more than 100 feet (30 m).	6	11
9 October 1993	Albuquerque balloon crash	Albuquerque, New Mexico, United States	Sunrunner pilot Allan Jones and passenger Karl Gordon died when a balloon hit power lines north of Alameda, severing the gondola from its envelope.	2	0
15 January 1994	Osterburken balloon crash	Osterburken, Germany	Balloon caught fire while attempting to land; a 45-year-old man jumped from a height of 8 meters (26 ft) and was injured, a 27-year-old woman jumped from a height of 25 meters (82 ft) and was killed, the 50-year-old balloonist was on fire and fell to his death from a height of 80 meters (260 ft), and the woman's partner, a 29-year-old man, remained in the basket and died in the fire.	3	1
19 October 1995	Christchurch balloon crash	Off the coast of Christchurch, New Zealand	Strong winds forced the balloon to ditch into the sea, killing three people. Others survived.	3	0
21 July 1997	Death of Audrey Jones	North Ferriby, England	A woman celebrating her 75th birthday was killed and 11 other passengers were injured when their balloon hit powerlines and crashed to the ground.	1	11
18 October 1997	Kienberg hot-air balloon crash	Kienberg, Germany	Gas balloon burst into flames and separated from the basket due to coming too close to the antennae of Nauen Transmitter Station, which caused electrostatic reactions.	4	0
5 October 1998	Death of Odella Marie Deutschman	Albuquerque, New Mexico, United States	Odella Marie Deutschman died and 12 others were injured as Wayfinder plowed in to two sets of power lines near the Sunport before crashing at Kirtland Air Force Base.	1	12
9 May 1999	Morgan Hill hot air balloon crash	Morgan Hill, California, United States	Balloon burst into flames after hitting a power line. The occupants, a married couple, were killed, while the pilot survived with serious injuries.	2	1
16 June 1999	Ibbenbüren hot-air balloon crash	Ibbenbüren, Germany	Crashed after hitting a power line.	4	0
26 August 2001	Verrens-Arvey hot-air balloon crash	Verrens-Arvey, France	Exploded after hitting a power line.	6	0
23 July 2004	Lucerne hot-air balloon accident	Lucerne, Switzerland	Balloon struck buildings and a tree due to strong winds, injuring passengers and causing a woman to fall through an opening in the floor of the gondola. The balloon landed about 20 minutes later.	1	10
25 September 2004	Death of Matthew Jacobson	Lewisburg, West Virginia	After landing the balloon, the balloon began to ascend after an airplane flyby created lift. The balloon's pilot wrapped a rope from the basket around his leg and was pulled into the air. Once the balloon rose between 100 and 120 feet in the air, the pilot fell and was fatally injured.	1	0
13 April 2005	Death of Thomas Gregorio	Marana, Arizona	A hot air balloon clipped a mountain, smashing supports of the wicker gondola and catching fire. The accident caused the death of one passenger and injuries to 10 others.	1	10
18 May 2005		Shreveport, Louisiana	Two people were killed when their hot air balloon crashed after hitting power lines.	2	0
13 April 2007	Death of Linda Dickson	Mecca, California	A Canadian woman was killed when she was thrown from the basket after the balloon she was riding in struck power lines in high winds. Two others were injured.	1	2
25 August 2007	Surrey, B.C. balloon crash	Surrey, B.C., Canada	Two people died and eleven were injured when their hot-air balloon caught fire and crashed near Surrey, British Columbia.	2	11
8 October 2007	Death of Rosemary Phillips	Albuquerque, New Mexico, United States	Rosemary Wooley Phillips was thrown from a gondola and fell more than 60 feet to her death after a balloon got caught on a utility line.	1	0
16 November 2007		Hampton, Iowa	Two Colorado men were killed and a third man from New Mexico was injured when a powerline severed the wicker basket from their balloon, causing them to crash 60 feet to the ground. An investigation cited pilot error for the crash.	2	1
20 April 2008	Death of Adelir Antônio de Carli	Off Brazil's Atlantic coast	Cluster ballooning attempt.	1	0
17 August 2008	Death of Elmer "Bill" Blair	Mountain Grove, Missouri	A hot air balloon exploded after propane began to leak, causing the balloon to catch fire. The balloon's pilot jumped from the balloon, and was killed when he hit the ground. A person aiding the pilot was injured when trying to rescue the pilot from the burning wreckage.	1	1
10 October 2008	Death of Stephen Lachendro	Bernalillo, New Mexico, United States	Balloon crashed into power lines setting it on fire during Albuquerque Balloon Fiesta.	1	1
9 July 2008	Death of Earl MacPhearson	Phoenixville, Pennsylvania	A pilot was landing a balloon with 10 passengers when he leaned out to reach a rope and fell. He was fatally injured when he became trapped between the basket and the ground. Seven passengers were taken to hospitals and the balloon's pilot was killed in the accident.	1	0
29 May 2009	Death of Kevin Beurle	Cappadocia, Turkey	A British man was fatally injured and nine other passengers injured, one critically, after two hot-air balloons collided midair.	1	9
14 October 2009	Yangshuo hot-air balloon crash	Near Yangshuo, Guangxi, China	Four Dutch tourists died early when their hot-air balloon caught fire and crashed.	4	3
25 April 2010	Al Ain hot air balloon crash	Sweihan, Al Ain, United Arab Emirates	Balloon crash landed in the desert after attempting to descend in turbulent weather. Two tourists were killed and the rest of the occupants were injured.	2	11
29 September 2010	54th Gordon Bennett Gas Balloon Race Accident	Adriatic Sea, 11 miles north of Vieste, Italy.	World champion balloonists Richard Abruzzo, 47, of Albuquerque, and Carol Rymer Davis, 65, of Denver were caught in a storm while participating in the Gordon Bennett Gas Balloon race. Their bodies were found by a fisherman, still inside their balloon's gondola.	2	0
7 January 2012	2012 Carterton hot air balloon crash	Near Carterton, New Zealand	Entangled in power lines, resulting in fire.	11	0
16 March 2012	Death of Edward Ristaino	Fitzgerald, Georgia	Balloon pilot fell to his death after his balloon became sucked up in a fast moving thunderstorm.	1	0
23 August 2012	2012 Ljubljana Marshes hot air balloon crash	Municipality of Ig, Slovenia	Balloon caught in wind shear, crashed into trees, and caught fire	6	26
26 February 2013	2013 Luxor hot air balloon crash	Luxor, Egypt	Fire in the basket caused by a leaking fuel line. Deadliest ballooning accident in aviation history.	19	2
20 May 2013		Cappadocia, Turkey	Two sightseeing balloons collided mid-air during a sightseeing tour, causing one balloon to crash.	3	23
6 August 2013	Death of Grant Adamson	Montbovon, Fribourg, Switzerland	Balloon crashed down after contact with power lines.	1	4
11 August 2013	Death of Maxime Trépanier	Mont-Saint-Gregoire, Canada	Balloon pilot lost his balance and fell to his death after basket bounced upon landing and the balloon ascended unexpectedly during the Saint-Jean-sur-Richelieu International Balloon Festival.	1	0
9 May 2014	Ruther Glen balloon crash	Ruther Glen, Virginia, United States	Balloon struck power lines and caught fire during descent, killing pilot and 2 passengers.	3	0
15 June 2014	Death of Jeff Hooten	Spring City, Pennsylvania	At the end of a commercial balloon flight, upon landing, the balloon's pilot lost his balance and fell out of the basket, sustaining fatal injuries.	1	0
17 December 2014	Death of Tang Yi	Cappadocia, Turkey	A balloon carrying Chinese and Malaysian tourists crash-landed in the Guvercinlik Valley, killing one and seriously injuring others.	1	15
26 June 2015		Cappadocia, Turkey	18 tourists were seriously injured when their balloon made a hard landing and caught fire.	0	18
10 June 2016	Death of Ryan Almeter	Nunda, New York	A ground crewmember remained holding on to the balloon after it began to ascend unexpectedly. The crewmember lost his grip on the basket and fell 100 feet to his death.	1	0
30 July 2016	2016 Lockhart hot air balloon crash	Maxwell, Texas, United States	Contact with power lines before crashing, killing all 16 people on board.	16	0
25 October 2016	Death of Suzanne Astle	Mooinooi, South Africa	Strong winds caused the balloon to drift and the pilot to attempt an emergency landing. In the crash, a woman was thrown from the basket where she suffered fatal injuries.	1	3
18 February 2017	Death of Benny Karl Jensen	Cappadocia, Turkey	A Danish tourist was killed when he fell from the basket of a hot air balloon during a hard landing.	1	20
14 March 2017		Cappadocia, Turkey	49 tourists were wounded when three sightseeing balloons collided and crash landed in high winds.	0	49
9 April 2017	Death of Vince Caumontat	Cappadocia, Turkey	The French deputy consul to Istanbul was killed when the balloon he was riding in hit powerlines and crash landed.	1	7
5 January 2018	Death of Darren Jay Wiggill	Luxor, Egypt	A South African tourist was killed and twelve others were injured when their hot air balloon crashed due to inclement weather.	1	12
3 August 2018	Death of Dana Joyce Haskell	Hartsel, Colorado	A sightseeing flight carrying two commercial pilots and nine passengers experienced a difficult landing due to windy conditions, where the basket bounced several times and dragged 40–50 feet. During deflation, two passengers fell out of the basket; a 65-year-old passenger was seriously injured, and a 73-year-old passenger was killed.	1	1
29 June 2018	Death of John Moran	Ashland, Ohio	After landing, wind pulled the balloon forward and tipped the basket over. The pilot fell forward and hit his head on the dual burner assembly, knocking him unconscious. He later was pronounced dead at the hospital.	1	3
10 April 2019		Shandong, China	A mother and son fell to their deaths after the tethered balloon they were riding burst possibly due to unusually high altitude.	2	0
16 August 2020	Death of Andreas Kindler	Sankt Goar, Germany	Balloon got carried away by strong winds during landing, hitting the nearby bank of river Rhine. The pilot was killed, while four passengers were flung from the basket, with two severely injured.	1	6
23 January 2021	Death of Wade Lee	Rio Rancho, New Mexico	A Lindstrand LBL-77A Balloon experienced a hard landing in a remote desert area. The balloon's passenger was transported to the hospital where he died due to blunt pelvic trauma from the impact.	1	0
26 June 2021	2021 Albuquerque hot-air balloon crash	Albuquerque, New Mexico, United States	Contact with a power line causing the balloon to catch on fire and causing a power outage in the area. The pilot was later found to have had cocaine in his system at the time of the crash.	5	0
15 July 2021	Death of Brian Boland	Bradford, Vermont	The pilot of a hot air balloon died after being flung off as the balloon tipped over during ascent, becoming entangled under its basket, and falling to the ground.	1	0
18 October 2022		Cappadocia, Turkey	Two tourists were killed and three people were injured when a gust of wind forced the balloon they were riding in to make a hard landing.	2	3
25 January 2023	2023 Santa Catarina hot air balloon crash	São João do Sul, Santa Catarina, Brazil	The pilot and two passengers were injured after falling from the basket of a hot air balloon that struck power lines during a landing attempt. One of the passengers filmed the accident and posted on his 270 thousand subscribers YouTube channel.	0	3
1 April 2023	2023 Teotihuacan hot-air balloon crash	Teotihuacan, San Juan Teotihuacan de Artisa, Mexico	Two people died and a girl was injured after the hot air balloon they were riding in caught fire near Mexico City.	2	1
25 June 2023	Death of Peter Gregory	Ombersley, Worcestershire, UK	A man died after falling from a balloon after it caught on fire.	1	0
4 November 2023	2023 Page hot-air balloon crash	Page City Park, Arizona, USA	An Aerostar International Inc. X-8 hot air balloon crash-landed and hit a parked car after its burners failed to ignite during landing. A passenger was seriously injured when they fell out of the basket.	0	1
14 January 2024	2024 Eloy, AZ hot-air balloon crash	Eloy, Arizona, USA	Four people died and one was injured after the hot air balloon they were riding experienced an as-yet-unidentified issue with its envelope. Eight skydivers had previously exited the gondola and were unharmed. Toxicology tests showed the pilot had a high amount of ketamine in his blood, which was found to have been administered by emergency medical personnel as part of treatment after the accident.	4	1
7 February 2024	2024 Asureti hot air balloon crash	Asureti, Tetritsqaro Municipality, Georgia	All three people on board died when a Cameron Balloons Z-315 hot air balloon collided with a high-voltage power line in Georgia.	3	0
18 March 2024		Preston, Victoria, Australia	A man died after falling to the street from a hot air balloon flying over urban Melbourne. The fatal fall was not being treated as suspicious and is suspected to be an intentional incident of self harm.	1	0
11 May 2025	Death of Lucio Bañuelos	Zacatecas, Mexico	A man fell to his death while participating in a balloon ride at a local festival. When the balloon caught fire, he managed to get his wife and children to safety via an improvised rope, but was not able to escape himself.	1	2
15 June 2025	Death of Hüseyin Türk	Cappadocia, Turkey	Balloon made a hard landing due to strong winds, killing the pilot and injuring 12 passengers.	1	12
15 June 2025	Death of Juliana Pereira	Capela do Alto, São Paulo, Brazil	A woman died and 11 others were injured after a "clandestine" hot air balloon with 33 passengers lost control and crash-landed.	1	11
21 June 2025	2025 Santa Catarina hot air balloon crash	Praia Grande, Santa Catarina, Brazil	Eight people died and 13 others were injured after a hot air balloon caught fire.	8	13
13 August 2025	Death of Matsje Veenema	De Hoeve, Friesland, Netherlands	Balloon touched the ground hard while on descent due to strong winds. 5 of the 34 occupants were thrown from the basket during the hard landing; one did not survive.	1	5
9 March 2026	Death of Jagoda Gancarek	Zielona Góra, Lubusz, Poland	Balloon collides with apartment block before crash landing into a bus in the street. The pilot was thrown from the basket into a rooftop and did not survive; the 2 passengers suffered minor injuries.	1	2

== See also ==
- List of airship accidents
