= 2025 Santa Catarina hot air balloon crash =

2025 hot air balloon accident in Brazil

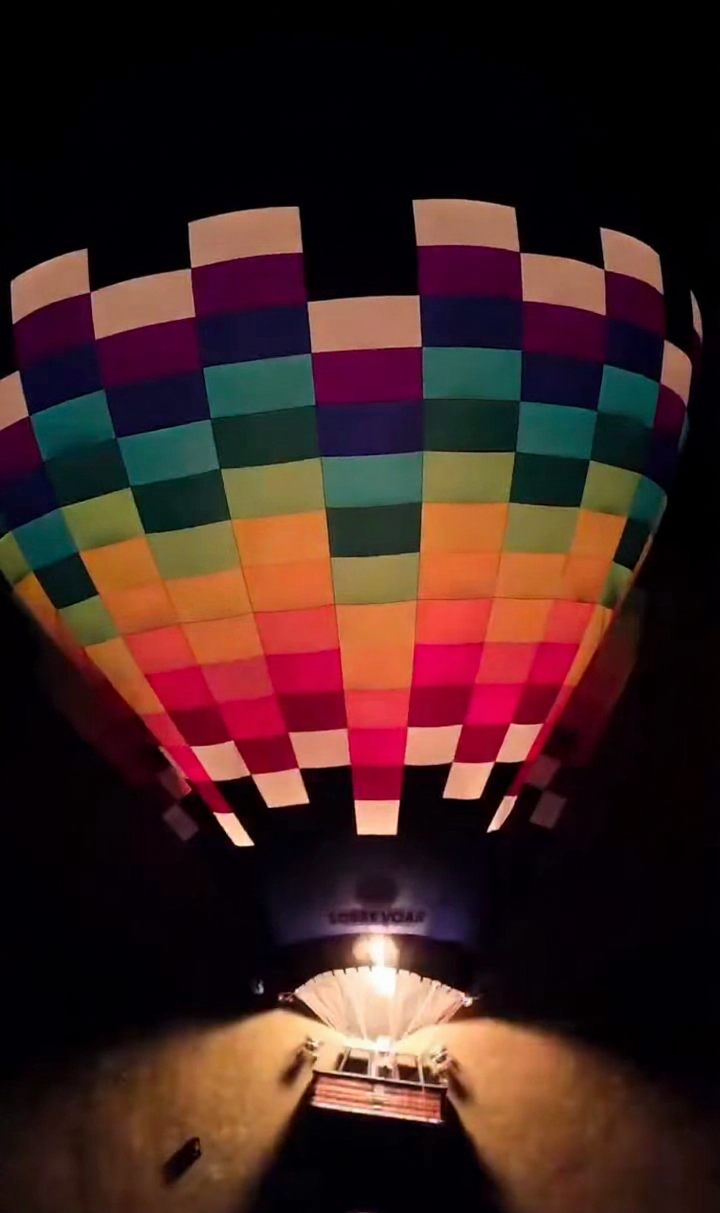
- BR-MEA3, the hot air balloon involved in the accident, pictured in 2024

Accident
- Date: 21 June 2025
- Summary: In-flight fire; under investigation
- Site: Cachoeira de Nova Fátima region, Praia Grande, Santa Catarina, Brazil; 29°09′42″S 49°54′50.6″W

Aircraft
- Aircraft type: Golfier Balloons G-32-13000
- Operator: Sobrevoar Serviços Turísticos
- Registration: BR-MEA3
- Occupants: 21
- Passengers: 20
- Crew: 1
- Fatalities: 8
- Injuries: 5
- Survivors: 13

On 21 June 2025, a hot air balloon caught fire and crashed in Praia Grande, Santa Catarina, Brazil, killing 8 of the 21 people on board.

It is the deadliest ballooning accident in Brazil and the deadliest worldwide since 2016, when 16 people were killed in a collision between a hot air balloon and power lines near Lockhart, Texas, United States.

== Background ==
Praia Grande is a municipality located in southern Santa Catarina, a state in the South Region of Brazil. For being a known destination for hot air ballooning activities, it is called "Brazilian Cappadocia", with around 100 balloon flights daily. Newspaper Clarín reported that hot air ballooning is particularly popular in June and couples usually celebrate Dia dos Namorados (Portuguese for Lovers' Day) on June 12 by doing it.

Hot air ballooning in the country is regulated by the National Civil Aviation Agency of Brazil (Portuguese: Agência Nacional de Aviação Civil, ANAC), which requires specific qualifications for pilots and maintenance of the equipment, although the agency itself considers it as a "high risk" activity and tourist flights in balloons are not regulated.

The balloon had a six-meter-wide basket, the capacity to transport a maximum of 24 people at the cost of R$550 (US$102.04) per passenger and carried out in 45-minute-long trips up to 1,000 meters high. News portal G1 reported that the company involved in the accident is Sobrevoar Serviços Turísticos, which operates in Praia Grande, and that the vehicle had permission to fly. The owner, which suspended its activities indefinitely after the disaster, said it complied with all regulations and had a clean accident record prior to it.

It was the second fatal balloon crash in the country in less than a week, when an unlicensed balloon carrying 35 people fell in Capela do Alto, São Paulo state, killing a 27-year-old woman celebrating Dia dos Namorados with her husband and injuring 11 other people six days earlier.

== Accident ==
The pilot, who survived the crash, said that at c. 9:30 a.m. BRT, two minutes into the flight, a fire started inside the basket, forcing him to reduce the balloon’s elevation in an effort to allow the occupants to jump out to safety. However, several occupants failed to jump and the balloon, with the weight relieved, rose immediately, trapping the eight victims who were unable to escape in time. It consequently fell after being deflated by the flames. The fall occurred near a healthcare center, in a wooded area just two kilometers away from the takeoff site. Around 30 military firefighters were dispatched to the scene with the support of several vehicles and an aircraft.

The weather conditions were clear in the region at the time of the accident. Footage shared on social media show the balloon aloft in flames and people jumping from the basket.

== Victims ==
Five injured people, including two with second-degree burns, received treatment at the Nossa Senhora de Fátima municipal hospital. A witness said they observed "a mud-covered woman in a state of shock along with a man limping", as well as two bodies.

Four people were burned to death in the basket and another four died after falling. The deceased—two couples, a mother and her daughter, an ophthalmologist and a figure skater—were from Santa Catarina and neighboring Rio Grande do Sul state, most of them were in the city enjoying the Feast of Corpus Christi holiday.

== Investigation ==
Santa Catarina's public safety secretary Flavio Graff said authorities have opened an investigation and the results will be made public within 30 days. Graff also said according to the state civil police, the pilot has given testimony and they will also gather statements from survivors. The Aeronautical Accidents Investigation and Prevention Center (Portuguese: Centro de Investigação e Prevenção de Acidentes Aeronáuticos, CENIPA), Santa Catarina's Fire Department and Scientific Police will also investigate the causes of the accident. ANAC said it is taking "the necessary measures to investigate the situation of the aircraft and crew".

Preliminary investigations indicated that the fire was possibly started with the blowtorch used to produce the hot air.

== Reactions ==
Governor of Santa Catarina Jorginho Mello posted a video expressing sadness for those lost in the tragedy and directing the state structure to provide the assistance needed and check the developments.

President Luiz Inácio Lula da Silva expressed his "solidarity with the families of the victims" in a post on his X account, placing "the federal government at the disposal of the victims" and stating that "state and municipal forces" were working on the rescue and care of the survivors.

== See also ==
- List of ballooning accidents
- 2013 Luxor hot air balloon crash, a similar accident in a hot air ballooning destination
- Transport in Brazil
