= 1989 Alice Springs hot air balloon crash =

Mid-air collision between two hot air ballons

Coordinates: 23°59′00″S 134°03′26″E

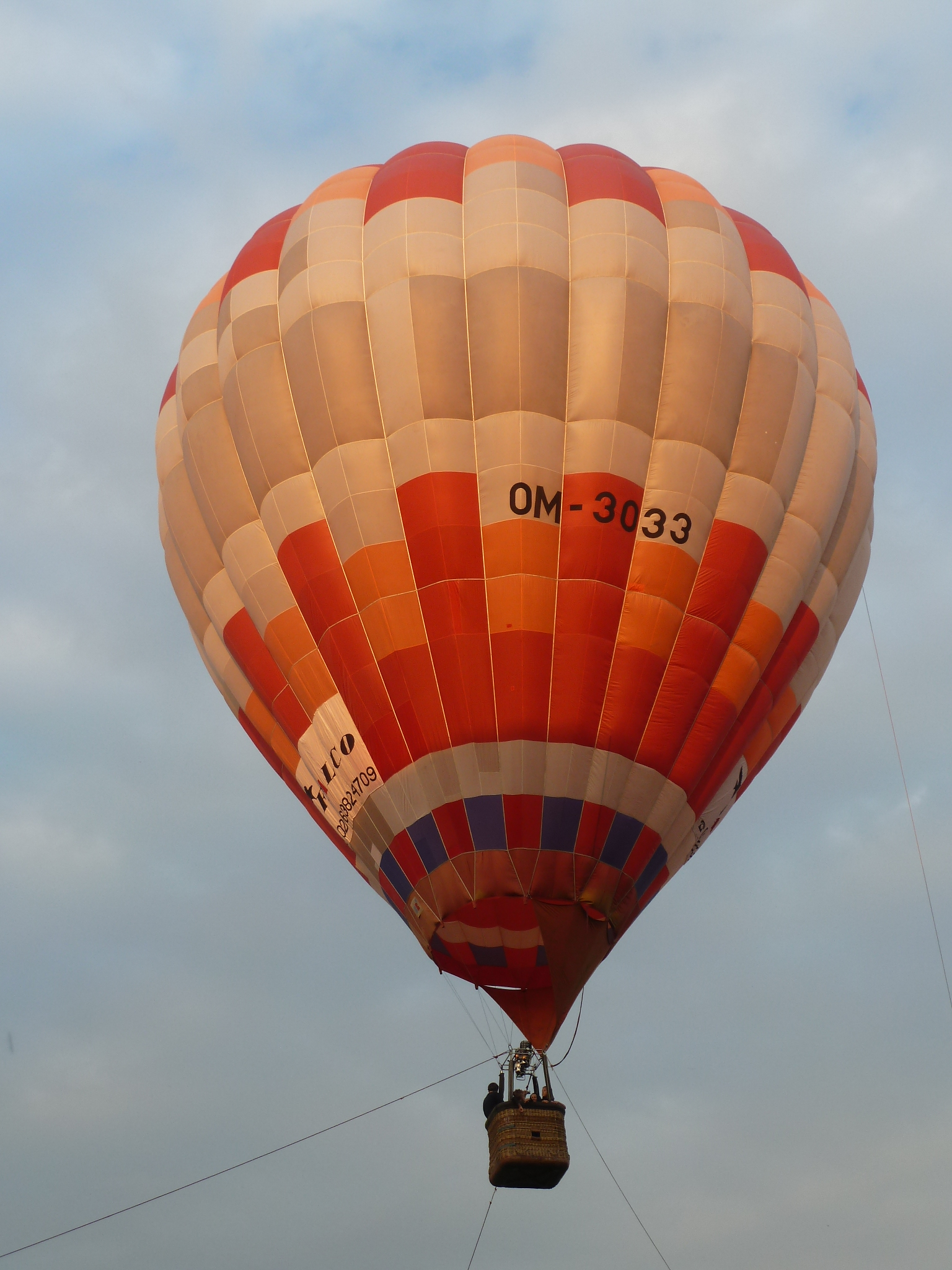
- A hot air balloon similar to the accident balloon

Accident
- Date: 13 August 1989 at 6:38 am ACST (UTC+9:30)
- Summary: Hot-air balloon mid-air collision
- Site: Near Alice Springs, Northern Territory, Australia
- Operator: Toddy's Ballooning
- Flight origin: Alice Springs
- Passengers: 12
- Crew: 1
- Fatalities: 13
- Survivors: 0

On 13 August 1989, two hot air balloons collided near Alice Springs, Northern Territory, Australia, causing one to crash to the ground, killing thirteen people. It was the world's deadliest ever ballooning disaster until February 2013, when a balloon accident near Luxor, Egypt killed 19 people. As of May 2023, it remains the deadliest ever ballooning accident in Australia, and the third-deadliest worldwide, surpassed only by the Egypt crash and a balloon accident in Texas in 2016 that claimed the lives of 16 people.

== Accident ==
The flight took off at Santa Teresa Road, 29 kilometres south east of Alice Springs.

The accident was the result of a mid-air collision at 6:38 am, local time. One balloon ascended, colliding with another balloon above it. The envelope of the lower balloon engulfed the basket of the upper balloon, causing a tear in the envelope. The lower balloon hovered briefly, before rapidly deflating and plunging to the ground at high speed, killing its pilot and all twelve passengers. One body was reportedly thrown clear of the basket. The pilot had turned off the gas burners before impact. The male pilot and ten of the passengers were Australian. Six of the passengers were male and six female. One male passenger was Danish and another male passenger was an Italian who lived in Monaco. All of the passengers were adults.

The descent reportedly lasted 51 seconds. Witness statements said the balloon "folded and fell to earth" and that it "fell to the ground like a streamer". A tourist in another balloon said,

"I could see one of the balloons rising quite fast under another balloon. The lower balloon came up and hit the other one. Its top was touching the basket and it was shaking the passengers around. A rip appeared at the top of the balloon and it started to move away. It wasn't a very rapid movement. It moved away slowly but you knew it was in trouble. The pilot tried frantically to blast hot air into the stricken 'chute as the balloon lost height but there didn't appear to be any panic."

The tear in the stricken balloon's red and black envelope was described as being the size of a bed sheet, and the balloon crashed between two small trees in open scrubland about 16 kilometres from Alice Springs Airport.

Another news report said that ten bodies, arms interlinked, were found in the balloon's gondola. Three others were nearby in the sand, having apparently been ejected. Four balloons were in the air at the time of the accident. The pilot of one of the other balloons had made a radio call to alert the emergency services. Passengers of the other balloons were treated in hospital for shock on their return to Alice Springs.

== Investigation ==
The Bureau of Air Safety Investigation (BASI) found that the operator of the upper balloon, the operator of the ballooning company to which both balloons belonged, had failed to give way to the lower balloon as required by the company's operations manual. The investigation report said that the upper balloon was found to be missing the mandatory instrument package and that its pilot had refused to cooperate with investigators. Both balloons were fitted with ultra high frequency radios operating on the same channel, but neither pilot contacted the other.

The investigation found also that the pilot of the lower balloon, which crashed, had failed to properly assess the position of the upper balloon before ascending in close proximity to it. The investigation reported that the balloon plunged 2000 feet. The report said safety measures flowing from its investigation were now being implemented and that the Civil Aviation Authority should improve surveillance.

== Aftermath ==
In 1992, the Northern Territory Supreme Court sentenced the pilot of the upper balloon, Michael Sanby, to two years' jail, with an eight-month non-parole period, after an eight-man, four-woman jury had found him guilty of committing a dangerous act. He was found not guilty on 13 charges of manslaughter. The charge of committing a "dangerous act" was reported at the time as being unique to the Northern Territory. The judge found that the pilot had "failed to keep a proper lookout for a period of 30 seconds (during which the other balloon was hidden from view) and that the failure seriously endangered the lives of those below". During his 13-week trial, the court was told that Sanby had outlaid about $1 million of borrowed money to get into the new commercial hot-air ballooning industry, and that business at Toddy's Safari Ballooning was booming.

Sanby's conviction was subsequently overturned on appeal.

== See also ==
- List of ballooning accidents
