= Bristol Belle =

First modern hot air balloon in Britain

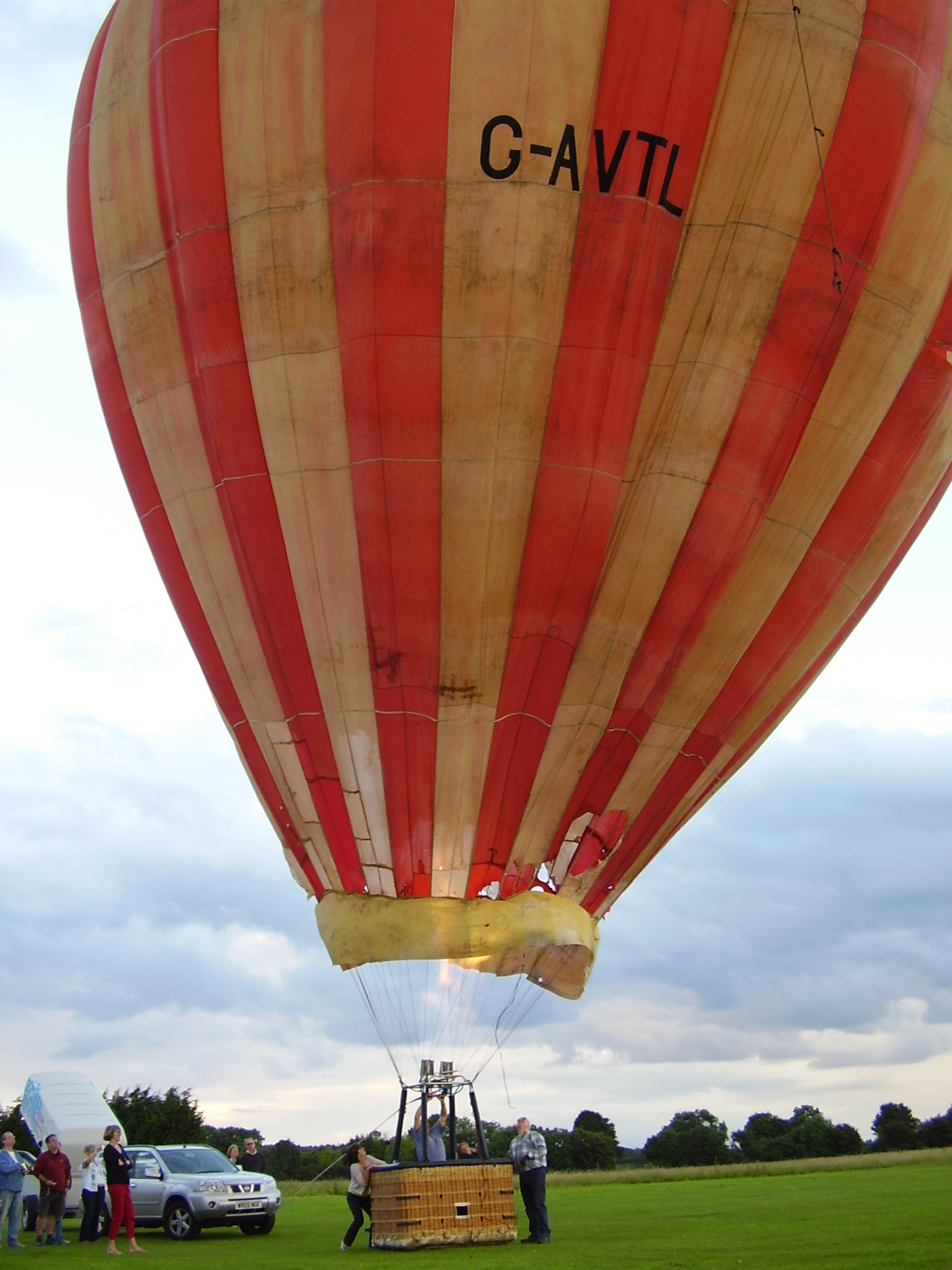
- The Bristol Belle shown inflated

General information
- Type: Hot Air Ballon

History
- First flight: 1967

The Bristol Belle (G-AVTL) was the name given to the first modern hot air balloon in Britain. The balloon was created from an idea developed by members of the Bristol Gliding Club in the United Kingdom. Following developments by Ed Yost in the United States, members of the Bristol Gliding Club decided to create their own hot air balloon. Bill Malpas (chairman of the project), Mark Westwood, Giles Bulmer of the Bulmer cider making family and Don Cameron were the four project creators.

Three other members, Charles Meisl, a Czechoslovak citizen, Tom Sage, a press photographer from London and Malcolm Brighton subsequently joined the group. Malcolm Brighton had built a number of balloons and became the main builder for the project.

In the summer of 1966, the team went to Dunstable Air Day and saw a number of attempts at a hot air balloon flight by other teams. One, built by teacher Mr. Turner and students at Bolton Technical School, succeeded with a tethered flight before breaking free unintentionally and taking its pilot some distance before the pilot escaped unhurt, but with the balloon draped over a power line. The committee of the air day prohibited any further balloon take offs that day.

In 1967, the Bristol Belle balloon was complete. Wing Commander Gerry Turnbull from RAF Weston-on-the-Green, an experienced gas-balloon pilot, was to teach the team how to fly. Space heating blowers known as Jetairs were used to inflate the balloon. The balloon initially failed after the first few attempts at inflation, splitting with three distinct tears. Westwood and Cameron set about working on correcting this in the design, and with the assistance of GQ Parachutes in Woking, had the ballon repaired and correctly manufactured to cope with the stresses.

The first flight of the Bristol Belle took place on 9 July 1967 from RAF Weston-on-the-Green, and was covered by the Daily Telegraph and other media. The balloon took part in some famous flights including one from HMS Ark Royal, where it was piloted by Lt Terry Adams, accompanied by Lt Howard Draper both of 849 Squadron, B Flight. This early morning launch carried mail to Malta while the Ark Royal was steaming off the southern coast of the island on 29 November 1970.
