= 2016 Lockhart hot air balloon crash =

Hot air balloon crash in Texas, United States

Accident
- Date: July 30, 2016
- Summary: Collision with power lines due to pilot error
- Site: Maxwell, Texas, United States; 29°53′6″N 97°45′44″W

Aircraft
- Aircraft type: Kubicek BB85Z hot air balloon
- Operator: Heart of Texas Balloon Ride company
- Registration: N2469L
- Flight origin: Fentress Airpark, Texas
- Destination: Unplanned
- Occupants: 16
- Passengers: 15
- Crew: 1
- Fatalities: 16
- Survivors: 0

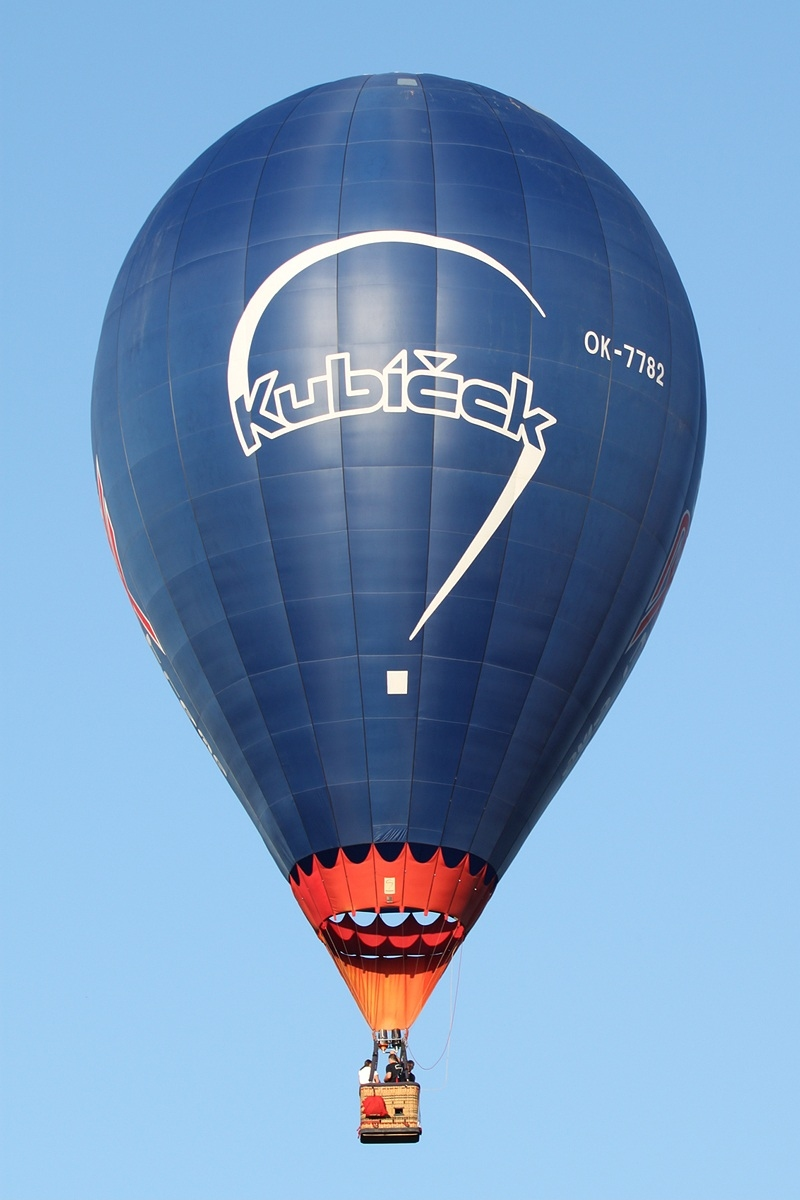
Kubicek BB-20XR

On July 30, 2016, 16 people were killed when the hot air balloon they were riding in struck power lines, crashed and caught fire in the unincorporated community of Maxwell, near Lockhart, Texas, 30 miles (50 km) south of the state capital Austin. It is the deadliest ballooning disaster to ever occur in the United States.

== Aircraft ==
The aircraft involved was a Balóny Kubíček BB85Z hot air balloon, registration N2469L. The balloon was operated by the Heart of Texas Balloon Ride company, which served people in the Greater Austin area.

== Accident ==
About 1 hour and 50 minutes before the flight's takeoff, the pilot assessed weather observations and forecasts for the planned route that indicated observations of clouds as low as 1,100 feet above ground level. The balloon departed from Fentress Airpark at 06:58 local time (11:58 UTC) on Saturday, July 30, 2016. The ground crew at takeoff reported watching the balloon fly in and out of a cloud layer until losing sight of it. The flight was conducted under the provisions of 14 Code of Federal Regulations Part 91 as a sightseeing passenger flight. It was carrying the pilot and fifteen passengers. At 07:42, the aircraft struck power lines, caught fire and crashed into a field near Lockhart, Texas. All sixteen people on board were killed. The emergency services were alerted at 07:44 about a "possible vehicle accident", and arrived at the scene to find the basket of the balloon on fire.

A witness described hearing two "pops" which were thought to be a gun going off. Reports said that the balloon lost contact about half an hour into the scheduled one-hour flight. The envelope of the balloon landed about 3/4 mile (1,320 yd; 1,210 m) northeast of the burned-out gondola. The flight had covered a distance of about 8 nautical miles (15 km).

== Investigation ==
The Federal Aviation Administration and the National Transportation Safety Board (NTSB) led the investigation into what was designated a "major accident" by the NTSB. The Federal Bureau of Investigation (FBI) also secured evidence for the NTSB's investigation. Fourteen personal electronic devices (cellphones, an iPad, and cameras) were recovered from the wreckage. These were turned over to the FBI for the recovery of evidence. The NTSB held an investigative hearing into the accident in December 2016.

In October 2017, the NTSB determined the accident was caused by the pilot's "pattern of poor decision-making" that led him to launch the balloon (on a day when other balloon operators cancelled their planned flights because of low cloud and fog), to continue the flight into fog and above clouds, and then to descend near clouds which made it difficult to see and avoid obstacles. The pilot's medical conditions (depression and ADHD), the prescription drugs he was taking, and the fact that balloon pilots do not need a medical certificate even for commercial flights were contributing factors leading to the accident. An investigation found the balloon operator was found to have taken diazepam and oxycodone that likely affected the flight, as well as had enough diphenhydramine in his system to have the "equivalent blood-alcohol content of a drunken driver". Prior to the accident, the balloon's operator had at least four convictions for drunk driving and two incarcerations, conditions that would have prevented him from obtaining a medical flight certificate, should they have been required at the time.

== Aftermath ==
On August 1, Heart of Texas Hot Air Balloon Rides, whose owner died in the accident, announced that it would be suspending operations.

After the crash, the NTSB issued two recommendations to make ballooning safer: to remove medical exemptions for pilots, and to encourage the FAA to revisit their procedures for commercial balloon operators. Texas lawmakers sought to bring stronger regulation for balloon flights, proposing new legislation in late 2017. On April 25, 2018 Texas Congressman Lloyd Doggett successfully introduced an amendment to incorporate the NTSB's recommendations for balloon operators as part of the Federal Aviation Administration Reauthorization Act. The bill was approved for floor action the next day. Five months later on September 27, 2018, the House of Representatives approved the legislation mandating medical exams for commercial balloon pilots as part of federal law.

Despite being written into federal law, it would not be until 2022 before the Federal Aviation Administration formally adopted rules requiring pilots of sightseeing operations and hot air balloons that carry paying customers to hold a medical certificate and to pass medical examinations, as required by commercial airplane and helicopter pilots.

== See also ==
- List of ballooning accidents
- 2012 Carterton hot air balloon crash -- a very similar accident where poor pilot decision-making resulted in balloon colliding with power lines
- NTSB Aviation Investigation Number: DCA16MA204
