= Praia Grande, Santa Catarina =

Praia Grande
- Municipality
- The Municipality of Praia Grande
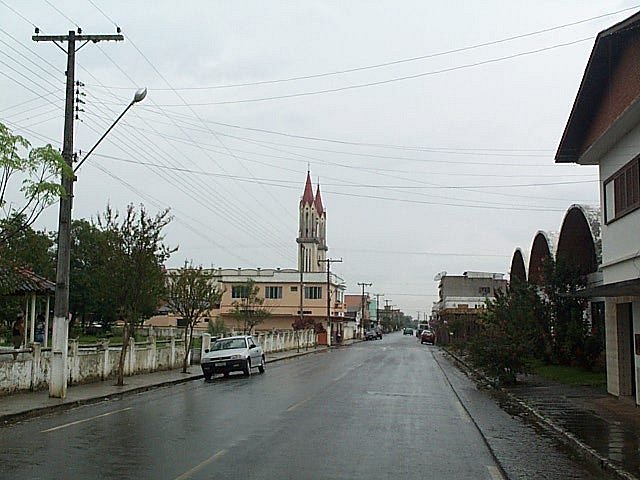
- Irineu Bornhausen Street in downtown Praia Grande.

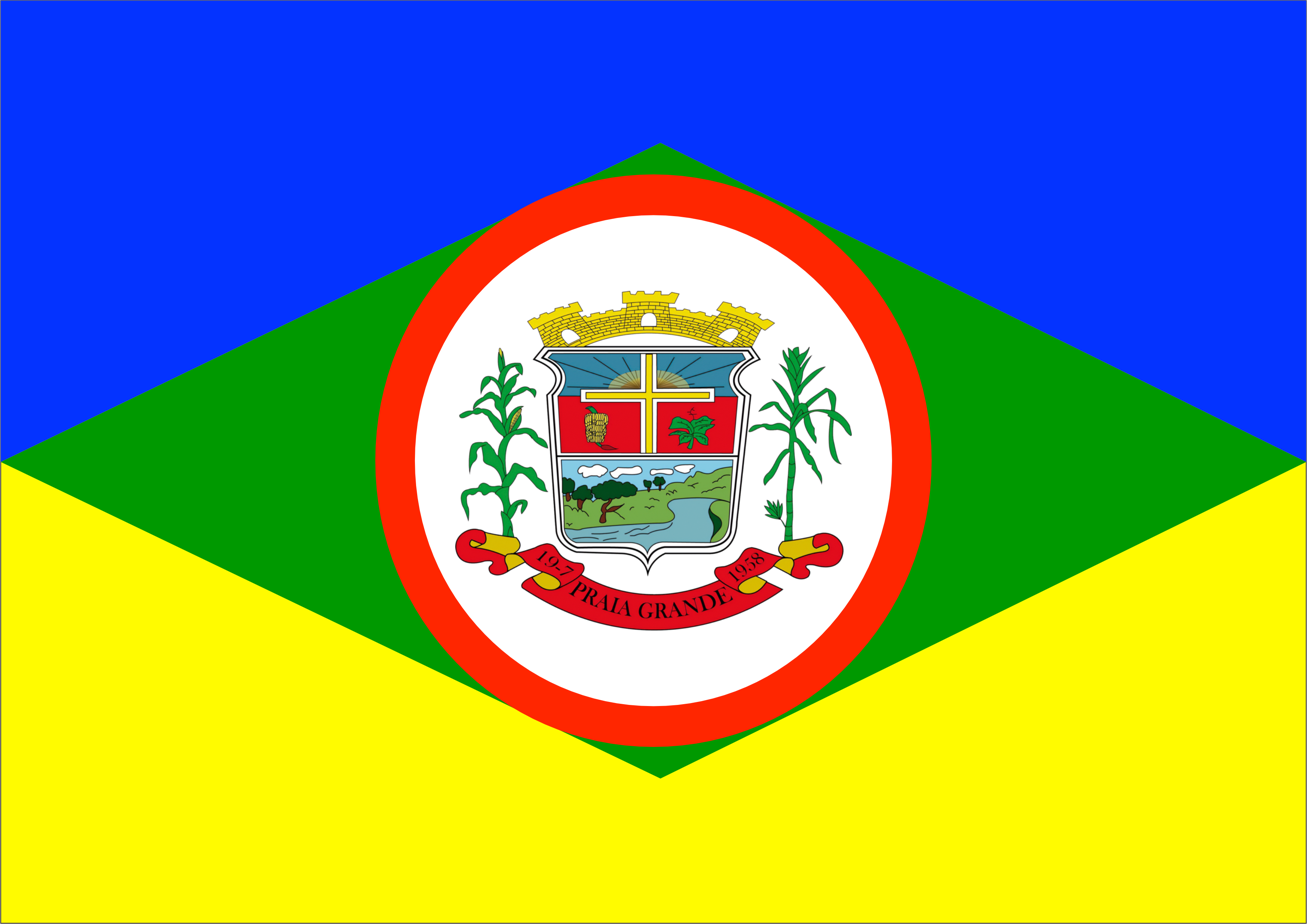
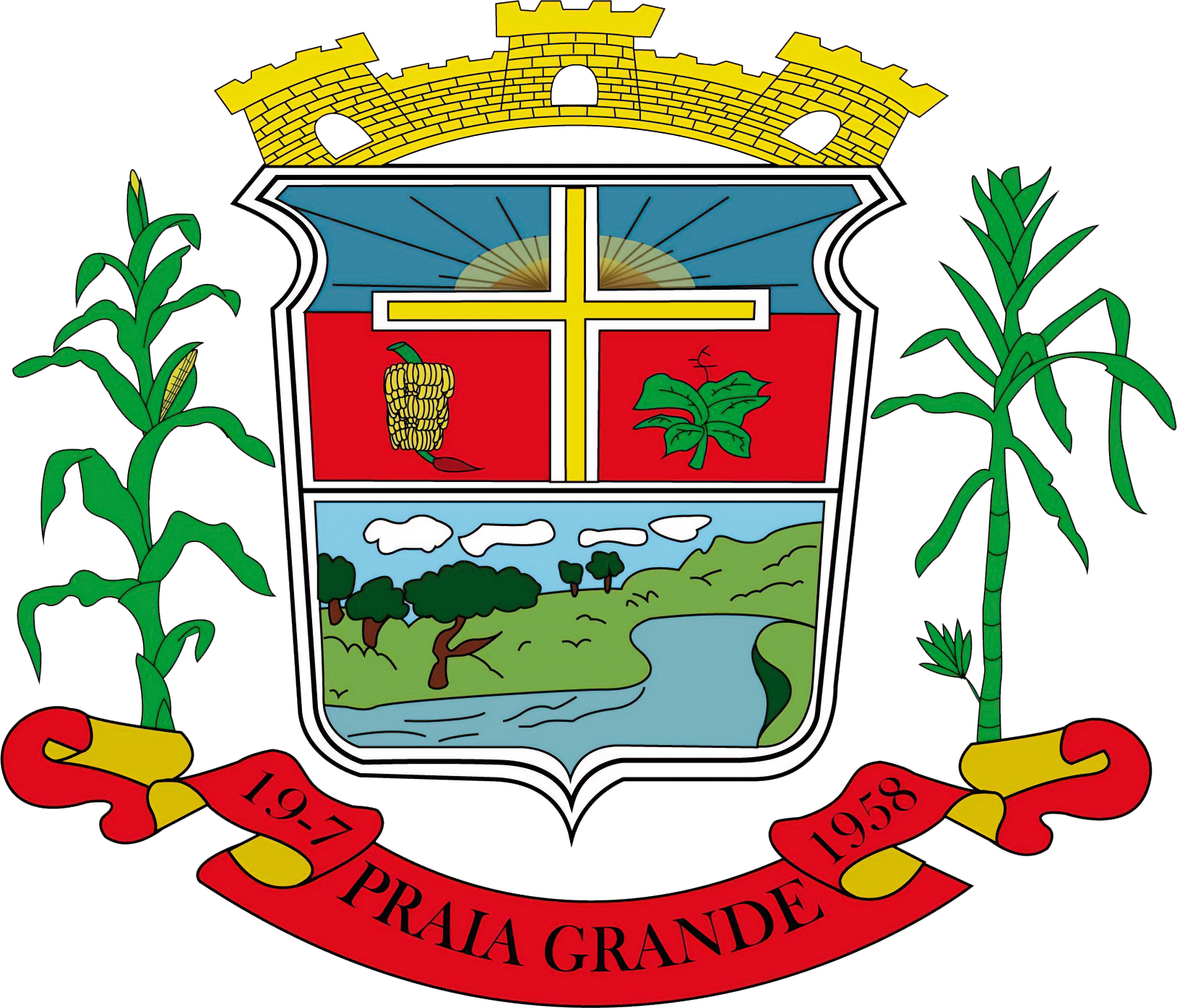
- Flag Coat of arms

- Location of Praia Grande
- Coordinates: 29°11′49″S 49°57′00″W
- Country: Brazil
- Region: South
- State: Santa Catarina
- Founded: July 19, 1958

Government
  - Mayor: João José de Matos (PMDB)

Area
  - Total: 278.576 km^{2} (107.559 sq mi)
- Elevation: 45 m (148 ft)

Population (2020)
  - Total: 7,312
  - Density: 25.4/km^{2} (66/sq mi)
- Time zone: UTC-3 (UTC-3)
  - Summer (DST): UTC-2 (UTC-2)
- HDI (2000): 0.763 – medium
- Website: www.praiagrande-sc.gov.br

Praia Grande is the southernmost municipality in the Brazilian state of Santa Catarina. Despite its name (which means Great Beach in Portuguese), the city is landlocked.

The nearby canyons, which include Serra Geral National Park and Aparados da Serra National Park, make it a destination for hot air ballooning activities. On 21 June 2025, a hot air balloon crashed in the town, killing 8 of the 21 people on board.
