= Peskovci =

Peskovci Petőfa
- Location in Slovenia
- Coordinates: 46°48′24.32″N 16°15′0.49″E
- Country: Slovenia
- Traditional region: Prekmurje
- Statistical region: Mura
- Municipality: Gornji Petrovci

Area
  - Total: 3.78 km^{2} (1.46 sq mi)
- Elevation: 260.7 m (855 ft)

Population (2020)
  - Total: 73
  - Density: 19/km^{2} (50/sq mi)

Peskovci (pronounced [pɛˈskoːu̯tsi]; Hungarian: Petőfa) is a small village immediately east of Gornji Petrovci in the Prekmurje region of Slovenia.
