= USSR-1 =

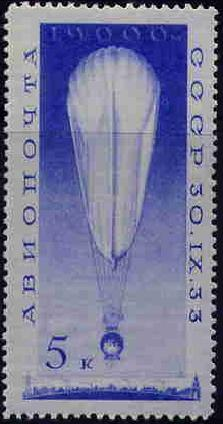
- USSR-1 over Moscow Kremlin on a 1933 postage stamp (Scott C37). Here the balloon is shown in low altitude configuration; in stratosphere the envelope expanded into a nearly perfect sphere. The balloon did not pass over the Kremlin directly, but it was clearly in sight for the first few hours of the flight.

General information
- Type: Stratospheric research Helium balloon
- National origin: Soviet Union
- Manufacturer: First Airship Division
- Number built: 1

History
- Developed from: Osoaviakhim-1

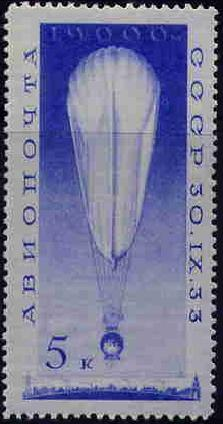

USSR-1 (Russian: СССР-1) was a record-setting, hydrogen-filled Soviet Air Forces high-altitude balloon designed to seat a crew of three and perform scientific studies of the Earth's stratosphere. On September 30, 1933, USSR-1 under Georgy Prokofiev's command set an unofficial world altitude record of 18,501 m (60,699 ft).

After the crash of Osoaviakhim-1 in January 1934 USSR-1 was retrofitted with a gondola parachute and a new gas envelope. On June 26, 1935, it flew again as USSR-1 Bis. The balloon reached 16,000 meters where an accidental release of hydrogen, probably caused by a faulty valve, forced it into an unexpected descent. After expending all available ballast, two crew members bailed out on personal parachutes at low altitudes; the flight commander stayed on board and managed to perform a soft landing.

== Design ==
Auguste Piccard's high-altitude flights of 1930–1932 aroused the interest of Soviet Air Forces and Osoaviakhim, the Soviet paramilitary training organization, as well as individual pilots, designers and flight enthusiasts. Civilian projects by Osoaviakhim and the national Meteorology Committee were delayed by lack of finance, and in the first half 1933 the military stratospheric program had a solid lead in time.

Air Forces project was led by commander of the First Airship Division Georgy Prokofiev, the future captain of USSR-1. Prokofiev coordinated a close Moscow-based group of designers, notably TsAGI professor Vladimir Chizhevsky (gondola) and rubber technologist Konstantin Godunov (gas envelope) who were supported by the staff of Air Forces Institute, Zhukovsky Airforce Academy and Rubber Industry Institute. Consolidation of practically all available expertise and military project management eventually resulted in a sound and safe design. It was, as a joke, called a Prokofier (a pun on Prokofiev's surname and Montgolfier).

The gas envelope of USSR-1 was of conventional design, differing from low-altitude balloons only in its size (24,500 cubic meters at stratospheric altitudes). It employed around five thousand meters of thin fabric made in Noginsk, impregnated with 25 layers of latex-based sealant, and sewn into the desired shape at a rubber factory in Khamovniki.

Spherical gondola was made by riveting 3 millimeter thick duralumin sheets with internal reinforcement bars; the latter passed through the skin through airtight flanges and were connected to two external structural rings, the upper for attaching suspension cables and the lower for attaching bumper basket and ballast weights. This setup unlinked the gondola from the dynamic forces exerted by suspension cables; gondola skin was subjected only to static air pressure. The landing basket, like the crumple zones of modern automobiles, was designed and tested to collapse at impact speeds exceeding 5 meters per second. There were two cast aluminum escape hatches, each with a submarine-style fast-opening lock. Lead ballast was stowed outside the landing basket in forty small bags; by pulling a cable through an airtight driveshaft, operators tumbled the bag upside down, dropping the small lead pellets. In case of emergency, an entire metric ton of ballast could be released in less than two minutes.

The crew's lives depended on the integrity of the gondola skin: pressure suits, developed by Evgeniy Chertovsky since 1931, were not operational yet. Life support consisted of pressurized oxygen tanks and chemical carbon dioxide absorption packages; all crew members carried personal parachutes. A radio transceiver was carried within the gondola; most scientific instruments externally. The latter included sets of ingeniously designed bottles for taking samples of air; their sealed necks were broken open by an electromagnetic actuator and re-sealed by heating the neck with an electric current running through an exposed platinum wire. New pyranometers designed for USSR-1 were not used on its first mission.

== Failed launch ==
USSR-1 was ready to fly in the beginning of September 1933. The upcoming maiden flight, scheduled on September 24, 1933, was widely publicized; the aircraft plant were USSR-1 gondola was prepared to flight attracted masses of visitors, but the actual launch from a military airfield in Kuntsevo ended in a humiliating failure. First, when the envelope was already inflated, it was found that the bottom of the envelope dangerously mingled with the ropes; a volunteer, Fyodor Tereschenko, climbed the rope and untied the knots. USSR-1 was then cleared to fly, but failed to lift off due to moisture buildup in foggy weather.

The huge bag rose groggily about 10 ft. It wobbled sideways across the airdrome, but not an inch higher would it go. The ground crew dragged the bag back; part of the heavy apparatus was unloaded. Still no luck. After two hours of struggle, Air Commander Garankidze wearily ordered: "De- flate."

== Record flight ==
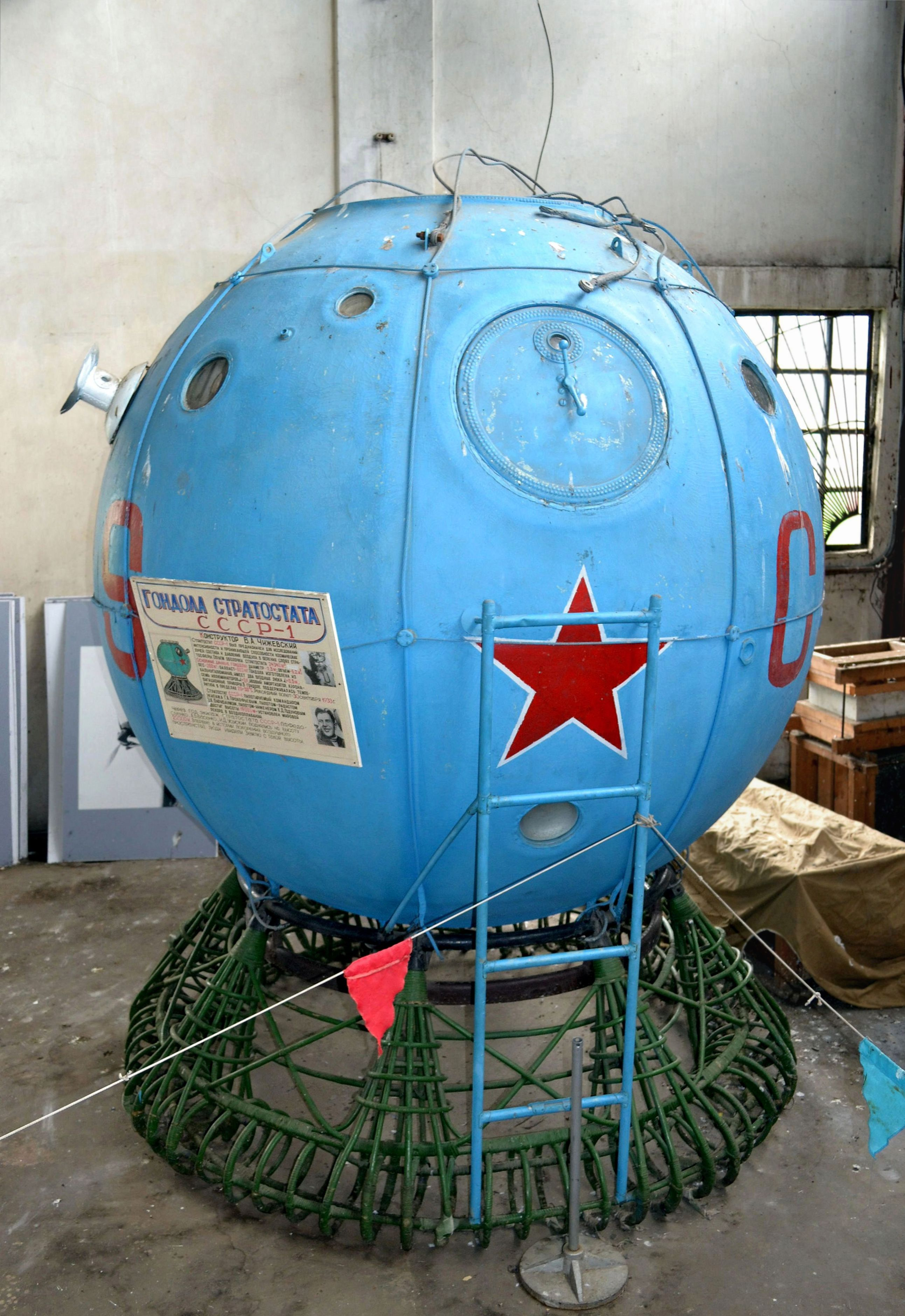
USSR-1 balloon gondola displayed at the Central Air Force Museum in Monino, Russia.

Next attempt to launch USSR-1 was scheduled on September 30, 1933; Osoaviakhim-1 was prepared to fly from Kuntsevo later on the same day. Unlike previous attempts, when the balloon was filled from pressurized tanks, this time hydrogen was stored in "elephants" – auxiliary balloons (120 cubic meters each), that, like real animals, were led to the field on leashes. At about 06:00 Moscow time the envelope was filled with 3000 cubic meters of hydrogen, or 1/8 of the balloon's geometric capacity. At stratospheric altitudes, this amount would have expanded to fill the whole envelope.

Prokofiev reported status to Air Forces chief Jēkabs Alksnis around 8:00. USSR-1 with Prokofiev, Godunov and radio operator Ernst Birnbaum on board lifted off at 8:40 Moscow Time and established radio contact with ground five minutes later. According to Prokofiev's flight log, at 9:17 am USSR-1 passed 16,800 meter mark, beating Piccard's record; between 9:19 and 9:26 the aircraft, fully expanded, levelled in a static equilibrium at 17,500 meters. Prokofiev released 80 kilograms of ballast to proceed further; after additional ballast drops at 9:47, 10:30, 11:40 and 12:00 the aircraft resumed slow ascent and at 12:55 reached 19,200–19,300 meters. Later, Prokofiev's numbers were adjusted for instrument errors to 19,000 meters max altitude at 12:45. Descent to 10,500 meters took around two hours; at this altitude the crew discharged all electrical batteries as a precaution against short circuit during landing. At 16:36 (8,000 meters) Prokofiev stopped recording flight data and concentrated on airspeed control; around 17:00 the aircraft softly landed on a field near the town of Kolomna, around 110 kilometers from the launch site.

Clear skies and benign winds in stratosphere allowed continuous visual contact between ground stations and USSR-1, however, the flight of Osoaviakhim-1, scheduled to take off later than USSR-1, was cancelled due to unexpected strong winds at ground level. Prokofiev's altitude readings, reported by radio, were immediately re-broadcast by TASS and United Press. USSR-1 altitude record, although not recognized by FAI, was publicized worldwide, as well as scientific data released shortly after the flight.

Fully half the 80,000 population of Kolomna, carefully primed by Dictator Stalin's propagandists to witness a great scientific conquest by their nation, poured across the Moscow River to greet the aeronauts. Pilot George Prokofiev mounted the gondola, harangued the crowd with a lecture in which he credited the flight's success entirely to the Proletarian Revolution and the Communist Party.

After the flight the crewmembers, three designers and plant manager responsible for building USSR-1 were awarded the Order of Lenin, then the highest award for military or civil achievement. The flight was commemorated by an issue of postage stamps (Scott C37, C38, C39).

== USSR-1 Bis ==
After the crash of Osoaviakhim-1, the military demanded an overhaul of safety procedures and features. While the USSR-1 gondola was deliberately designed for safety, in case of the catastrophic failure of the balloon the crew had to bail out on personal parachutes. The Osoaviakhim-1 envelope and suspension failed at altitudes where humans were not yet able to bail out, its crew members probably incapacitated by high g-forces as the gondola erratically rotated around its remaining suspension cables. Thus the designers focused on assuring crew survival above 8,000 meters mark. USSR-1 was re-fitted with new suspension with a quick-release latch that enabled instant separation of the gondola from the envelope, and a large (1,000 square meters, 34 meters diameter) parachute capable of stabilizing the fall at safe speeds; the upgraded aircraft was renamed USSR-1 Bis.

The USSR-1 Bis with military pilots Christian Zille (flight commander), Yury Prilutsky (co-pilot) and professor Alexander Verigo as an on-board researcher lifted off from Kuntsevo at 05:25, June 26, 1935. Prokofiev was in charge of ground control. By 8:00 it reached maximum scheduled altitude, 16,000 meters. A brief stay at this level was terminated by an unexpected descent, probably caused by losing hydrogen through a faulty valve; soon, under 15,000 meters, vertical speed passed the safety limits, threatening to destroy the USSR-1 Bis in an Osoaviakhim-1-like crash dive. Dumping ballast initially slowed the descent, but vertical airspeed picked up again. Zille ordered Verigo and Prilutsky to bail out; they jumped at 3,500 and 2,500 meters, respectively.

Zille, aware that the externally carried gondola parachute was tied to the same structural ring that also carried scientific instruments, feared that the dynamic shock caused by parachute deployment would destroy the instruments. Instead of deploying the parachute, he dumped unnecessary items left in the gondola, stabilizing descent speed at three meters per second. Shortly before landing, as a precaution, he stepped outside the gondola, holding onto external ladder steps; the landing near Trufanovo, Tula Oblast turned out to be soft and safe. The crew were hailed as heroes and awarded the Order of Lenin.

== Legacy ==
Fragments from the USSR-1 were used to wrap an issue of USSR in Construction about the 17th Congress of the Communist Party.

== See also ==
- Flight altitude record

== Sources ==
- Brontman, Lazar (1939). "Diaries, 1939–1940 (in Russian)".
- Druzhinin, Yu. A. (2006). "Polyoty v stratosfery v SSSR v 1930-e g. (Полёты в стратосферу в СССР в 1930-е г.)". Voprosy istorii estestvoznania i tehniki (in Russian) (4). Archived from the original on 2010-12-06.
- Garry, A., Kassil, L. (1934). Potolok mira (Потолок мира). Moscow.
- Istochnik journal staff (1997). "Dokumenty o katastrophe stratostata Osoaviakhim-1 (Документы о катастрофе стратостата Осоавиахим-1)". Istochnik (in Russian) (2).
- Maxwell, Alexander (January 1936). "Sky high, why not?". Popular Mechanics: 26–27, 136A.
- Shayler, David (2000). Disasters and accidents in manned spaceflight. Springer. pp. 20–22. ISBN 978-1-85233-225-9.

Preceded by Auguste Piccard and Max Cosyns	Human altitude record Sept 1933-Nov 1933	Succeeded by Thomas G. W. Settle and Chester L. Fordney
