= Pál Luthár =

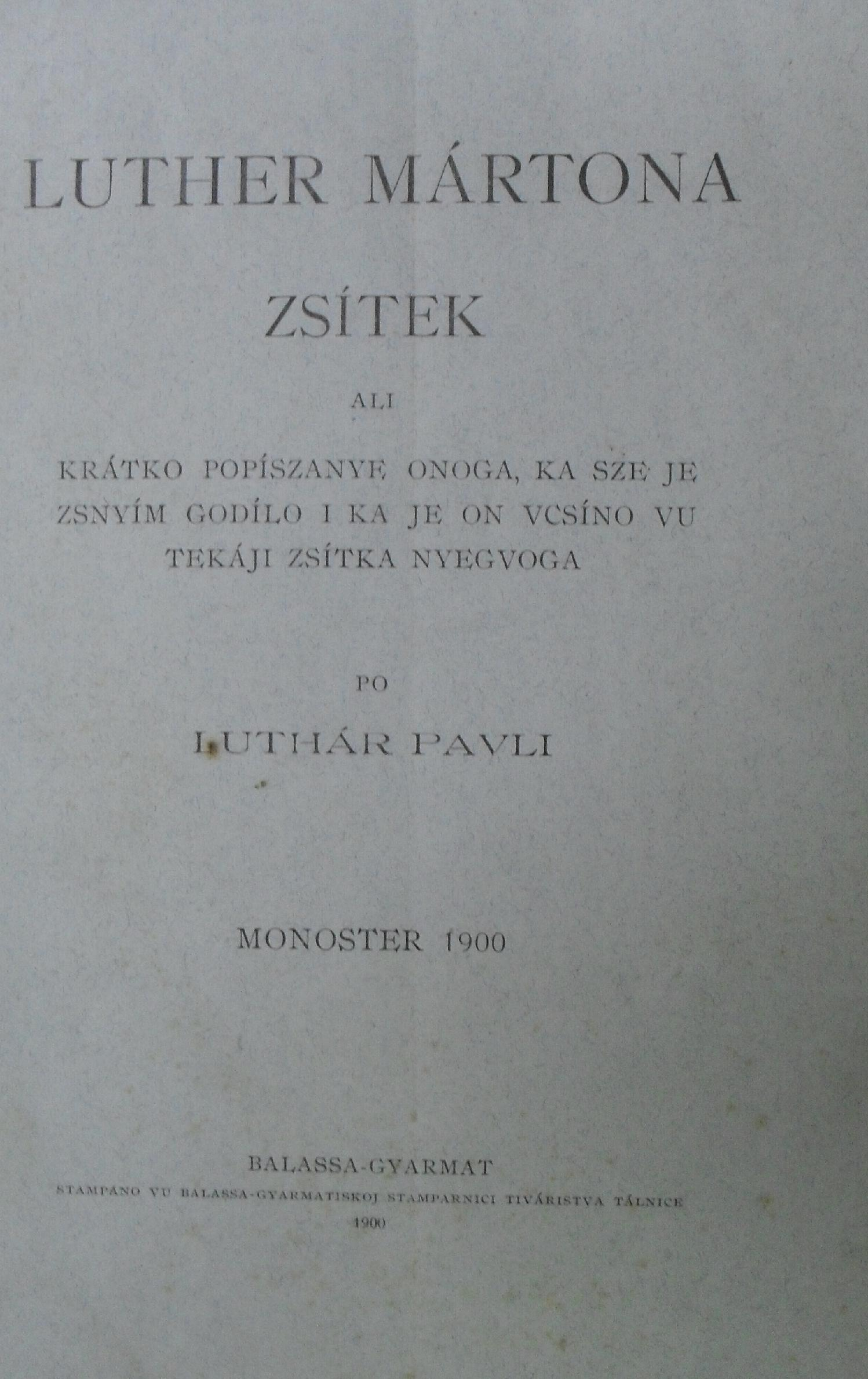
Luthár's work.

Pál Luthár (Slovene: Pavel Lutar) (November 1, 1839 – February 14, 1919) was a Slovene Lutheran teacher, organist, and writer.

He was born in Križevci near Gornji Petrovci (Prekmurje). His father János Luthár was a farmer. He attended elementary school in Hodoš and Neuhaus am Klausenbach. From 1856 to 1865 he was a student at the Lutheran Lyceum in Sopron. In 1866, he worked with Count István Erdődy. He was an assistant teacher in Nemescsó (1867), Beled (1869), and Vásárosfalu (1869–1870), and then a permanent teacher in Vásárosfalu (1870–1874) and later in Vučja Gomila (1874–1883). In 1883 he resigned and became involved in homeopathy in Szentgyörgyvölgy. Because rival doctors moved into Szentgotthárd, his work was also carried in southern Burgenland. In 1900, he published his Luther Mártona zsitek ali krátko popiszanye onoga, ka sze je zsnyim godílo i ka jeon vcsíno (Life of Martin Luther or a Short Description of His Events and Works). He translated Lutheran hymns from German into the Prekmurje Slovene. His Lutheran prayers remained in manuscript. He wrote articles in the Lutheran monthly magazine Düsevni liszt and calendar Dober pajdás.

He died on February 14, 1919 at the age of 79 and was buried in Szentgotthárd. Géza Czipott officiated at his funeral.

== Literature ==
- Ivan Škafar: Bibliografija prekmurskih tiskov od 1715 do 1919, Ljubljana 1978.
- Franc Kuzmič: Ustvarjalna delavnost Pavla Lutharja, Porabski koledar 2013.

== See also ==
- List of Slovene writers and poets in Hungary
