= Municipality of Gornji Petrovci =

Municipality of Slovenia

Municipality of Gornji Petrovci Občina Gornji Petrovci
- Municipality
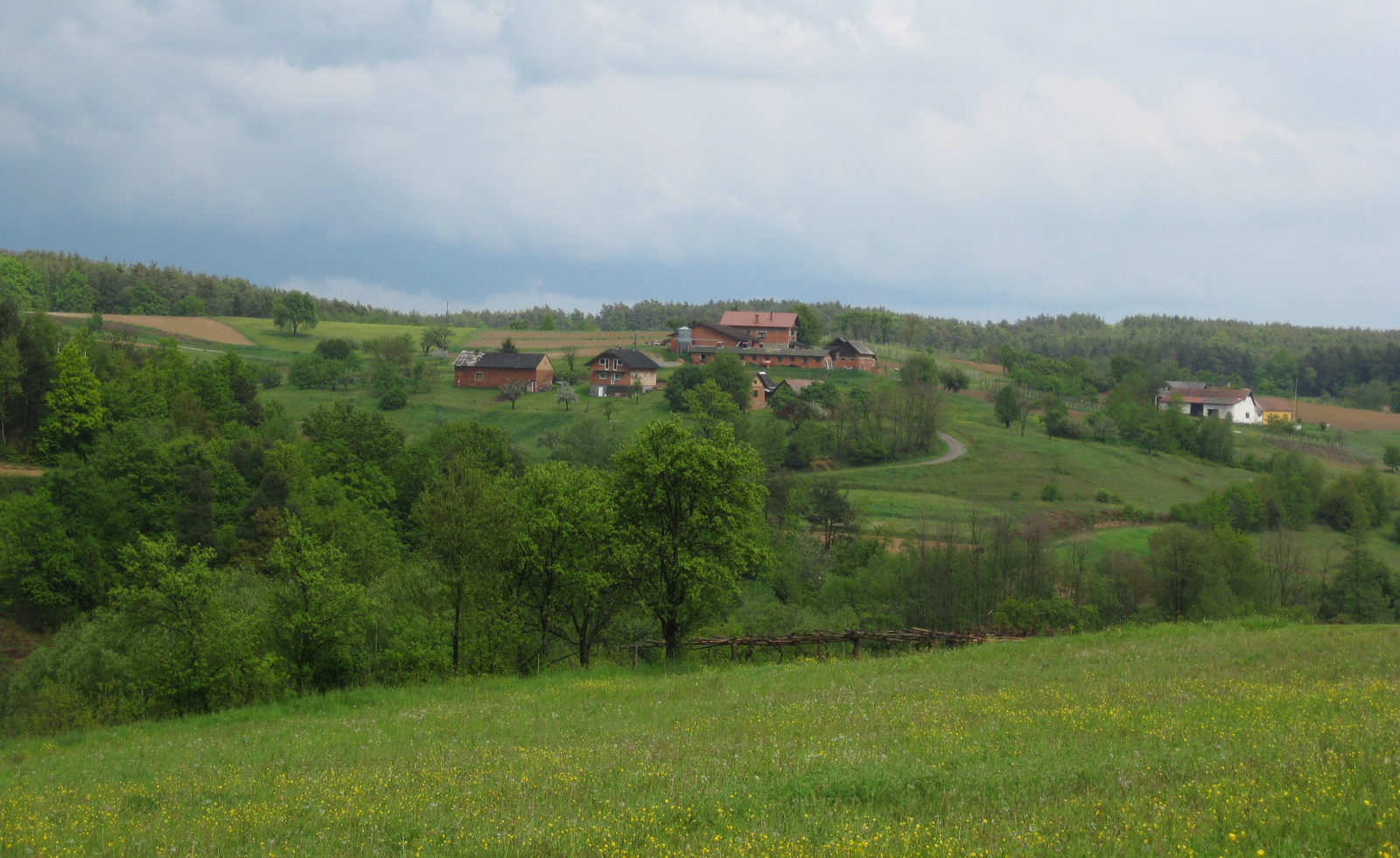

- Location of the Municipality of Gornji Petrovci in Slovenia
- Coordinates: 46°48′N 16°13′E
- Country: Slovenia

Government
  - Mayor: Milan Horvat (Independent)

Area
  - Total: 66.8 km^{2} (25.8 sq mi)

Population (2010)
  - Total: 2,175
  - Density: 32.6/km^{2} (84.3/sq mi)
- Time zone: UTC+01 (CET)
  - Summer (DST): UTC+02 (CEST)
- Website: www.gornji-petrovci.si

The Municipality of Gornji Petrovci (pronounced [ˈɡoːɾnji pɛˈtɾoːu̯tsi]; Slovene: Občina Gornji Petrovci) is a municipality in Slovenia. The seat of the municipality is the town of Gornji Petrovci. The municipality was established in its current form on 3 October 1994, when the former larger Municipality of Murska Sobota was subdivided into nine smaller municipalities.

The municipality includes 14 villages, represented in the municipal coat of arms by fourteen simplified blue houses. The shield also includes a heraldic otter holding a golden fish. The municipal holiday is 18 August, chosen as the anniversary of the crash landing of a stratospheric balloon with the Belgian pioneering balloonists Max Cosyns and Nérée van der Elst in 1934.

The majority of the population of the municipality are Lutherans, making the Municipality of Gornji Petrovci one of the very few Slovenian municipalities with a non-Catholic majority.

== Settlements ==
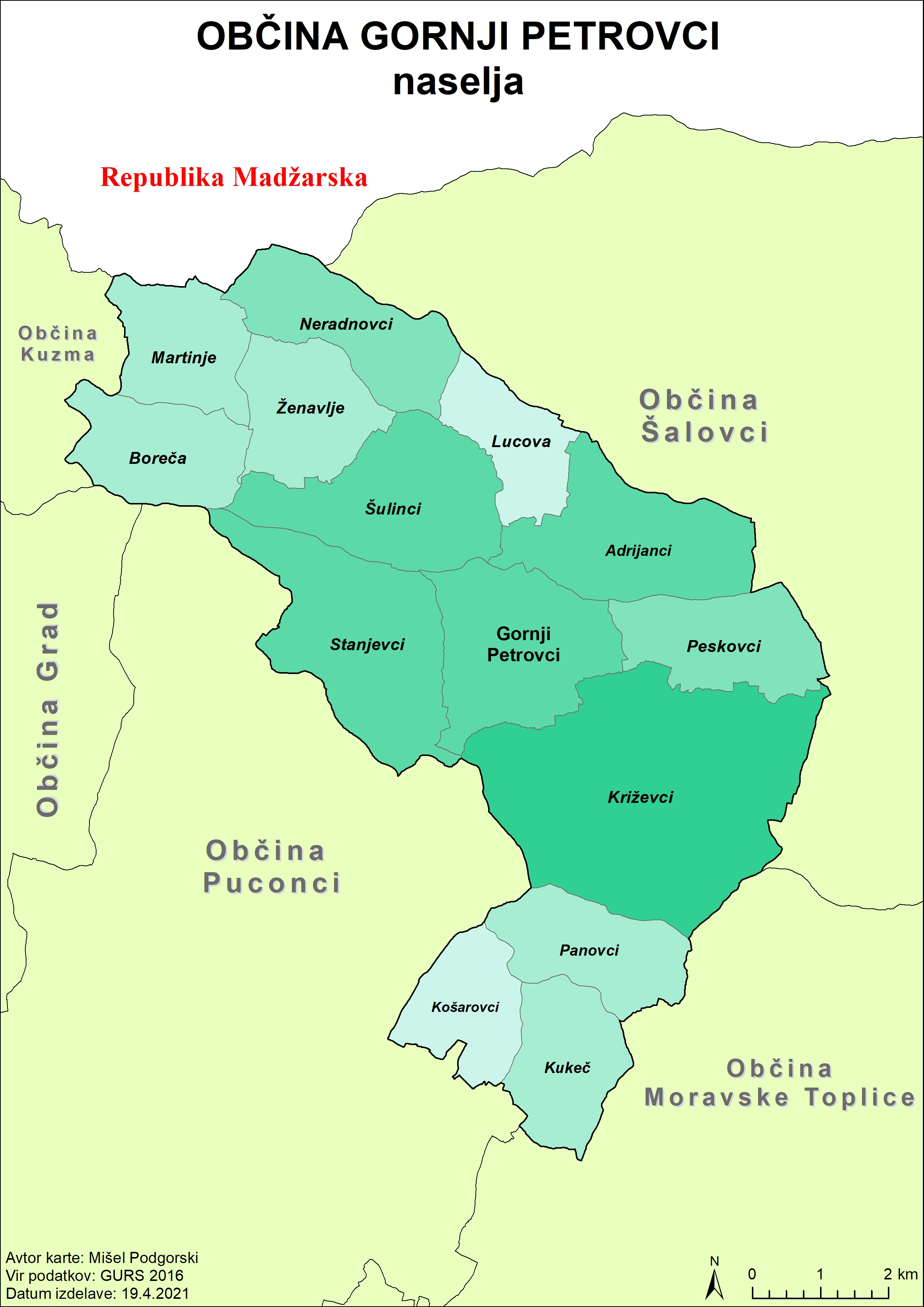
Villages in the municipality

In addition to the municipal seat of Gornji Petrovci, the municipality also includes the following settlements:

- Adrijanci
- Boreča
- Košarovci
- Križevci
- Kukeč
- Lucova
- Martinje
- Neradnovci
- Panovci
- Peskovci
- Stanjevci
- Šulinci
- Ženavlje
