= Neradnovci =

Neradnovci Nádorfa
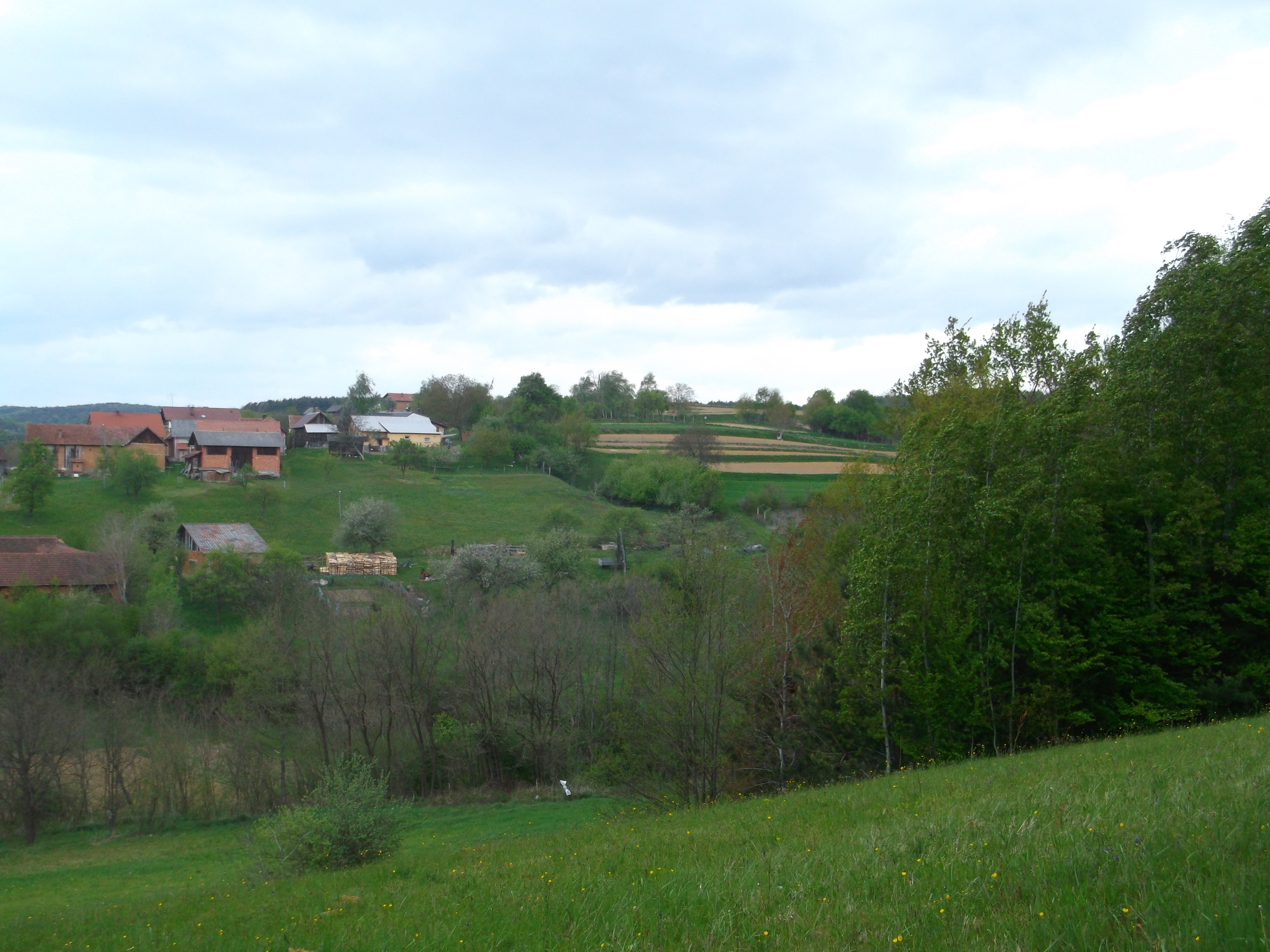

- Location in Slovenia
- Coordinates: 46°50′23.69″N 16°11′41.73″E
- Country: Slovenia
- Traditional region: Prekmurje
- Statistical region: Mura
- Municipality: Gornji Petrovci

Area
  - Total: 4.07 km^{2} (1.57 sq mi)
- Elevation: 290.3 m (952 ft)

Population (2020)
  - Total: 130
  - Density: 32/km^{2} (83/sq mi)

Neradnovci (pronounced [nɛˈɾaːdnɔu̯tsi]; Hungarian: Nádorfa, locally Meranovci) is a small settlement in the Municipality of Gornji Petrovci in the Prekmurje region of Slovenia, close to the border with Hungary.
