= Odranci =

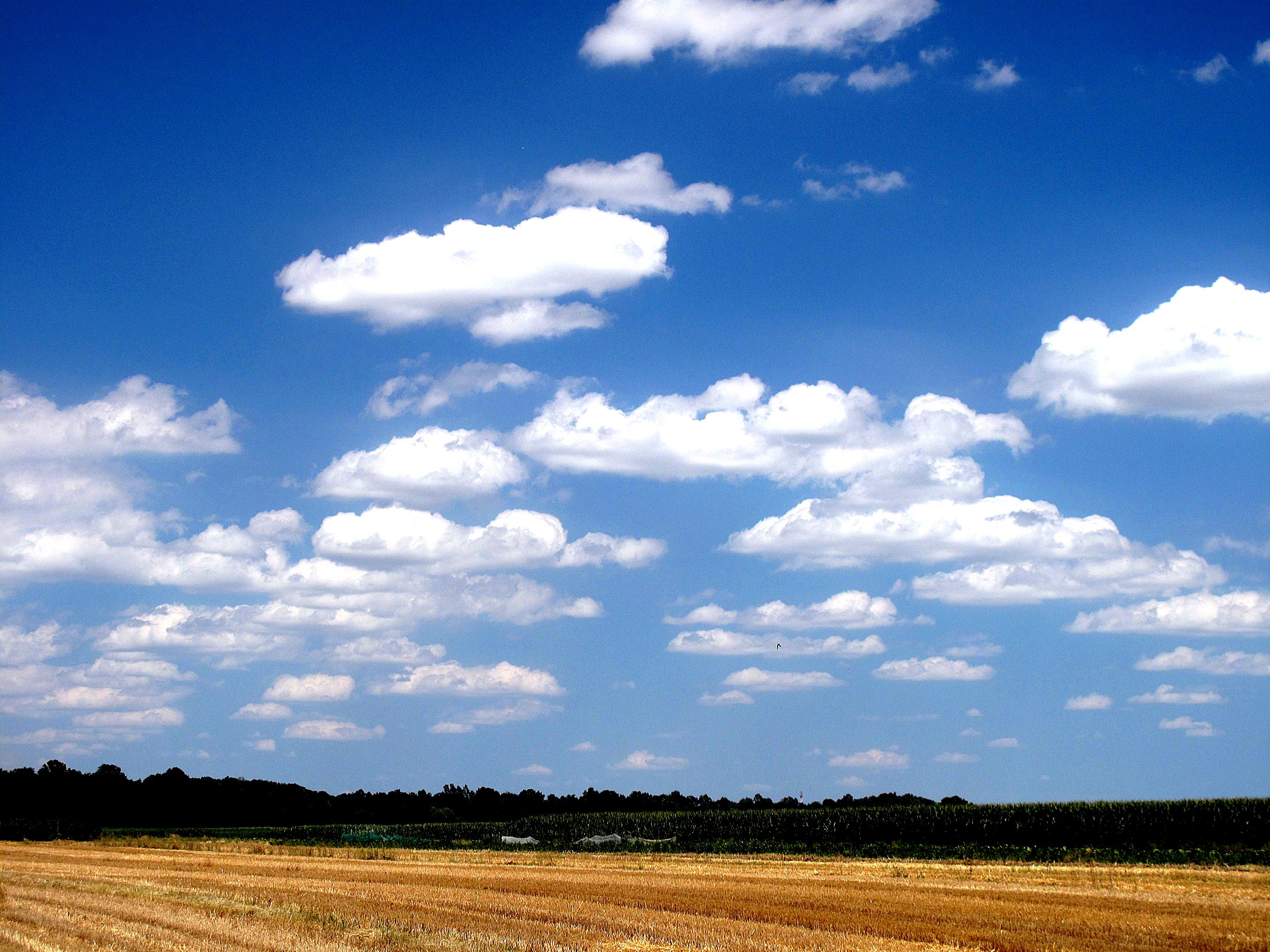

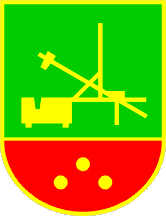
- Coat of arms

- Location in Slovenia
- Coordinates: 46°35′8″N 16°16′31″E
- Country: Slovenia
- Traditional region: Prekmurje
- Statistical region: Mura
- Municipality: Odranci

Area
  - Total: 6.94 km^{2} (2.68 sq mi)
- Elevation: 172.5 m (566 ft)

Population (2019)
  - Total: 1,641

Odranci (pronounced [ɔˈdɾaːntsi]; Hungarian: Adorjánfalva) is a settlement in the Prekmurje region of Slovenia. It is the seat of the Municipality of Odranci and also the only settlement in the municipality. Odranci is the largest settlement of the Dolinsko region, which lies between the Mura and Ledava rivers. Črnec Creek, a tributary of the Ledava, flows through the settlement.

== Name ==
Odranci was attested in written sources in 1322 and 1428 as Adrianch (and as Adryanch in 1389). The name may be derived from *Odьr′anьci, based on the forgotten hydronym *Odьra; if so, the name literally means 'people living along the Odra River'. Another possibility is derivation from *Odr′anьci, based on the Latin name (H)adriānus and meaning 'people living in (H)adrian's settlement'.

== Church ==
The parish church in the settlement is dedicated to the Holy Trinity and belongs to the Murska Sobota Diocese. It was completed in 1967 and is an imposing octagonal building with a low dome and a triple belfry.

== Notable people ==
Notable people that were born or lived in Odranci include:

- Anton Hajdinjak (1894–1938), blacksmith and political agitator
- Lojze Kozar Sr. (1910–1999), priest, writer, and translator
- Lojze Kozar Jr. (born 1958), priest, poet, and writer
