= Stanjevci =

Stanjevci Kerkaszabadhegy
- Location in Slovenia
- Coordinates: 46°48′31.78″N 16°10′56.32″E
- Country: Slovenia
- Traditional region: Prekmurje
- Statistical region: Mura
- Municipality: Gornji Petrovci

Area
  - Total: 6.69 km^{2} (2.58 sq mi)
- Elevation: 310.3 m (1,018 ft)

Population (2020)
  - Total: 186
  - Density: 27.8/km^{2} (72.0/sq mi)

Stanjevci (pronounced [ˈstaːnjɛu̯tsi]; Hungarian: Kerkaszabadhegy, Prekmurje Slovene: Stanjovci) is a village in the Municipality of Gornji Petrovci in the Prekmurje region of Slovenia. The railway from Murska Sobota to Hodoš runs through the settlement, but there is no station in the village.

There is a small chapel north of the main settlement. It was built in 1923 in a Neo-Gothic style.
