= Križevci, Gornji Petrovci =

Križevci
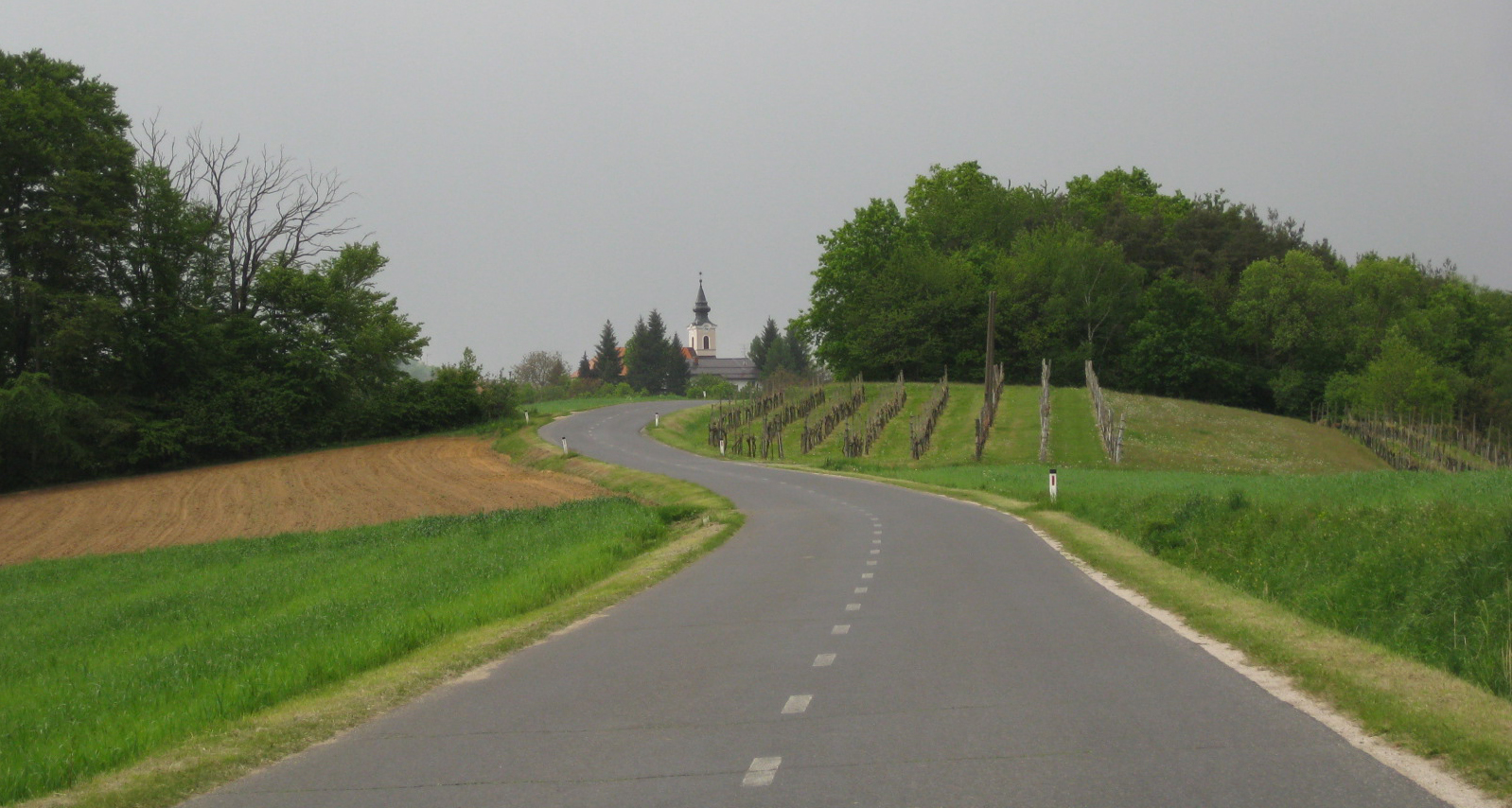

- Location in Slovenia
- Coordinates: 46°47′37.68″N 16°14′31.12″E
- Country: Slovenia
- Traditional region: Prekmurje
- Statistical region: Mura
- Municipality: Gornji Petrovci

Area
  - Total: 13.37 km^{2} (5.16 sq mi)
- Elevation: 283.5 m (930 ft)

Population (2020)
  - Total: 357
  - Density: 26.7/km^{2} (69.2/sq mi)

Križevci (pronounced [ˈkɾiːʒɛu̯tsi]; Hungarian: Keresztúr, in older sources Tótkeresztúr) is a village in the Municipality of Gornji Petrovci in the Prekmurje region of Slovenia.

== Name ==
The name of the settlement was changed from Križevci v Prekmurju to Križevci in 1952. Its name (literally, 'crosses') is derived from a chapel dedicated to the Holy Cross that used to stand in the village, but was pulled down in the late 19th century.

== Cultural heritage ==
There is a large Lutheran church in the village, built in 1785 and enlarged in 1885. It is one of the earliest Lutheran churches in Prekmurje.

== Notable people ==
Notable people that were born or lived in Križevci include:

- János Berke (1814–1908), writer
- Pál Luthár (1839–1919), writer
- Milan Kučan (born 1941), the first president of independent Slovenia
