= Hopper balloon =

Hot air balloon

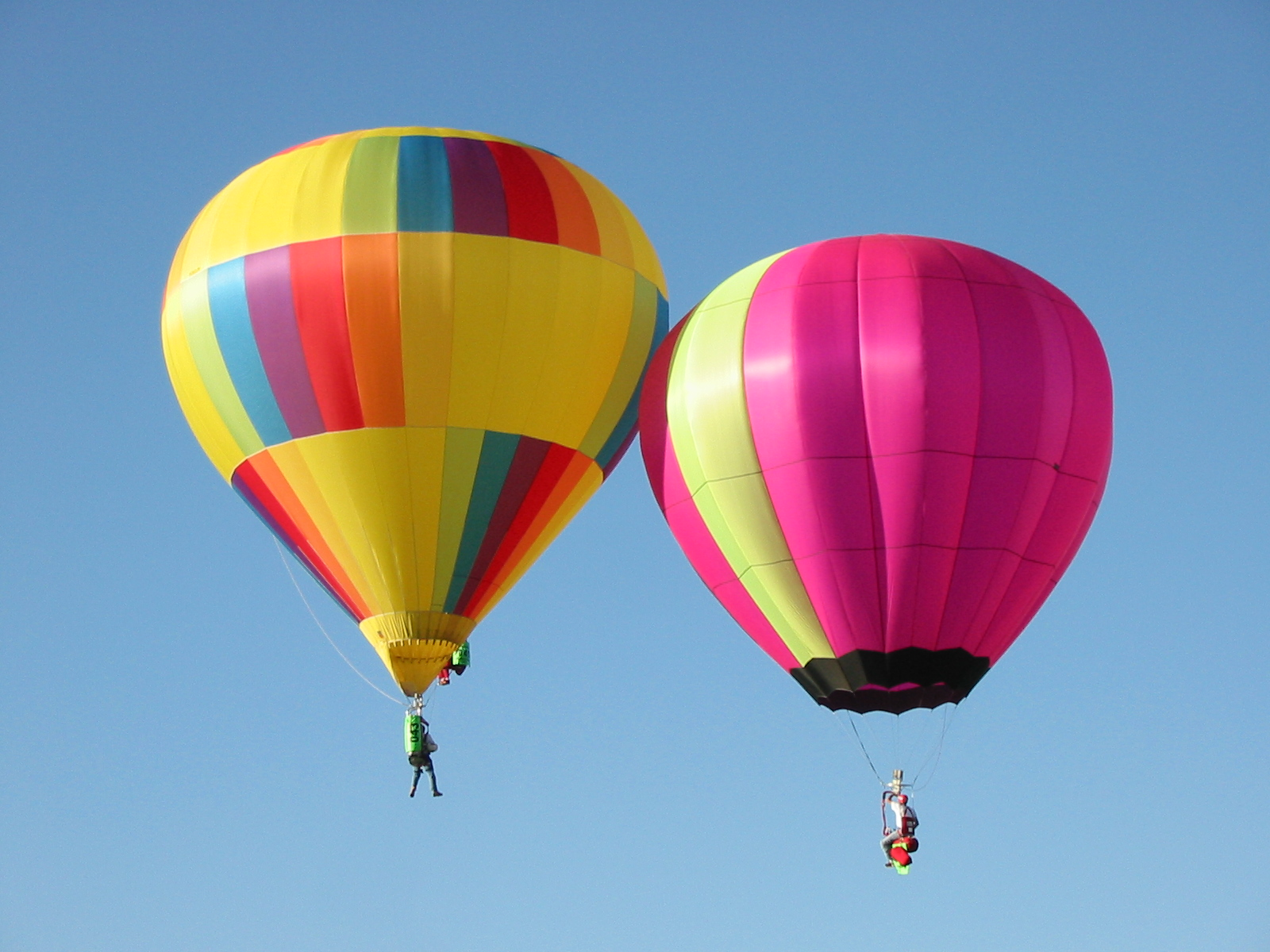
A pair of hopper balloons

A hopper balloon (simply hopper) is a small, one-person hot air balloon. Unlike a conventional hot air balloon where people ride inside a basket, there is no basket on a hopper balloon. Instead, the hopper pilot usually sits on a seat or wears a harness similar to a parachute harness. Hoppers are typically flown for recreation. These aircraft are sometimes called "cloud hoppers" or "cloudhoppers". However, these terms formally refer to the products of a particular manufacturer, specifically Lindstrand Balloons. Nonetheless, "cloudhopper" is used by many people as a genericized trademark, which refers to all craft of this general type. Most hopper balloons have envelopes that range in volume from 14,000 to 35,000 cubic feet (400 to 990 m^{3}) and have a maximum flight duration of 1 to 1.5 hours. The two principal commercial balloon manufacturers today offering hopper balloons for sale are Cameron Balloons and Lindstrand Balloons. Most other hopper balloons are experimental aircraft designed and built by amateur constructors.

== History ==
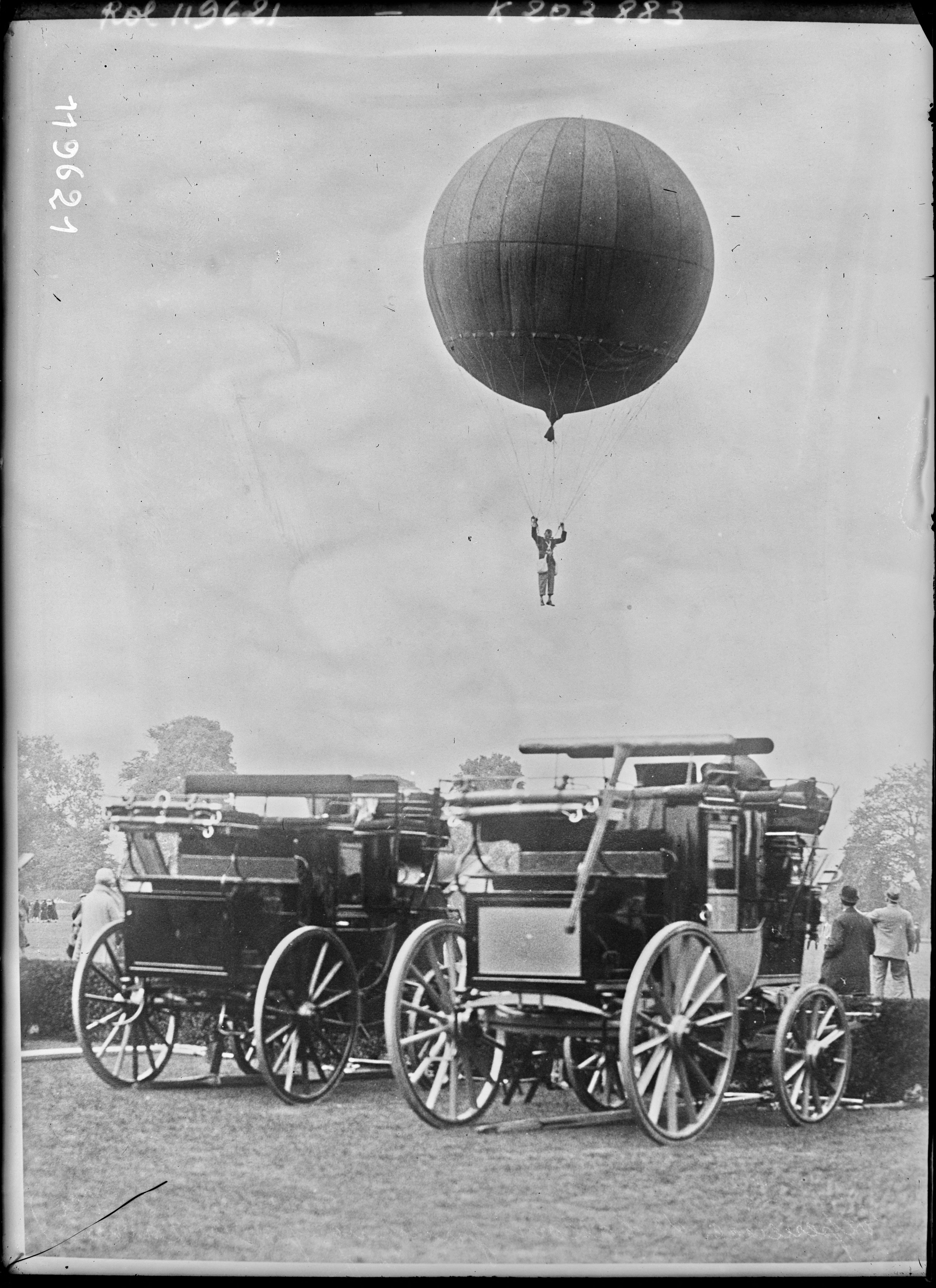
Balloon jumping in the United Kingdom (1927)

Balloon-jumping as a sport emerged in the United States as early as 1923, and in England not later than 1927. Balloon-jumping really meant jumping for many enthusiasts: with insufficient buoyancy to sustain flight, the balloonists actually had to use their muscles to start a balloon-assisted hop. In the United States helium was hailed as the choice lifting gas due to its fire safety, allowing the balloonists to smoke while airborne; elsewhere, hydrogen was common, but hot air balloons were not.

Hopper balloons, or jumping balloons, consisting of nothing more than an air bag and a suspension sling with a primitive bench, were immediately employed by operators of large airships and stratospheric balloons as cheap tools for inspecting and repairing aircraft surfaces. The tool was especially handy, since the safest places to launch large high-altitude balloons (Stratobowl and Crosby, Minnesota iron pits) were located in remote places without real airport facilities. In one instance, the second launch of Georgy Prokofiev's ill-fated USSR-3, it took two hopper balloons to untie the tangled nets on top of the giant balloon: the first jumper fell off his bench but managed to hold on to the balloon's cables and survived.

The first modern hot air balloon was flown by Ed Yost under sponsorship by the U.S. Office of Naval Research on October 22, 1960, in Bruning, Nebraska. Since Yost's balloon had a small envelope of 31,000 cubic feet (880 m^{3}) and a chair for the pilot, not a basket, this was arguably also the first hopper balloon flown since the golden age of airships in the 1930s.

== Cloudhopper ==
The name cloudhopper is often used to refer to a one-person hot air balloon where the pilot sits in a harness or small seat. There is often a propane tank behind the pilot's back, and the burner is on a frame above the pilot's head. Often the balloon's burner, tank, and pilot's harness can swivel independently of the hot air balloon envelope, to let the pilot turn to any direction in flight and for landing.

The term "Cloudhopper" was originally coined and trademarked by British balloonist Colin Prescot. The development of the cloudhopper was carried out by Per Lindstrand of Colt Balloons in 1979. Colt Balloons later merged with Thunder Balloons to form Thunder & Colt Balloons, which inherited the Cloudhopper name. Finally, Per Lindstrand left Thunder & Colt to form his own Lindstrand Balloons, which manufactures the present-day Cloudhopper.

Shortly after the team at Colt built and flew its first Cloudhopper, Cameron Balloons came up with its own backpack-style balloon, called the SkyHopper. Its main distinguishing feature was a twist-grip mounted on an arm rest to control the burner. On the original Colt Cloudhopper, as well as all modern-day cloudhopper designs, the burner controls are mounted at the bottom of the burner, like on regular passenger-carrying hot air balloons.

== See also ==
- Hot air balloon
- Gas balloon
- Cluster ballooning
- Experimental aircraft
- Ultralight aircraft

== Bibliography ==
- "History of the Small Balloon"; Glen Moyer; Balloon Life Magazine (July 1995)
- Ballooning - The Complete Guide to Riding the Winds; Dick Wirth and Jerry Young; London (1980 and 1991)
