= Georgy Prokofiev =

- Born: Georgy Alekseyevich Prokofiev; August 17, 1902; Teleshovo, Vyazma District, Russian Empire
- Died: April 23, 1939 (aged 36); Moscow, Soviet Union
- Occupation: Soviet Air Forces Balloonist
- Years active: 1931 - 1939

Georgy (Yegor) Alekseyevich Prokofiev (born August 17, 1902, in Teleshovo, Vyazma District – died April 23, 1939, in Moscow) was a Soviet Air Forces balloonist who coordinated a military stratospheric balloon program in 1931–1939. On September 30, 1933, USSR-1 under Prokofiev's command set an unofficial world altitude record of 18,501 metres (60,699 ft).

== Background ==
Born in a peasant family in the former Smolensk Governorate, Yegor Prokofiev received a basic education during World War I and worked in the Vyazma railroad yards starting at the age of fifteen. He joined the Bolshevik party in 1920 and in the same year was mobilized into the Red Army for the Polish–Soviet War. After 1921 he held unimportant bureaucratic jobs in Komsomol offices in Smolensk and Moscow until joining the Red Army again, as the political commissar of a balloon unit based in Kuntsevo, then a suburb of Moscow. Prokofiev became an avid balloonist himself, soon assuming the command of the First Airship Division, and turned out to be an effective project manager for the early efforts of the Soviet stratospheric program.

== USSR-1 ==
In December 1932 Vladimir Chizhevsky proposed a detailed description of a balloon configuration capable of beating Auguste Piccard's altitude record. The military supported the project, named USSR-1, and Prokofiev assumed the role of its leader, coordinating efforts by military and civilian designers and technologists. Consolidation of practically all available expertise and rigorous safety enforcement resulted in a sound and safe design (unlike the ill-fated contemporary Osoaviakhim-1).

The widely publicized maiden flight, scheduled on September 24, 1933, ended in a humiliating failure. First, when the envelope was already inflated, it was found that the bottom of the envelope dangerously mingled with the ropes. A volunteer, someone named Fyodor Tereschenko, climbed the ropes and released the knots. USSR-1 was then cleared to fly, but failed to lift off due to moisture buildup in foggy weather.

The next attempt to launch USSR-1 was scheduled on September 30, 1933. Prokofiev, Konstantin Godunov and co-pilot Ernst Birnbaum lifted off at 8:40 Moscow Time and established radio contact with ground five minutes later. According to Prokofiev's flight log, at 9:17 USSR-1 passed 16,800 meter mark, beating Piccard's record; between 9:19 and 9:26 the aircraft, fully expanded, levelled in a static equilibrium at 17,500 meters. Prokofiev released 80 kilograms of ballast to proceed further; after additional ballast drops at 9:47, 10:30, 11:40 and 12:00 the aircraft resumed slow ascent and at 12:55 reached 19,200–19,300 meters. Later, Prokofiev's numbers were adjusted for instrument errors to 19,000 meters max altitude at 12:45. Descent to 10,500 meters took around two hours; at this altitude the crew discharged all electrical batteries as a precaution against a short circuit during landing. At 16:36 (8,000 meters) Prokofiev stopped recording flight data and concentrated on airspeed control; around 17:00 the aircraft softly landed on a field near the town of Kolomna, around 110 kilometers (68 mi) from the launch site.

The USSR-1 altitude record, although not recognized by FAI, was publicized worldwide, as well as scientific data released shortly after the flight. The crew members, three designers and plant manager responsible for building USSR-1 were awarded the Order of Lenin, then the highest award for military or civil achievement.

== USSR-2 ==
After the 1933 success Prokofiev emerged as an undisputed leader and expert in ballooning and directed subsequent flights of USSR-1 Bis (1935) and the investigation of Osoaviakhim-1 crash of 1934.

In May 1934 Prokofiev received a go-ahead to proceed with a new gigantic (300,000 cubic meters) balloon, the USSR-2 designed by Chizhevsky and Godunov to reach 30 kilometers altitude. If flown successfully, it could have become the first operational aircraft designed for pilots wearing pressure suits. Prokofiev and Godunov themselves planned to fly the new balloon that, unlike earlier and later Soviet designs, seated only two. The gondola of USSR-2 had an airlock attachment to allow exit into the stratosphere without explosive decompression. Instead of cotton fabric, its gas bag was made of parachute-grade silk, a choice that killed the project. On the night of September 4–5, 1934, as the ground crews pumped hydrogen into the silk bag, an unexpected static spark caused by the friction of unfolding silk ignited the balloon. There were no fatalities on the ground but the project was shelved indefinitely.

== USSR-3 ==
After 1934 Prokofiev coordinated a new project – USSR-3. At 157,000 cubic meters volume and nearly 130 meters tall in launch configuration, the hydrogen-filled USSR-3 would have been the second largest Soviet balloon after the failed USSR-2. Launching a balloon of this size from Russian plains turned out to be a futile race against weather, as even a slight wind prevented safe deployment of the gigantic gas bag. American balloonists solved the wind challenge by launching from deep canyons (Stratobowl) or mining pits (Crosby, Minnesota) while Soviet Air Forces relied on the single airfield in Moscow suburbs. To alleviate the problem, Prokofiev designed the double launch sequence. Prior to launch, the balloon was pulled down to the gondola with temporary ropes wound around permanent suspension cables, halving the balloon's height. These ropes were designed to untangle and release the full length of suspension cables shortly after launch. The first test of Prokofiev's invention on a small 900 cubic meters balloon ended in the death of test pilot. Prokofiev prepared a second attempt (on a larger aircraft) and safely tested it himself. Later experience demonstrated that the system remained unsafe.

On September 18, 1937, the redesigned USSR-3 with Prokofiev, Krikun and Semyonov on board attempted liftoff from Kuntsevo field employing the double launch procedure. At about 700–800 meters the temporary ropes failed to untangle correctly and accidentally damaged the gas release valve. The aircraft dived and the crew who had no time to bail out on personal parachutes suffered internal injuries on ground impact.

The last attempt to launch USSR-3 on March 16, 1939, ended in a similar debacle. Prior to launch, the ground team failed to release the balloon from a safety net holding it to the ground; two balloonists on small single-seat hopper balloons were sent to untangle the net. At about 1,200 meters altitude during the double launch sequence the valve was ripped open, again, and the balloon crashed in the woods halfway between Kuntsevo and downtown Moscow; the crew (Prokofiev, Semyonov, Prilutsky) survived with serious injuries. According to Semyonov, Prokofiev, who stood in the open top hatch of the gondola, could bail out easily but preferred to stay on board to the end.

At first it appeared that Prokofiev escaped practically uninjured, but hospital examination revealed two shattered vertebrae, feet and intestinal injuries. Journalist Lazar Brontman who spoke to Prokofiev in the hospital on April 4, 1939, recalled that Prokofiev was planning a sequence of new record flights on or after May 10, 1939, depending on weather conditions. However, on April 23 Prokofiev fatally shot himself. He was buried with military honors at Novodevichy Cemetery.

== Sources ==
- Brontman, Lazar (1939). "Diaries, 1939-1940 (in Russian)".
- Druzhinin, Yu. A. (2006). "Polyoty v stratosfery v SSSR v 1930-e g. (Полёты в стратосферу в СССР в 1930-е г.)". Voprosy istorii estestvoznania i tehniki (in Russian) (4). Archived from the original on 2010-12-06.
- Garry, A., Kassil, L. (1934). Potolok mira (Потолок мира). Moscow.
- Istochnik journal staff (1997). "Dokumenty o katastrophe stratostata Osoaviakhim-1 (Документы о катастрофе стратостата Осоавиахим-1)". Istochnik (in Russian) (2).
- Ryan, Craig (2003). The Pre-Astronauts. Naval Institute Press. ISBN 978-1-59114-748-0.
- Shayler, David (2000). Disasters and accidents in manned spaceflight. Springer. pp. 20–22. ISBN 978-1-85233-225-9.
