= Panovci =

Panovci Úriszék
- Location in Slovenia
- Coordinates: 46°45′39.38″N 16°13′38.91″E
- Country: Slovenia
- Traditional region: Prekmurje
- Statistical region: Mura
- Municipality: Gornji Petrovci

Area
  - Total: 3.52 km^{2} (1.36 sq mi)
- Elevation: 361.4 m (1,186 ft)

Population (2020)
  - Total: 33
  - Density: 9.4/km^{2} (24/sq mi)

Panovci (pronounced [ˈpaːnɔu̯tsi]; Hungarian: Úriszék) is a small settlement in the Municipality of Gornji Petrovci in the Prekmurje region of Slovenia.
