= Šulinci =

Šulinci Sándorvölgy
- Location in Slovenia
- Coordinates: 46°49′39.81″N 16°11′56.8″E
- Country: Slovenia
- Traditional region: Prekmurje
- Statistical region: Mura
- Municipality: Gornji Petrovci

Area
  - Total: 5.64 km^{2} (2.18 sq mi)
- Elevation: 292.5 m (960 ft)

Population (2020)
  - Total: 151
  - Density: 26.8/km^{2} (69.3/sq mi)

Šulinci (pronounced [ˈʃuːlintsi]; Hungarian: Sándorvölgy, Prekmurje Slovene: Šülinci) is a village in the Municipality of Gornji Petrovci in the Prekmurje region of Slovenia.

The old village school, built in 1913 and closed in 1962, now functions as a village hall.
