= Adrijanci =

Adrijanci Andorháza
- Location in Slovenia
- Coordinates: 46°49′9.33″N 16°14′31.34″E
- Country: Slovenia
- Traditional region: Prekmurje
- Statistical region: Mura
- Municipality: Gornji Petrovci

Area
  - Total: 5.31 km^{2} (2.05 sq mi)
- Elevation: 257.4 m (844 ft)

Population (2020)
  - Total: 134
  - Density: 25.2/km^{2} (65.4/sq mi)

Adrijanci (pronounced [adɾiˈjaːntsi]; Hungarian: Andorháza) is a village in the Municipality of Gornji Petrovci in the Prekmurje region of Slovenia.

There is a small chapel in the village built at the beginning of the 20th century. It is used as a funeral home and the original hearse is preserved inside the building. It has a three-storey belfry.
