= Košarovci =

Košarovci Kosárháza
- Location in Slovenia
- Coordinates: 46°45′24.84″N 16°12′4.32″E
- Country: Slovenia
- Traditional region: Prekmurje
- Statistical region: Mura
- Municipality: Gornji Petrovci

Area
  - Total: 2.89 km^{2} (1.12 sq mi)
- Elevation: 323.2 m (1,060 ft)

Population (2020)
  - Total: 67
  - Density: 23/km^{2} (60/sq mi)

Košarovci (pronounced [kɔˈʃaːɾɔu̯tsi], Hungarian: Kosárháza) is a small village in the Municipality of Gornji Petrovci in the Prekmurje region of Slovenia.
