= Lucova =

Lucova Lakháza
- Location in Slovenia
- Coordinates: 46°49′47.33″N 16°12′51.23″E
- Country: Slovenia
- Traditional region: Prekmurje
- Statistical region: Mura
- Municipality: Gornji Petrovci

Area
  - Total: 2.66 km^{2} (1.03 sq mi)
- Elevation: 283.9 m (931 ft)

Population (2020)
  - Total: 106
  - Density: 39.8/km^{2} (103/sq mi)

Lucova (pronounced [ˈluːtsɔʋa]; Hungarian: Lakháza, Prekmurje Slovene: Lücova) is a small settlement in the Municipality of Gornji Petrovci in the Prekmurje region of Slovenia.

There is a small church in the village. It was built in 1926 in a Neo-Gothic style.
