= Ženavlje =

Ženavlje Gyanafa
- Location in Slovenia
- Coordinates: 46°50′20.45″N 16°10′38.88″E
- Country: Slovenia
- Traditional region: Prekmurje
- Statistical region: Mura
- Municipality: Gornji Petrovci

Area
  - Total: 3.53 km^{2} (1.36 sq mi)
- Elevation: 349.4 m (1,146 ft)

Population (2020)
  - Total: 97
  - Density: 27/km^{2} (71/sq mi)

Ženavlje (pronounced [ʒɛˈnaːu̯ljɛ]; Hungarian: Gyanafa, Prekmurje Slovene: Ženavle) is a village in the Municipality of Gornji Petrovci in the Prekmurje region of Slovenia.

Ženavlje is known as the unplanned landing site of a stratospheric balloon with the Belgian pioneering balloonist Max Cosyns and his student Nérée van der Elst on 18 August 1934. The 18th of August was declared a municipal holiday and in 1997 a large bronze monument in the shape of a balloon was erected on the spot of the crash landing to commemorate the event.
