= Lojze Kozar Sr. =

Roman Catholic priest

- Born: Kozár Alajos; November 11, 1910; Martinje, Austria-Hungary
- Died: April 29, 1999 (aged 88); Odranci, Slovenia
- Occupations: Priest, writer, translator

Lojze Kozar Sr. (born Kozár Alajos; November 11, 1910 – April 29, 1999), was a Slovene Roman Catholic priest, writer, and translator. He was the uncle of the priest, writer, and poet Lojze Kozar Jr.
