= Thomas G. W. Settle =

United States Navy admiral

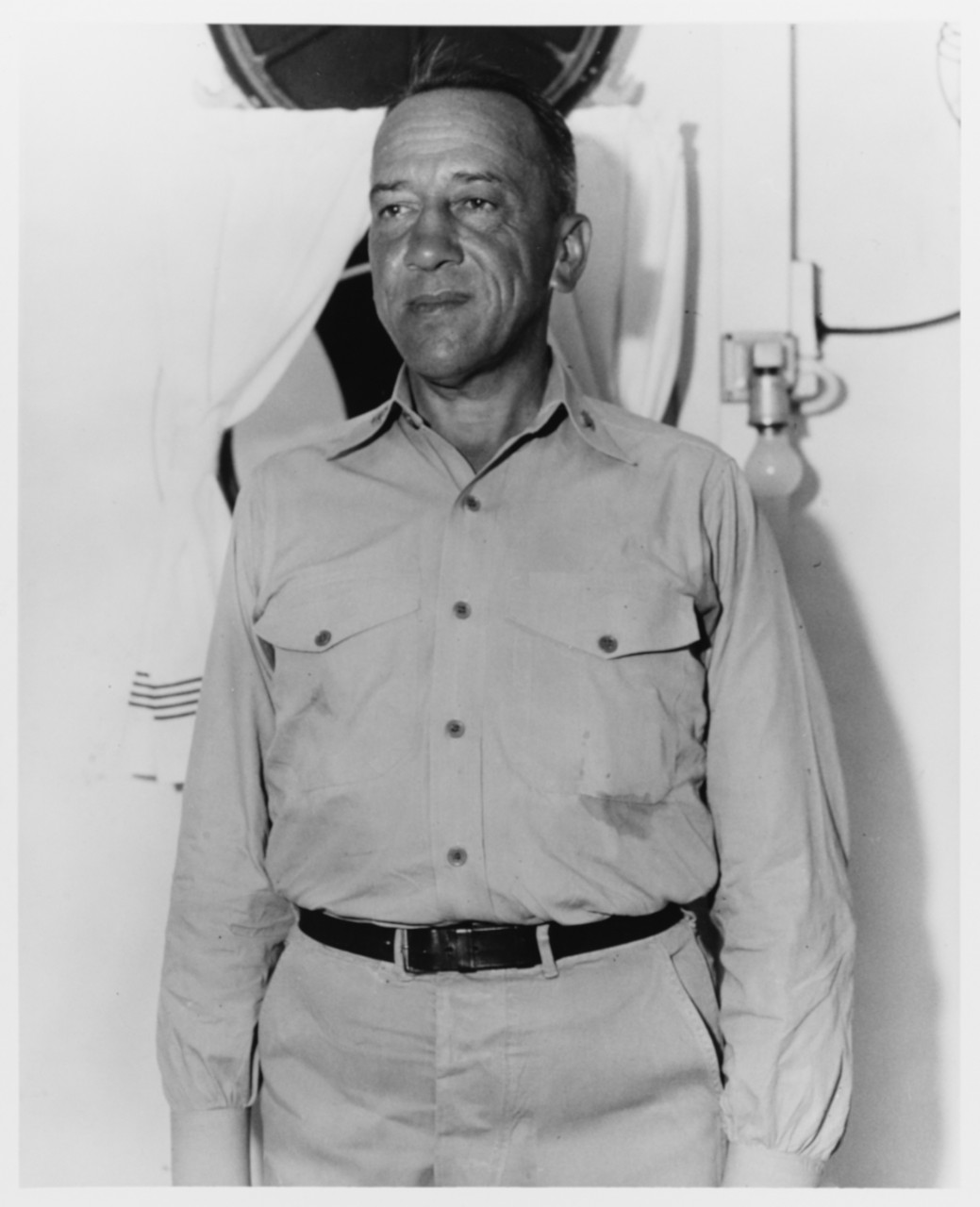
- Settle during World War II.
- Born: November 4, 1895; Washington, D.C., U.S.
- Died: April 28, 1980 (aged 84); Bethesda, Maryland, U.S.
- Military career
- Allegiance: United States of America
- Branch: United States Navy
- Service years: 1918–1957
- Rank: Vice Admiral
- Nickname: Tex
- Commands: Cruiser Division Two; USS Portland (CA-33); USS Monocacy (PG-20); USS Palos (PG-16)
- Conflicts: World War I World War II: Battle of Surigao Strait; Invasion of Lingayen Gulf; Battle of Okinawa
- Awards: Navy Cross; Legion of Merit; Bronze Star Medal

Thomas Greenhow Williams "Tex" Settle (November 4, 1895 – April 28, 1980) was an officer of the United States Navy who on November 20, 1933, together with Army major Chester L. Fordney, set a world altitude record in the Century of Progress stratospheric balloon. An experienced balloonist, long-time flight instructor, and officer on the airships USS Shenandoah (ZR-1) and USS Los Angeles (ZR-3), Settle won the Litchfield Trophy in 1929 and 1931, the International Gordon Bennett Race in 1932, the Harmon Aeronaut Trophy for 1933, and the Harmon National Trophy for 1932 and 1933. He also set numerous distance and endurance records.

In 1934 Settle transferred to sailing duties, initially as captain of the China-based USS Palos (PG-16). In 1944–1945 he commanded the heavy cruiser USS Portland (CA-33), earning the Navy Cross for his action in the Battle of Surigao Strait. After World War II Vice Admiral Settle held Navy appointments in the continental United States and overseas, and was charged with tasks ranging from distributing international aid to Greece and Turkey to conducting nuclear tests in the Aleutian Islands.

== Early career ==
Settle graduated from the United States Naval Academy in 1918, second in his class, and began his naval career as an ensign on the destroyers USS Sampson (DD-63), USS Chew (DD-106) and USS Whipple (DD-217). During his time as a naval officer in the Black Sea at the time of the Russian civil war Settle helped the Russian composer Sergei Bortkiewicz (1877–1952) in Yalta and Constantinople in 1920. As a gratitude for his help Bortkiewicz dedicated his piano cycle Der kleine Wanderer opus 21 to Settle. The nickname "Tex" dates back to his Academy years. After these assignment he attended the Cruft High Tension Laboratory of Harvard University, graduating as a communications engineer in the summer of 1924.

Settle married Fay Brackett, an employee of Cruft Laboratory, in June 1924, and in July assumed his next Navy assignment, that of communications officer on USS Shenandoah (ZR-1), a rigid, 207-meter airship based at Lakehurst Naval Air Station. When the newly built USS Los Angeles (ZR-3) arrived at Lakehurst later in October 1924, Settle was appointed its communications officer as well; dual appointments were possible because helium supplies allowed flying only one airship at a time.

== Airship pilot ==
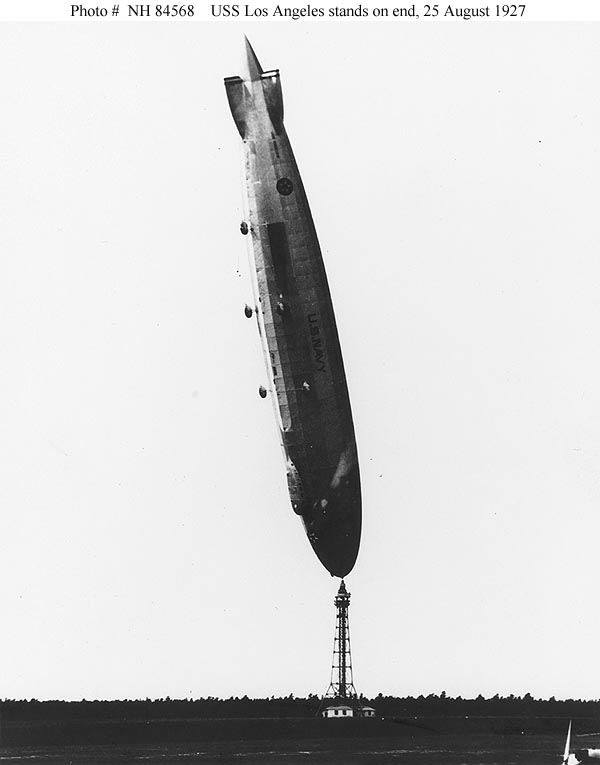
August 25, 1927. Los Angeles rotates around the mooring mast, Settle in the control car.

On the day when Shenandoah crashed, Settle was training alone in a captive kite balloon. After the crash he volunteered for airship pilot training and received his Naval Aviator's (Airship) wings No. 3350 on January 19, 1927. Settle also wanted to train as an airplane pilot, but Admiral Moffett declined his requests. Soon he flew a small balloon for 21 hours over 478 miles (769 km)—a flight that could make a world distance record had it been equipped with a barograph.

On August 25, 1927, when captain Charles E. Rosendahl was on the ground, Settle happened be the senior officer on board Los Angeles when the airship, tied to a mooring mast, literally "stood on its nose". At 13:29 a sudden cold weather front hit Los Angeles; the resulting increase in the buoyancy of the airship, warmed by sunlight, pushed it upward. The tail freely went up while the nose remained tied to the tower. Settle requested Rosendahl's permission to disengage from the tower, but the captain "saw no need for it". Winds threw the tail further upward; Settle sent the men into the tail, but Los Angeles kept rising until reaching a nearly vertical (88 degrees) nose-down position. The airship slowly rotated back; Settle called his men back and released aft balance, saving Los Angeles from a tail-first impact. Los Angeles survived the accident and served until 1932, performing 331 flights without major accidents or fatalities.

== Test pilot ==
Later Settle piloted different types of airships stationed at Lakehurst. In January 1928 Settle nearly drowned at sea when his J-3 non-rigid airship carrying trainee pilots lost power and was swept into the Atlantic; the crew managed to restart the engines and reach Lakehurst. As a flight instructor, Settle—although an aviator himself—was known for merciless airborne training drills and advocated abolition of flight pay incentives, convinced that they attracted "deadwood" into naval aviation. In October 1928 Settle crossed the Atlantic on board Graf Zeppelin together with two other Navy observers. Inspired by the reliability of German airships, he publicly denounced United States dependence on German Maybach engines.

Settle spent the first half of 1929 in the Akron, Ohio hangars of Goodyear-Zeppelin, supervising construction of the future USS Akron (ZRS-4) and USS Macon (ZRS-5), threatened by saboteurs. In 1930 he tested captive sailplanes carried by Los Angeles, where he remained the second in command. In 1931 Settle became the first pilot of K-1, the first U. S. Navy non-rigid airship with an internally suspended control car, and the first using propane as engine fuel. K-1 remained the sole specimen of its type; the Navy considered it too large for its tasks.

== Balloon races ==
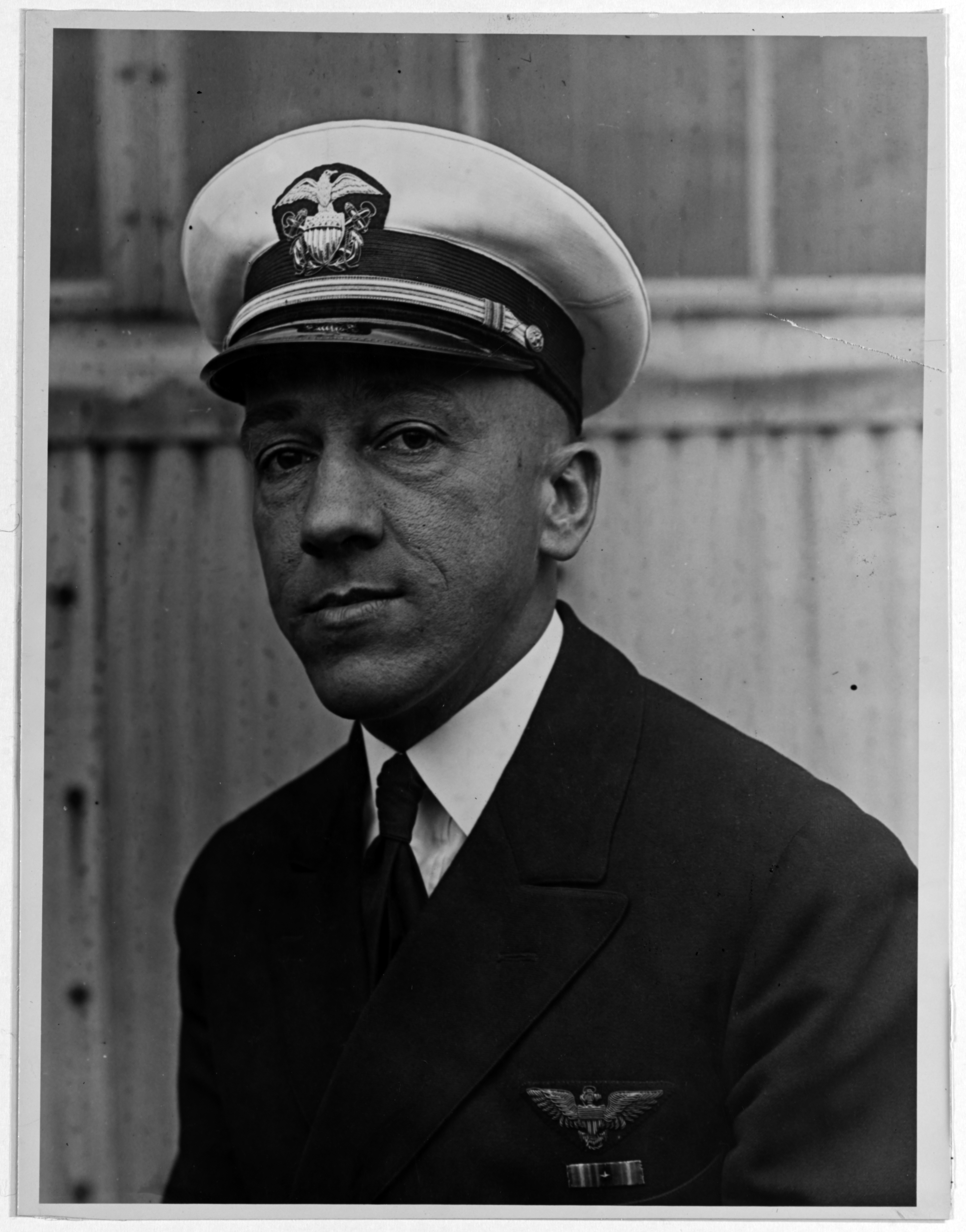
Settle as Lieutenant in 1928.

Settle entered his first balloon race together with George N. Stevens on May 30, 1927. They had to ground their 35,000 cubic feet (990 m^{3}) balloon due to heavy rain after only 393 miles (632 km) in flight, losing the race. This incident motivated Settle to seek all possible cooperation from Navy meteorologists in the future. Settle became the definitive Navy competitor in national and, when qualified, international gas balloon races:

- In May 1928 Settle withdrew early from the National Race in Pittsburgh, where lightning strikes downed three balloons, killing two pilots and injuring four.
- In May 1929 Settle and ensign Wilfred Bushnell competed at the National Race, winning the Litchfield Trophy with a 952 miles (1,532 km) flight which set a world record in three balloon categories and qualified them for the International Balloon Race.
- In July 1931 Settle and Bushnell (now lieutenant) won their second Litchfield Trophy.
- In September 1932 Settle and Bushnell won the International Gordon Bennett Race with a 963 miles (1,550 km) record flight from Basel to Vilnius. The flight earned Settle his first national Harmon Trophy.
- In September 1933 Settle and lieutenant Kendall made a 776 miles (1,249 km) flight, setting a world endurance record but only coming second in the International Gordon Bennett Race, losing in distance to the Polish team of Franciszek Hynek and Zbigniew Burzyński.

== Century of Progress ==
Universal newsreel footage about the failed launch attempt

November 21, 1933. New Jersey police rescue Settle (left) and Fordney from the swamp.

In 1932 the board of the Century of Progress trade show, to be held in Chicago in summer 1933, invited renowned Swiss balloonist Auguste Piccard to perform a high-altitude flight at the fairgrounds. Auguste declined, recommending his twin brother Jean instead. Jean took the lead, but did not have a U. S. flight license, so the Piccards invited Settle to fly the balloon. Named for the show, Century of Progress was built in America with a gondola donated by Dow Chemical, a gas bag from Goodyear-Zeppelin, hydrogen donated by Union Carbide, and scientific instruments supplied by Arthur Compton and Robert Millikan .

The first flight from Soldier Field, with Settle alone on board, attracted thousands of spectators and ended in a flop. Moments after liftoff, an open gas release valve forced Century to fall in a nearby railroad yard.

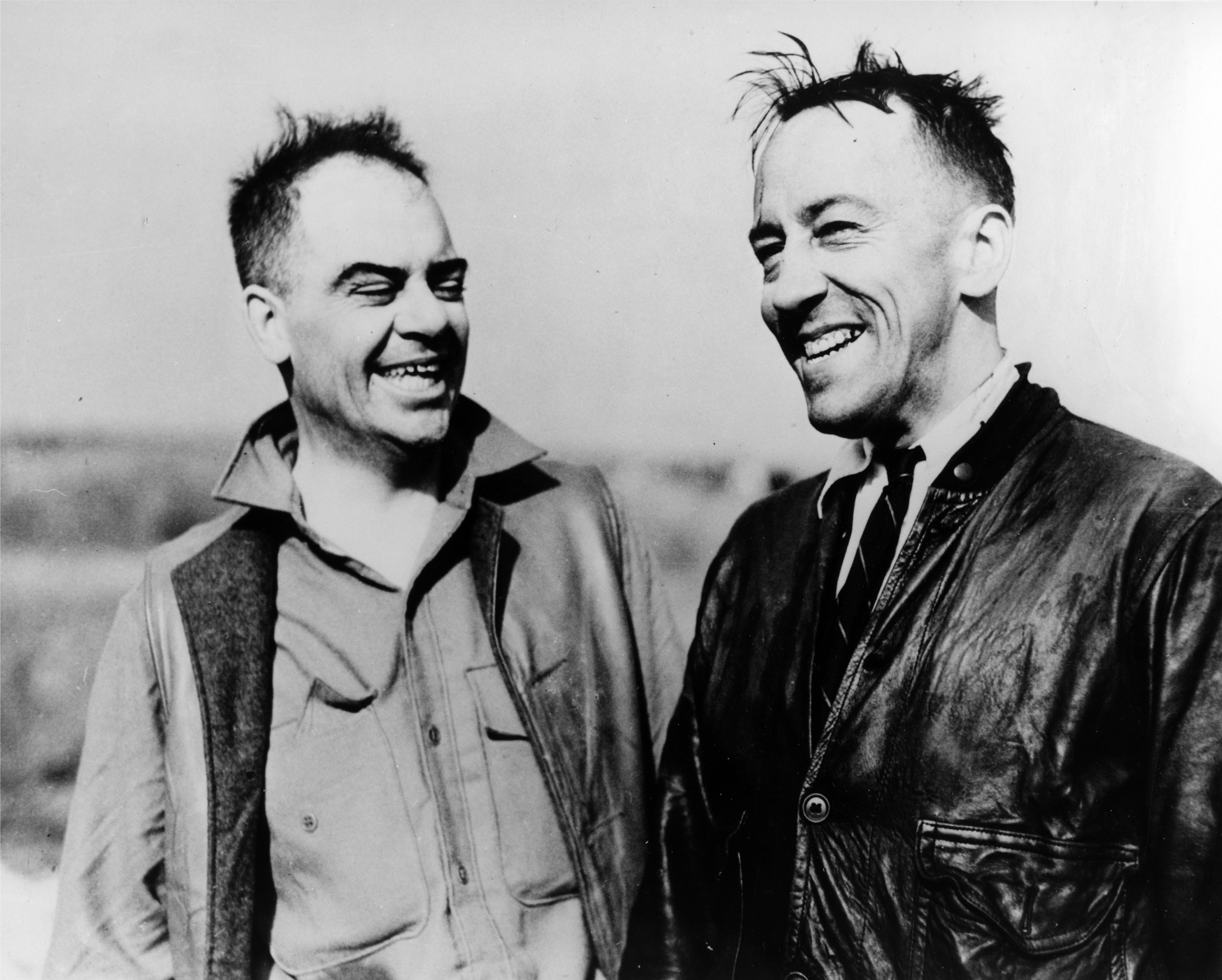
Settle and Fordney

For the next flight the Marine Corps recommended their representative, Major Chester L. Fordney, to join Settle as instrument operator (the experiments were vital to justify financing of the flight). Fordney himself "was crazy for tying up with an adventurer like Settle". On November 20 they lifted off from the Goodyear-Zeppelin facilities in Akron, Ohio, watched by only a few hundred spectators. Nevertheless, the flight received national publicity as radio transmissions from the stratosphere were broadcast on radio networks. Century floated at peak altitude for two hours, and landed softly in Bridgeton, New Jersey marshes in the confluence of Delaware and Cohansey rivers, incidentally, a few miles from Jean Piccard's home. It was already dark, so Settle and Fordney spent the night in the chilling cold of the gondola. They dumped radio batteries during descent, so in the morning Fordney waded five miles through the swamp in search for help. The balloon's barograph, examined by the National Bureau of Standards, confirmed the world altitude record of 18,665 meters (61,237 feet). The flight earned Settle the Harmon Trophy and the FAI Henri de la Vaulx medal. Earlier in 1933 the USSR-1 had flown to 62,230 feet, but it was not recognized by the FAI, so Settle and Fordney became the official record holder until the flight of Explorer II in 1935.

The Piccards retained Century of Progress; while piloting the airship in October 1934, Jeannette Piccard became the first woman to reach the stratosphere.

== USS Palos ==
Shortly before the record ascent, Settle applied for a transfer to sea duty. In the second half of 1934 Settle arrived in China, tasked with sailing USS Palos (PG-16) 1,300 miles (2,100 km) up the Yangtze River from Wusong to Chongqing. Palos, a gunboat stationed around Shanghai since 1914, had recently been refitted and over time became twice as heavy against her original displacement (340 vs. 180 tons), making her hardly capable of the upstream journey. In 1929 alone, of 67 Yangtze steamers three were totally destroyed by the rapids with 47 casualties; a thousand junk sailors perished every year.

The boat left Wusong on October 1, passing Hankou (the last "western" city on the route) on October 11. At Yichang Settle disembarked, leaving the boat and its crew to prepare for forcing the rapids, and himself took a reconnaissance trip to Chongqing on a British steamer. He returned just as the water level fell below optimum, and immediately ordered departure. Balancing engine thrust, steering, and pulling the boat by cables, and struggling to avoid downstream-bound junks, Settle managed to get Palos through the rocky rapids. On November 12, 1934, Palos reached Chongqing where it was eventually decommissioned in 1937; the hulk was still afloat in 1939.

After the Palos journey Settle remained on the Yangtze, now in command of another old gunboat, USS Monocacy (PG-20). In 1939–1941 Settle attended the Naval War College.

== USS Portland ==
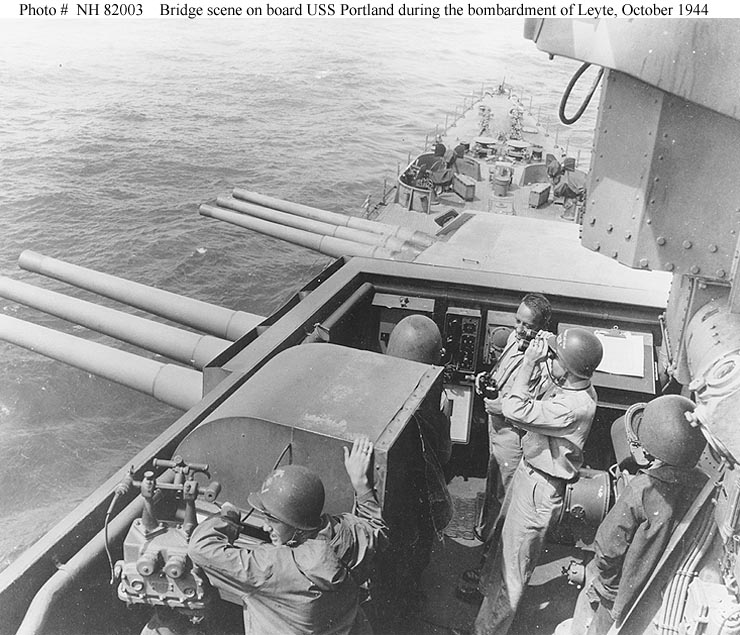
Captain Settle (top right, without helmet) on the bridge of USS Portland (CA-33) during bombardment of Leyte.

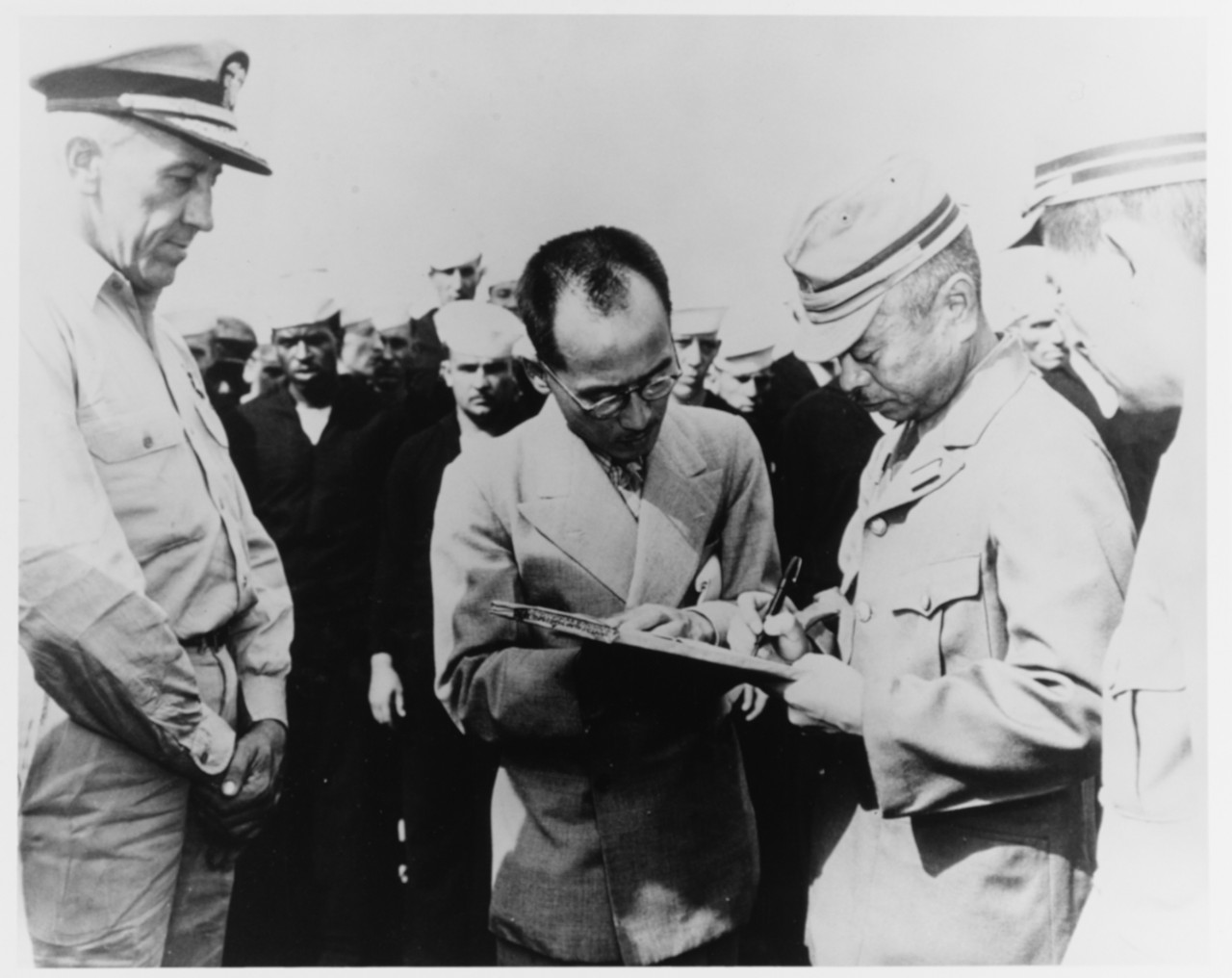
Surrender ceremony of Japanese Vice Admiral Shigeji Kaneko, while Rear admiral Settle on the left looks on.

On March 2, 1944, Settle arrived by airplane at his new command, USS Portland (CA-33), then stationed at Eniwetok. Prior to this appointment, Settle had been in charge of all of U.S. Navy blimps. According to Portland's historian W. T. Generous, the crew—aware of Settle's pre-war fame—recognized him as an "All-Navy" carrier of old school naval tradition and etiquette. Settle "walked with an air of superb self-confidence", making a "terrific impression on the crew", and maintained his reputation until leaving Portland. He notably reduced internal paperwork and external communications, producing very brief dispatches.

After supporting landings in Hollandia, Portland returned to California for dry dock repairs and sailed back to the war zone, via Pearl Harbor, in August, carrying Seabees, infantrymen and reporters (including Joe Rosenthal and John Brennan). In September Portland arrived at Peleliu, supporting landing at Peleliu with gunfire.

On the night of October 24, 1944, Portland took its place in Admiral Jesse B. Oldendorf's order of battle at the northern exit of Surigao Strait, as an inferior Japanese detachment of two battleships and a heavy cruiser approached through the strait from the south. Shortly before 04:00 Portland's gunners opened fire on the approaching Mogami; by 05:40 the battle was over and Oldendorf recalled the pursuing cruisers. Portland became the only heavy cruiser to engage enemy battleships at night twice. In December 1944, Portland provided gunfire support to ground troops in the battle of Mindoro and then sailed to Palau, where Admiral Oldendorf presented Settle with a Navy Cross for his action at Surigao Strait.

On the opening day of the invasion of Lingayen Gulf, January 9, 1945, when Rear Admiral Theodore E. Chandler was killed on January 7, 1945, from extensive lung burns from the kamikaze attack on January 6, 1945, commanding aboard USS Louisville (CA-28), Settle assumed command of Chandler's Cruiser Division Two. Settle's radical shiphandling skills saved Portland from direct kamikaze hits; ship's officers attributed their captain's luck to his former aviator experience. Settle used to break formation under threat from the air, and at least once his maneuvering earned him a reprimand from a commanding admiral; in another episode, it nearly led to the destruction of a landing craft full of troops.

In February 1945 Portland together with USS Minneapolis (CA-36) and HMAS Shropshire supported ground and airborne forces in the recapture of Corregidor and in March sailed to assist capture of Okinawa. On March 21, his first day of the Okinawa campaign, Settle managed to evade eleven torpedo attacks from a submarine but failed in ramming the sub. He left command of Portland in July, one month before the end of the war, when the cruiser was still at Okinawa.

== Post-war career ==
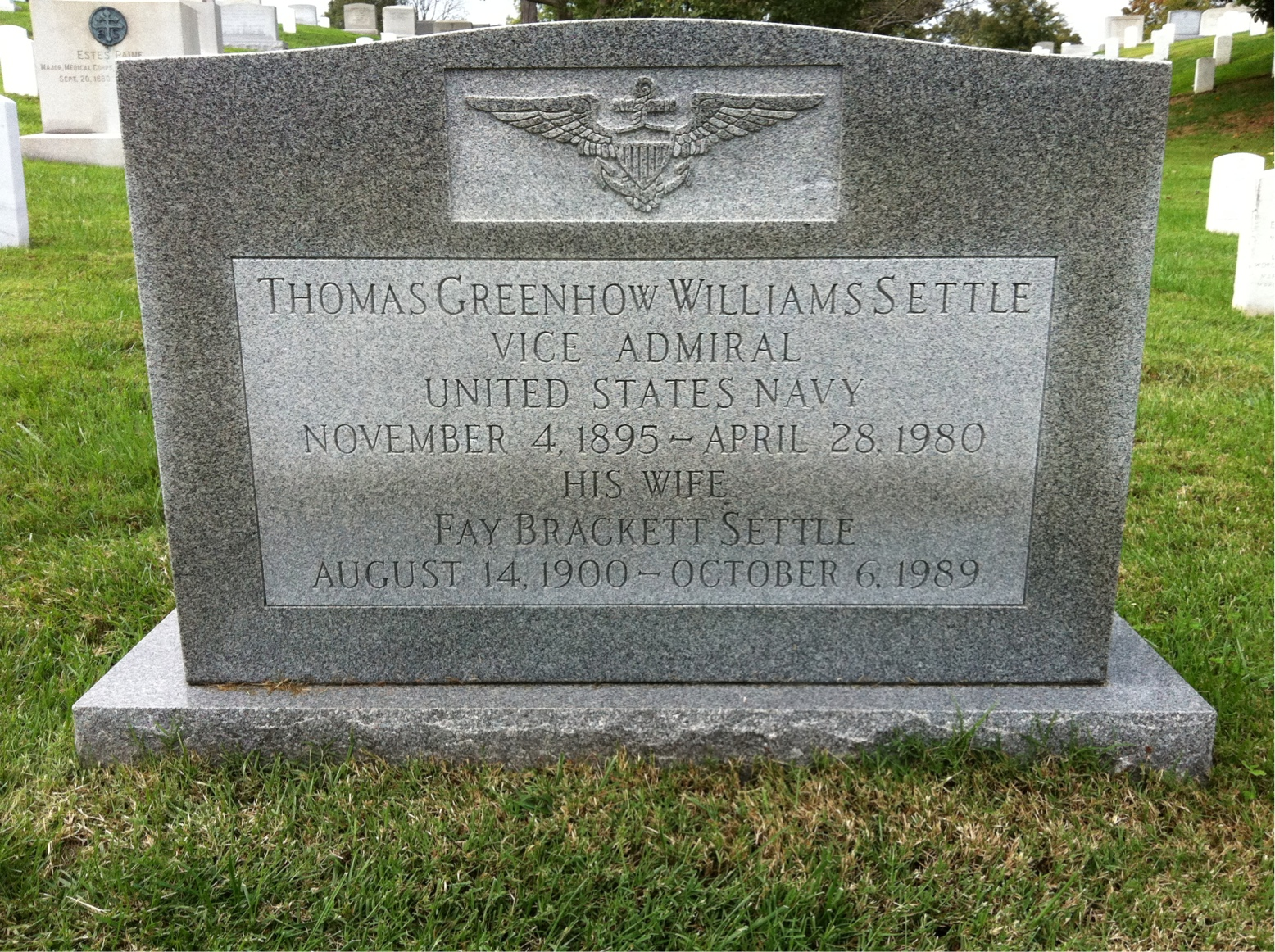
Grave at Arlington National Cemetery

In 1946 Settle returned to China, on the Yangtze River where he replaced Vice Admiral Bertram J. Rodgers as the commander of the Seventh Amphibious Force. Later, Settle moved to Turkey assisting in the implementation of U.S. aid to Greece and Turkey under the Truman Doctrine. He had a long-held ambition to become the ambassador to the Soviet Union that never materialized. After his return to the United States Settle served with the 8th Naval District in New Orleans, Louisiana, with the Pacific Fleet in San Diego, California, and in Norway.

In 1950 Rear Admiral Settle was appointed commander of Joint Task Force 131, responsible for carrying out underground nuclear tests on the Aleutian island Amchitka, codenamed Operation Windstorm. Three 20-kiloton blasts were scheduled for August 30, September 22 and October 2, 1951. In March 1951 news of an upcoming test leaked to the press; Settle proposed a rescheduling of the operation that, in his opinion, would be safer and simpler if performed at established test sites in Nevada and California. As the military and politicians discussed probable alternatives, Settle spoke out in favor of discarding the Aleutian program and disbanding Task Force 131. The project was eventually closed in summer of 1951.

Settle later served with the temporary rank of Vice admiral as Commander, Amphibious Force, Pacific Fleet from 1954 to 1956 and then reverted to Rear admiral and retired one year later.

== Awards ==

Naval Aviator Badge
1st Row	Navy Cross		Legion of Merit with Combat "V"
2nd Row	Bronze Star Medal with Combat "V"	World War I Victory Medal with Fleet Clasp	China Service Medal with service star
3rd Row	American Defense Service Medal with "A" Device	American Campaign Medal	European-African-Middle Eastern Campaign Medal
4th Row	Asiatic–Pacific Campaign Medal with one silver and two bronze 3/16 inch service stars	World War II Victory Medal	Navy Occupation Service Medal
5th Row	National Defense Service Medal	Philippine Liberation Medal with two stars	Order of the Cloud and Banner, 4th Class with Special Cravat (Republic of China)

== Books by Settle ==
- The Last Cruise of Palos (1964), in: Howell, Glenn (2002). Gunboat on the Yangtze: the diary of Captain Glenn F. Howell of the USS Palos, 1920-1921. McFarland. ISBN 0786412321., originally published in Shipmates, vol. 24 no. 4, April 1964

== Notes and references ==
Preceded by USSR-1	Human altitude record 1933-1934; With: Chester L. Fordney	Succeeded by Osoaviakhim-1
