= Osoaviakhim-1 =

1934 Soviet manned high-altitude balloon

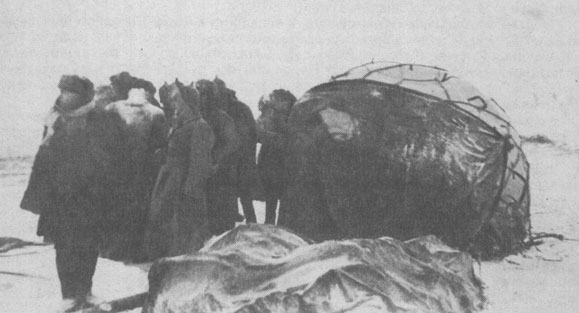
- Crash site

Accident
- Date: January 30, 1934
- Summary: Catastrophic loss of buoyancy
- Site: Insarsky District of Mordovia (470 km east from Moscow); 53°52′N 44°22′E

Aircraft
- Aircraft type: Experimental high-altitude balloon
- Aircraft name: Osoaviakhim-1
- Operator: Osoaviakhim
- Crew: 3
- Survivors: 0

Osoaviakhim-1 was a record-setting, hydrogen-filled Soviet high-altitude balloon designed to seat a crew of three and perform scientific studies of the Earth's stratosphere. On January 30, 1934, on its maiden flight, which lasted over 7 hours, the balloon reached an altitude of 22,000 metres (72,000 ft). During the descent, the balloon lost its buoyancy and plunged into an uncontrolled fall, disintegrating in the lower atmosphere. The three crew members, probably incapacitated by high g-forces in a rapidly rotating gondola, failed to bail out and were killed by the high-speed ground impact.

According to public investigation reports, the crash was ultimately caused by a prolonged stay at record altitudes exceeding maximum design limits. The balloon, overheated by sunlight, lost too much lifting gas in the upper atmosphere. As it descended past the 12,000 metres (39,000 ft) mark, cooling down to ambient air temperature, a rapid loss of buoyancy caused a downward acceleration that triggered the structural failure of the suspension cables. The aircraft design was marked by numerous engineering flaws, notably insufficient ballast and faulty gondola suspension design, which all contributed to the loss of life.

Later Soviet manned high-altitude balloons improved on safety devices and did not venture above 16,000 metres (52,000 ft); the program was nevertheless marked with accidents and failures and was terminated after the Osoaviakhim-2 launch failure in June 1940.

== Background ==
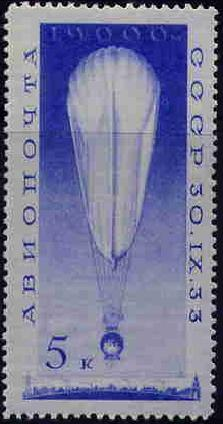
USSR-1 on a 1933 postage stamp. Here the balloon is shown in low altitude configuration; in the stratosphere the envelope expanded into a nearly perfect sphere.

Auguste Piccard's high-altitude flights of 1930–1932 aroused interest of Soviet Air Forces and Osoaviakhim, the Soviet paramilitary training organization, as well as individual pilots, designers and flight enthusiasts. Andrey Vasenko, an engineer from the Institute of Aerial Photography in Leningrad, and a future crewmember of Osoaviakhim-1, designed his version of Piccard's balloon in 1930, however, Osoaviakhim delayed funding until the end of 1932.

The second competing proposal, that of the national Meteorology Committee, emerged in January 1932 and was soon abandoned, also for the lack of finance. This allowed the third competitor, the Air Forces, a solid lead in time. USSR-1, the Air Forces stratospheric balloon, was designed by Georgy Prokofiev with assistance of Vladimir Chizhevsky, Konstantin Godunov and the Air Force Academy staff. Their balloon, built in Moscow by professional aircraft technicians, proved to be far safer than Vasenko's. It had two airtight hatches with fast-opening locks; ballast was carried externally and could be instantly released on demand. The gondola was reinforced with an internal and an external frame that prevented direct contact between the airtight compartment's skin and suspension cables. Osoaviakhim-1 lacked all these safety features.

Both the Osoaviakhim and the Air Forces program were primarily scientific, with expected practical applications in meteorology and future high-altitude airplanes. The Osoaviakhim program, in particular, was sponsored and consulted by Abram Ioffe of the Physical-Technical Institute; one of his postgraduate students, Ilya Usyskin, joined the crew of Osoaviakhim-1 and perished on its fatal flight.

== Design flaws ==
The 24,940 cubic metre Osoaviakhim-1 was completed by Vasenko and Evgeniy Chertovsky in Leningrad in June 1933. With 2,460 kilograms gross weight at launch and 2,600 kilograms initial lifting force, it was expected to fully expand at 17,700 metres and reach static equilibrium at 19,500. Maximum altitude was initially set at 20,000 metres but the upgrades made during construction, according to Vasenko, enabled it to reach even higher.

In August the balloon was commissioned to fly despite known technical flaws. The commissioners emphasized that the crew, although equipped with personal parachutes, had little chance of bailing out in case of emergency: the sole airtight hatch was held in place with twelve wing nuts. Opening it, even on solid ground, required minutes. The crew did not wear pressure suits (which simply did not exist at that time) or individual breathing sets, relying on stored supplies of compressed oxygen and carbon dioxide absorber cartridges. Crew survival depended on the gondola's integrity; bailing out without breathing sets was feasible only at altitudes below 8,000 metres.

The gondola itself was welded from 0.8 millimetre sheet metal without any structural frame. In addition to the crew, instruments and life support systems, it carried a tonne of lead ballast inside the airtight sphere. The ballast release chute was sufficiently airtight but provided a very slow discharge rate: releasing a ton of ballast normally took a whole hour. In real flight this flaw alone would prevent the crew from slowing down the falling balloon despite having ballast on board.

Finally, the designers did not take care to unlink the delicate gondola structure from the tension of the suspending cables. Unlike Piccard's design with 32 cables, Osoaviakhim-1 had only nine (eight peripheral and one central cable). These cables were woven into a kind of basket holding the gondola. It could easily rotate inside the basket; any tension from the cables was immediately passed onto its thin shell.

== Crew ==
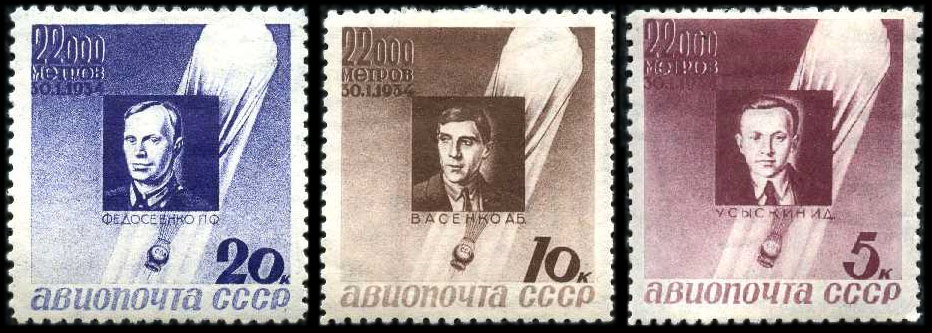
Fedoseenko, Vasenko, Usyskin on 1934 postage stamps. A similar set in different colors was issued in 1944.

Osoaviakhim-1 had a crew of three men:

- Aircraft commander Pavel Fedoseenko (born 1898), a graduate of the Air Force School in Leningrad and Zhukovsky Air Force Academy in Moscow, was a career military aviator who logged over a hundred flights (377 hours) on tethered observation balloons in World War I and the Russian Civil War and later tested numerous free-flying balloons and airships. In 1925 Fedoseenko and Alexander Friedmann set a national altitude record of 7,400 m (24,300 ft). In 1927 Fedoseenko set a national solo endurance record of 23 h 57 m. His influence in the Leningrad branch of Osoaviakhim helped establish a balloon-making workshop at Leningrad's Stalin Plant, although they failed to beat their air force competitors.
- Flight engineer Andrey Vasenko (born 1899), a native of Tsarskoye Selo, also fought on the Bolshevik side in the Civil War; in 1927 he graduated from the fledgling department of aircraft of the Leningrad Institute of Railroad Engineers, while working full-time as a school teacher in his hometown. In 1929 Vasenko joined the staff of an observatory in Pavlovsk (later Aerological Institute) headed by Pavel Molchanov; two years later, after a string of successful meteoroligal studies, he was promoted to deputy director of the institute. Apart from Osoaviakhim-1, Vasenko designed a series of captive balloons for photographic surveys of large construction sites.
- Instrument operator Ilya Usyskin (born 1910), son of a Jewish blacksmith from Vitebsk, studied at Moscow Technical University and Abram Ioffe's Physical-Technical Institute in Leningrad. At the age of 20 he published his first peer-reviewed articles on biophysical experiments suggested by Ioffe, although he himself leaned towards nuclear physics. In 1932–1933 Usyskin designed portable, lightweight scientific instruments for stratospheric balloons, and was a natural choice for the Osoaviakhim-1 crew. At first Fedoseenko disliked Usyskin's personality but later changed his mind, assuring Ioffe of his full trust in Usyskin. According to the Mezheninov commission report, Usyskin considered his role in the January flight unnecessary, because it turned out that his portable cloud chambers were unsuitable for high-altitude experiments in winter and had to be replaced with less sophisticated instruments.

== Cancelled flight ==
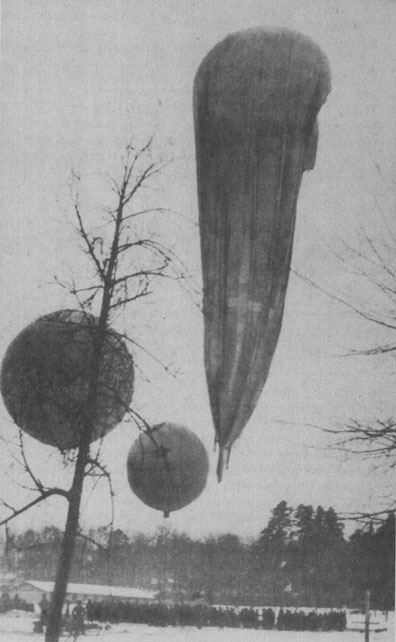
Launch preparations

Maiden flight of Osoaviakhim-1 and USSR-1 was planned on September 30, 1933, from the same Air Forces airfield in Kuntsevo (earlier, USSR-1 failed to lift off due to a "heavy load of moisture"). The military, as the hosts of the site, were the first to fly. USSR-1 with Prokofiev, Godunov and Ernst Birnbaum on board lifted off at 8:40 Moscow Time, reached an altitude of 18,800 metres (61,700 ft) at 14:45 and landed safely around 17:00. Their altitude record, although not recognized by FAI, was publicized worldwide. Flight of Osoaviakhim-1, scheduled to take off later than USSR-1, was cancelled due to unexpected strong winds.

Launches in later autumn and winter was deemed impractical and dangerous, and the balloons were disassembled for winter storage. Fedoseenko, expecting that delicate fabrics and gondola would not survive it, proposed a winter launch, and received a go-ahead for it. They missed the first launch window in the end of December; the next streak of good weather was expected in the end of January, coincident with the 17th Congress of the Communist Party, and thus attracting the focus of communist propaganda.

January 9, 1934 Defence Commissar Kliment Voroshilov requested Stalin's approval of the winter launch, specifically noting that it would be kept secret until the altitude record was set. On January 11 Politburo approved the launch; secrecy concerns were discarded and the flight was publicized in advance.

On January 23 the envelope was partially inflated and properly tested for leaks at a rubber factory in Khamovniki. Gondola and ballast release hardware were also rigorously tested and declared to be in order. On January 28 Osoaviakhim-1 and its crew arrived at the Air Forces field in Kuntsevo. The next day was filled with publicity interviews, meetings and committees extending beyond midnight.

== Fatal flight ==
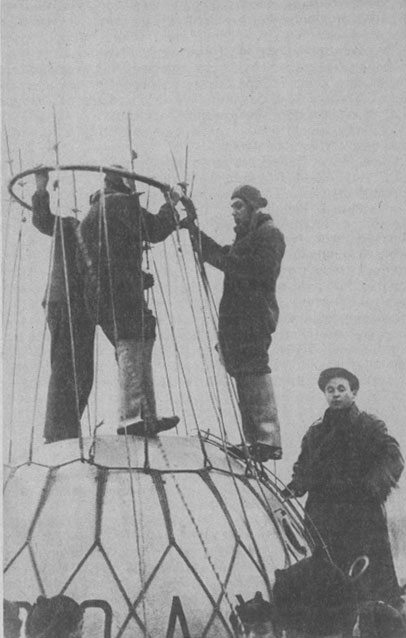
Osoaviakhim-1 crew boarding the fatal flight. Note the rope basket woven around the gondola.

Weighing on the morning of the launch day, January 30, demonstrated that the aircraft still possessed a reserve in buoyancy, and the crew decided to increase ballast weight by 180 kilograms, which would enable them to reach 20,500 metres altitude, higher than initial estimates. Prior to the launch of Osoaviakhim-1 meteorologists released radiosondes that reported satisfactory weather on the ascent path.

At 9:07 Moscow Time Osoaviakhim-1 lifted off and soon made radio contact with the airfield. By 9:56 the aircraft reached 15,000 metres according to on-board altimeter; at around 17,700 metres its envelope expanded into a nearly perfect sphere and eventually reached static equilibrium at 19,500 metres, exactly as intended by design. The crew experienced problems with carbon dioxide absorbers, but it appeared to be manageable. Fedoseenko dumped 310 kilograms of ballast and by 10:50 the balloon passed its design altitude of 20,500 metres. This moment was later marked as the point of no return: at 20,500 metres Osoaviakhim-1 carried just enough ballast to stabilize descent speed. Further ascent and inevitable loss of hydrogen made this ballast insufficient; the only escape route was through bailing out on personal parachutes, provided that the crew could open the awkward hatch. After nearly an hour at 20,600 metres Osoaviakhim-1 climbed again, reaching 22,000 metres at 12:33 and hovered at this record altitude for 12 minutes.

At 12:45 the crew opened the gas release valve for three minutes to initiate descent; the hot balloon did not respond as planned and travel to 18,000 metres took more than two hours. At this altitude vertical descent speed levelled at a safe and steady one metre per second. At around 14,000 metres vertical speed increased, reaching two meters per second at 13,400 meters. The lifting force of the remaining hydrogen had been reduced to 1300–1400 kilograms, while the balloon weighed an estimated 2,120 kilograms.

Between 16:05 and 16:10, when Osoaviakhim-1 descended to 12,000 metres, vertical acceleration went out of control; the balloon began disintegrating before it reached 8,000 metres. At about 2,000 meters the gondola separated from the balloon and impacted the ground between 16:21 and 16:23, near Potizh-Ostrov village in rural Insarsky District of Mordovia, 470 kilometres east from the launch site.

According to Yagoda's report to Stalin, OGPU officers confirmed the crash and reported its exact location at 23:40. The bodies in the gondola were badly maimed; Fedoseenko's skull had disintegrated, probably after impacting a tempered glass porthole. The balloon envelope fell 4 kilometres from the gondola and its fabric was quickly looted by local villagers.

== Aftermath ==
=== Publicity and propaganda ===
23 hours after the impact, Avel Enukidze announced the accident from the rostrum of the Communist Party congress; immediately after his brief statement Pavel Postyshev proposed burying the crew in Kremlin Wall Necropolis. Soviet morning papers reported the news on February 1. Western press followed suit; Time magazine, although incorrectly reporting that "there was not enough left of the crushed gondola or the three broken bodies to supply the story of the tragedy", correctly guessed the roots of the catastrophe: "winter weather had contracted the balloon's gas to such a point that it fell like a dead weight".

The funeral of the crew (February 2) turned a disaster into a propaganda campaign; the three victims were posthumously awarded the Order of Lenin and their ashes buried with state honours in the Kremlin Wall Necropolis. Stalin, Voroshilov and Molotov personally carried the urns of Fedoseenko, Usyskin and Vasenko. This was the last group funeral on Red Square until the 1971 Soyuz 11 disaster, which also claimed three lives.

Potizh-Ostrov, the village near the crash site, was renamed to Usyskino; across the country, streets and squares were named after individual crewmembers or collectively, like Proezd Stratonavtov in Tushino (now a district of Moscow). Postage stamps in memory of Fedoseenko, Vasenko and Usyskin were issued in 1934 (Scott C50, C51, C52), 1944 (Scott C77, C78, C79) and 1964 (Scott 2888).

=== Investigation ===
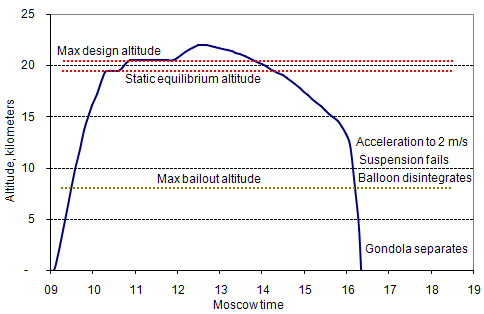
Osoaviakhim-1 flight profile according to Mezheninov's report

Investigators headed by Prokofiev arrived on site on horseback 24 hours after the crash and issued their first statement on February 1. They acknowledged that the crew died of high speed impact at 16:21 Moscow time; the flight logs, found intact, revealed that the crewmembers were unaware of imminent catastrophe until 16:10, when the balloon descended to 12,000 meters. This moment was marked as the beginning of an irrecoverable dive. Airspeed beyond design limits snapped the suspension cables and tore open the envelope; eventually the gondola completely separated from the falling balloon. There was no evidence of icing despite early reports in Pravda. Autopsy ruled out suffocation or poisoning of the crew; barograph tape indicated normal internal air pressure throughout the flight.

On February 5, a state commission chaired by General Staff deputy chief Mezheninov issued a detailed report that, regardless of later findings and clarifications, provided a stable version of the accident and its causes; the time of impact was changed to 16:23. Later, in 1935, these proceedings were explained at length in a book by one of the commissioners, meteorologist Pavel Molchanov. According to Mezheninov's report and Molchanov's book, during the four-hour-long stratospheric flight the hydrogen inside the balloon was overheated by solar radiation (54 °C above ambient) and expanded beyond the balloon's geometric capacity; excess gas leaked out through safety valves. More gas was lost when Fedoseenko initiated the descent. As the balloon cooled down on its descent, the remaining gas contracted with a catastrophic loss of buoyancy. To stabilize airspeed at safe level the crew would have had to dump 800 kilograms of ballast, but there simply was not that much ballast left. Suspension cables failures started at altitudes above 8,000 meters, where the crew was unable to open the hatch. The commission summarized the causes of the crash by writing:

1. The accident was caused by an increase in vertical descent speed that resulted from changes in lifting gas volume during the extended stay at maximum altitude and subsequent descent into warmer atmospheric medium which further reduced lift.
2. The system failed to withstand shock stress caused by rapid descent and transition into parachuting mode, and began disintegrating.
3. The crew failed to release ballast and dump instruments due to the design flaw that prevented rapid release of ballast.
4. The crew's failure to stabilize vertical speed led to their failure to bail out on parachutes due to erratic tumbling of the gondola.
5. Airtightness and life support systems were in order until the moment of catastrophic fall, as indicated by barometric recorder and Vasenko's log entries ending at 16:13.
6. During the last 9.5 minutes of the fall the crew tumbled inside the rotating gondola, but all crew members remained vertical until the end; their deaths were caused by the final impact.

Conclusion: The flight was substantially safe up to 19,500 meters; 20,500 meters was on the edge but presented no imminent danger; ascent to 22,000 meters led to an inevitable accident.

In March the investigators' reports were released to the general public, including the final verdict blaming the catastrophe on the crew's "recklessness in rise for record".

=== Safety improvements ===
The commissioners strongly recommended safety improvements, starting with easy access to emergency hatches. Balloons of the late 1930s were equipped with large parachutes capable of safely carrying the detached gondolas; another proposal, integrating airtight gondolas into detachable gliders, was tested and discarded. VR60 Komsomol (1939) had another safety feature: in case of abnormally rapid descent its balloon was designed to flatten into a gigantic parachute canopy.

The crash also provided motivation to develop pressure suits for high-altitude flight; the first operational suits were designed by Evgeniy Chertovsky, co-designer of Osoaviakhim-1.

=== Takeover by the military ===
Voroshilov summarized his understanding of the investigators' reports in a February 19 note to Stalin: "... despite lack of proper management during construction and pre-flight preparation, the flight itself was technically feasible up to 20,500 meter altitude. The accident was caused by the crew's, specifically Fedoseenko's, drive to beat the 'world superrecord' regardless of technical limits and flight conditions".

Mezheninov's report blamed the failure on inadequate, erratic, amateur project management by Osoaviakhim chiefs and recommended consolidation of all stratospheric projects within the Air Forces. Voroshilov concurred and requested the same from Stalin. Specifically, all independent design work was to be transferred to the Air Forces Institute, crew training to the Air Forces Academy. By the end of 1934 the takeover was complete, and Voroshilov assumed responsibility for any future balloon failures.

Contrary to Western authors stating that Osoaviakhim-1 crash led to grounding of manned Soviet stratospheric flight and a launch of an unmanned probe program that continued for several decades, a manned program led by Georgy Prokofiev continued but was plagued by failures and accidents:

- September 5, 1934, the gigantic (300,000 cubic meters) USSR-2 burnt down at the launch site when a static spark ignited hydrogen. After this incident Voroshilov indeed banned all further stratospheric flights until the engineers sorted out safety procedures. Voroshilov made it clear that research results were more important than record stunts; the numerous successful flights of 1935–1940 were limited to 16,000 meters and never made history.
- June 26, 1935, USSR-1 Bis reached 16,000 meters (52,000 ft) and nearly ended in disaster when its envelope ripped open, releasing gas. Two of the crew members bailed out at 3,500 and 2,500 meters, but the third managed to land the crippled balloon safely. USSR-1 Bis (essentially a reused USSR-1) was equipped with a large (34 meter diameter) rescue parachute, sufficient to carry the gondola at safe speeds. The pilot deliberately did not use it, fearing that releasing the parachute would damage externally mounted scientific instruments.
- The supersized (157,000 cubic meters, 130 meter tall) USSR-3 was launched on September 18, 1937; at 700–800 meters altitude it began losing hydrogen and fell back near the launch site. Crew members, including Prokofiev, survived with injuries. After the many setbacks that followed, USSR-3 flew again March 16, 1939; it lifted off, again under Prokofiev's command, and again fell, this time from 1,200 meters. Prokofiev blamed the crash on an accidental release by a hydrogen valve and committed suicide one month later.
- July 18, 1938, the failure of breathing equipment killed the four-man crew of VVA-1. The balloon floated from Zvenigorod to Donetsk where it crashed into a high-voltage power line, exploding on impact.
- October 12, 1939 a static discharge at 9,000 meters ignited hydrogen in SP-2 Komsomol (VR60). The crew unlatched the gondola, which went into free fall, deployed the gondola parachute, and then bailed out on personal parachutes; all survived. This failure led to a switch from hydrogen to helium.
- Osoaviakhim-2, the last Soviet manned stratostat, was launched June 22, 1940. Immediately after launch, the gondola separated from the balloon and fell about 11 meters onto the airfield; the crew survived with minor injuries. After this failure, Commissar of Defence Semyon Timoshenko shut down the military stratospheric program.

== See also ==
- Flight altitude record

== Sources ==
- Abramov, Isaac (2003). Russian spacesuits. Springer. ISBN 978-1-85233-732-2.
- Brontman, Lazar (1939). "Diaries, 1939–1940 (in Russian)".
- Druzhinin, Yu. A. (2006). "Polyoty v stratosfery v SSSR v 1930-e g. (Полёты в стратосферу в СССР в 1930-е г.)" [Flights to the stratosphere in the USSR in the 1930s]. Voprosy istorii estestvoznania i tehniki (in Russian) (4). Archived from the original on 2010-12-06.
- Golovanov, Yaroslav (1994). Korolyov (Королёв) (in Russian). Moscow:Nauka. ISBN 5-02-000822-2.
- Istochnik journal staff (1997). "Dokumenty o katastrophe stratostata Osoaviakhim-1 (Документы о катастрофе стратостата Осоавиахим-1)" [Documents about the catastrophe of the stratospheric balloon Osoaviakhim-1]. Istochnik (in Russian) (2).
- Leskov, Sergey (2004). "Gibel vozdushnogo Titanika (Гибель воздушного Титаника)" [The death of the air Titanic] (in Russian). Novye Izvestia.
- Maxwell, Alexander (January 1936). "Sky high, why not?". Popular Mechanics: 26–27, 136A.
- Medovoy, Lev (2000). "Svet dalekoy zvezdy (Свет далёкой звезды)" [Light from a distant star] (in Russian). Lechaim, January 2000 No. 93.
- Moshchenikova, M. A. (1999). "A. B. Vasenko (А. Б. Васенко)" (in Russian). Museum of Pushkin.
- Muromov, Igor (2003). 100 velikih aviakatastrof (100 великих авиакатастроф) [100 Great Plane Crashes] (in Russian). Veche. ISBN 978-5-9533-0029-2.
- Poluboyarinova-Kochina, P. Ya. (January–February 1964). "Aleksandr Fridman" (PDF). Soviet Physics Uspekhi (English Edition): 467–472.
- Shayler, David (2000). Disasters and accidents in manned spaceflight. Springer. pp. 20–22. ISBN 978-1-85233-225-9.
- Shayler, David (2001). The rocket men: Vostok & Voskhod, the first Soviet manned spaceflights. Springer. ISBN 978-1-85233-391-1.
- Vaeth, Joseph Gordon (2005). They sailed the skies: U.S. Navy balloons and the airship program. Naval Institute Press. ISBN 978-1-59114-914-9.

Preceded by Thomas G. W. Settle and Chester L. Fordney	Human altitude record 1934-1935	Succeeded by Explorer II
