= Martinje =

Martinje Magasfok
- Location in Slovenia
- Coordinates: 46°49′47.33″N 16°12′51.23″E
- Country: Slovenia
- Traditional region: Prekmurje
- Statistical region: Mura
- Municipality: Gornji Petrovci

Area
  - Total: 2.66 km^{2} (1.03 sq mi)
- Elevation: 283.9 m (931 ft)

Population (2020)
  - Total: 111
  - Density: 41.7/km^{2} (108/sq mi)

Martinje (pronounced [maɾˈtiːnjɛ]; Hungarian: Magasfok) is a village in the Municipality of Gornji Petrovci in the Prekmurje region of Slovenia, right on the border with Hungary.

== Notable people ==
Notable people that were born or lived in Martinje include:

- Lojze Kozar Sr. (1910–1999), priest, writer, and translator
- Lojze Kozar Jr. (born 1958), priest, poet, and writer
