= Yevgeny Chertovsky =

Engineer

Yevgeny Yefimovich Chertovsky (Russian: Евгений Ефимович Чертовский; February 15, 1902 – 1961) was a Soviet Russian inventor who designed the first full pressure suit in Leningrad in 1931.

Chertovsky, an engineer at the Aviation Medicine Institute, was involved in the early Soviet stratospheric balloon program, and co-designed the ill-fated Osoaviakhim-1. The first aircraft designed for crew wearing Chertovsky's pressure suits could have been a gigantic (300,000 cubic meters) USSR-3 balloon that burnt down on launch pad in September 1935.

The CH-1 was a simple pressure-tight suit with helmet which did not have joints, thus requiring substantial force to move the arms and legs when pressurised. This was remedied in CH-2 (1932–1935) and later suits, up to the 1940 CH-7. CH-3 was the first operational suit that allowed the pilot sufficient freedom of movement, first tested in flight in 1937 at a 12-kilometer altitude.

Chertovsky coined the term "skafander" for full pressure suits; from the Greek words skaf ("boat", "ship") and andros ("man"); skafandr has since become the term used by Russians to refer to standard diving dresses or space suits.
