= Max Cosyns =

Belgian physicist, caver, and explorer

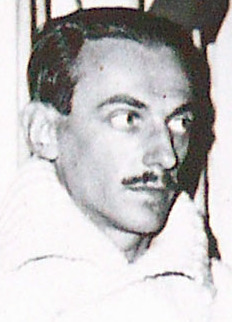
- 1935
- Born: 29 May 1906; Belgium
- Died: 30 March 1998 (aged 91)
- Scientific career
- Fields: physics, inventor, explorer
- Workplaces: Free University of Brussels (now Université libre de Bruxelles and Vrije Universiteit Brussel)

Max Cosyns (29 May 1906 – 30 March 1998) was a Belgian physicist, inventor, explorer and speleologist.

== Early life and education ==
Max Cosyns was Auguste Piccard's assistant at the Université libre de Bruxelles and on 18 August 1932 participated in the record-breaking ascent into the stratosphere to 16,200 m (53,152 ft), launched from Dübendorf, Switzerland. For this he was awarded the Cross of Knight of the Order of Leopold by the Belgian King in 1932.

== Career ==
On 18 August 1934, Cosyns together with his student Nérée van der Elst piloted a balloon to an altitude of 52,952 feet. Following a take-off from Hour-Havenne in Belgium, they flew over Germany and Austria before landing near the village of Ženavlje (now in Slovenia). They were unsuccessful in maintaining satisfactory radio communication with ground, but were able to make observations of the currents in the stratosphere as well as investigate the nature of the cosmic rays. They failed to beat the height record, but stated on landing that they were fully satisfied with their discoveries. A large bronze monument in the shape of a balloon was erected in 1997 on the spot of their landing in Ženavlje to commemorate the event.

== Second World War resistance ==
In the Second World War, he joined the Resistance and was imprisoned in Dachau concentration camp.

After the war he was co-director of the FNRS-2 bathyscaphe expedition in Dakar in 1948.

In 1952, he was in charge of the speleological expedition to the Gouffre de La Pierre Saint-Martin cave system in the Pyrenees. The French speleologist Marcel Loubens, after spending four days in the cave, died in an accident with an electric hoist during the ascent when the steel cable snapped. Cosyns as head of the expedition and due to his involvement in the design of the winch was considered responsible for the accident.

== Personal life ==
Cosyns married fellow Belgian resistance member and lawyer Andrée Grandjean.

== Notes ==
Preceded by Auguste Piccard and Paul Kipfer	Human altitude record 1932–1933; With: Auguste Piccard	Succeeded by USSR-1
