= Gornji Petrovci =

Gornji Petrovci Péterhegy
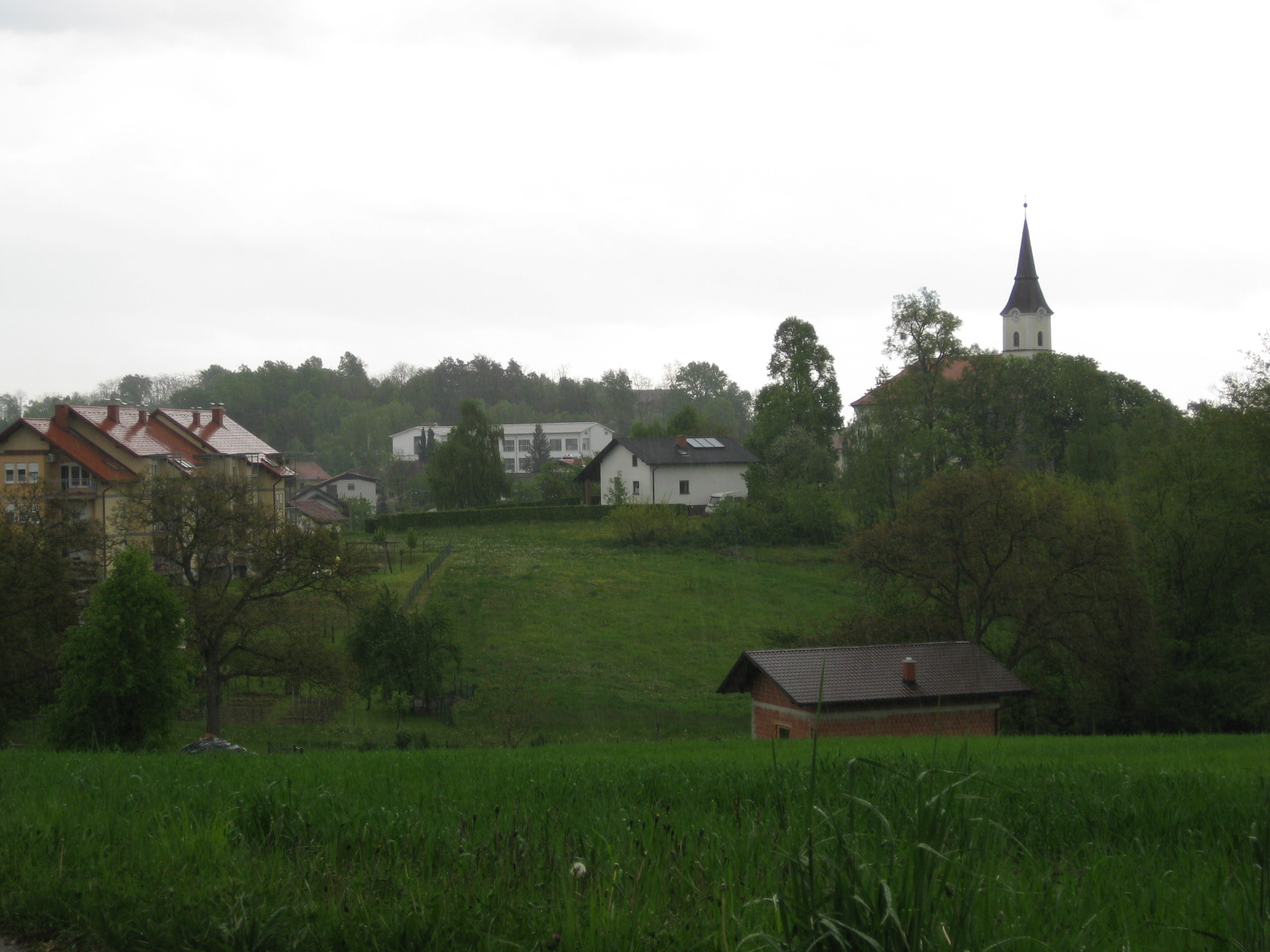

- Location in Slovenia
- Coordinates: 46°48′17.83″N 16°13′1.95″E
- Country: Slovenia
- Traditional region: Prekmurje
- Statistical region: Mura
- Municipality: Gornji Petrovci

Area
  - Total: 5.3 km^{2} (2.0 sq mi)
- Elevation: 282.8 m (928 ft)

Population (2020)
  - Total: 411
  - Density: 78/km^{2} (200/sq mi)

Gornji Petrovci (pronounced [ˈɡoːɾnji pɛˈtɾoːu̯tsi]; Hungarian: Péterhegy, Prekmurje Slovene: Gornji Petrouvci) is a town in Slovenia. It is the seat of the Municipality of Gornji Petrovci.

== Churches ==
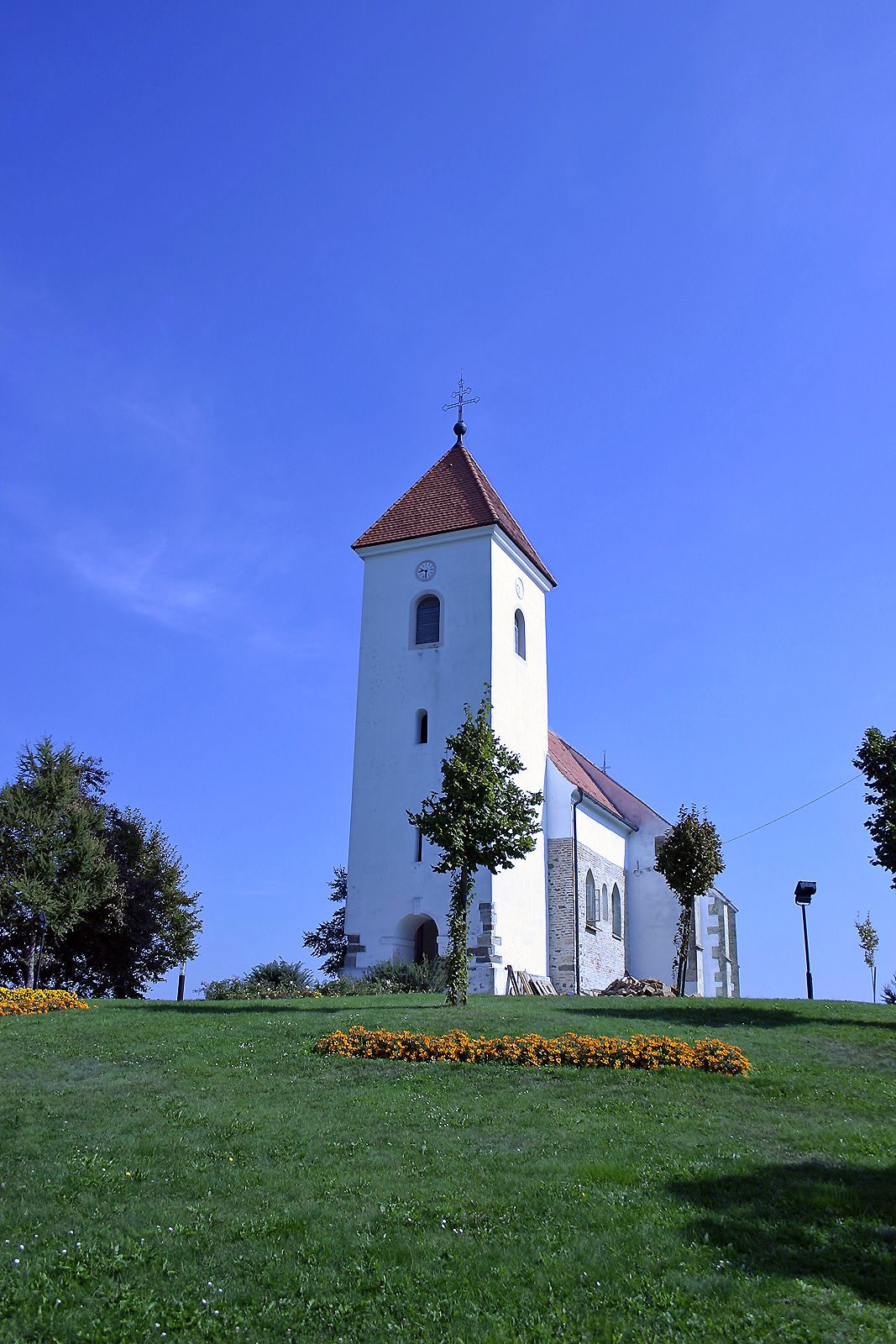
Holy Trinity Church

There are two churches in Gornji Petrovci. The Roman Catholic parish church is dedicated to the Holy Trinity and is a structure that originated in the late 13th century, but was rebuilt on a number of occasions in the following centuries, preserving certain features from each phase. The relatively short nave is Romanesque, with Baroque internal furnishings. The sanctuary is Late Gothic. The local Lutheran church is a large single-nave building and is one of the largest Lutheran churches in Prekmurje. It was built in 1804 and renovated in 1894.

== Notable people ==
Notable people that were born or lived in Gornji Petrovci include:

- Mátyás Godina (1768–1835), Lutheran pastor and writer
- János Hüll (1714–1781), dean of the Slovene March
- Sándor Mikola (1871–1945), physics teacher and irredentist
