= Luxor =

City in southern Egypt

Luxor الأقصر
- City
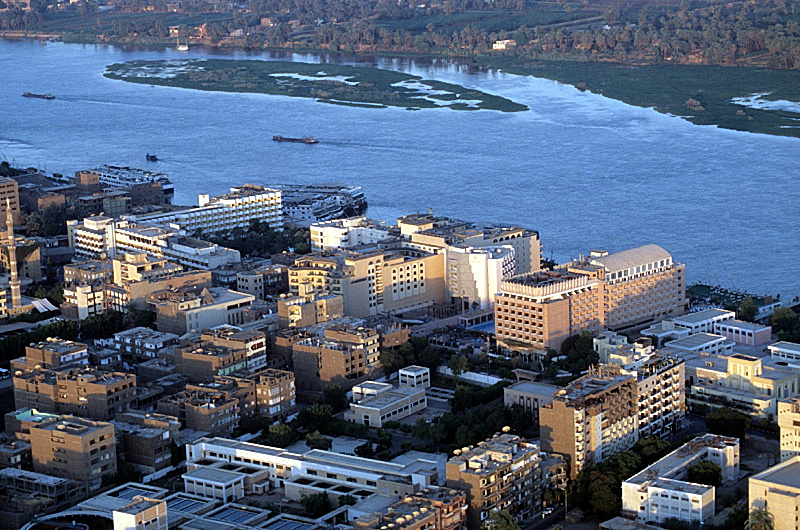
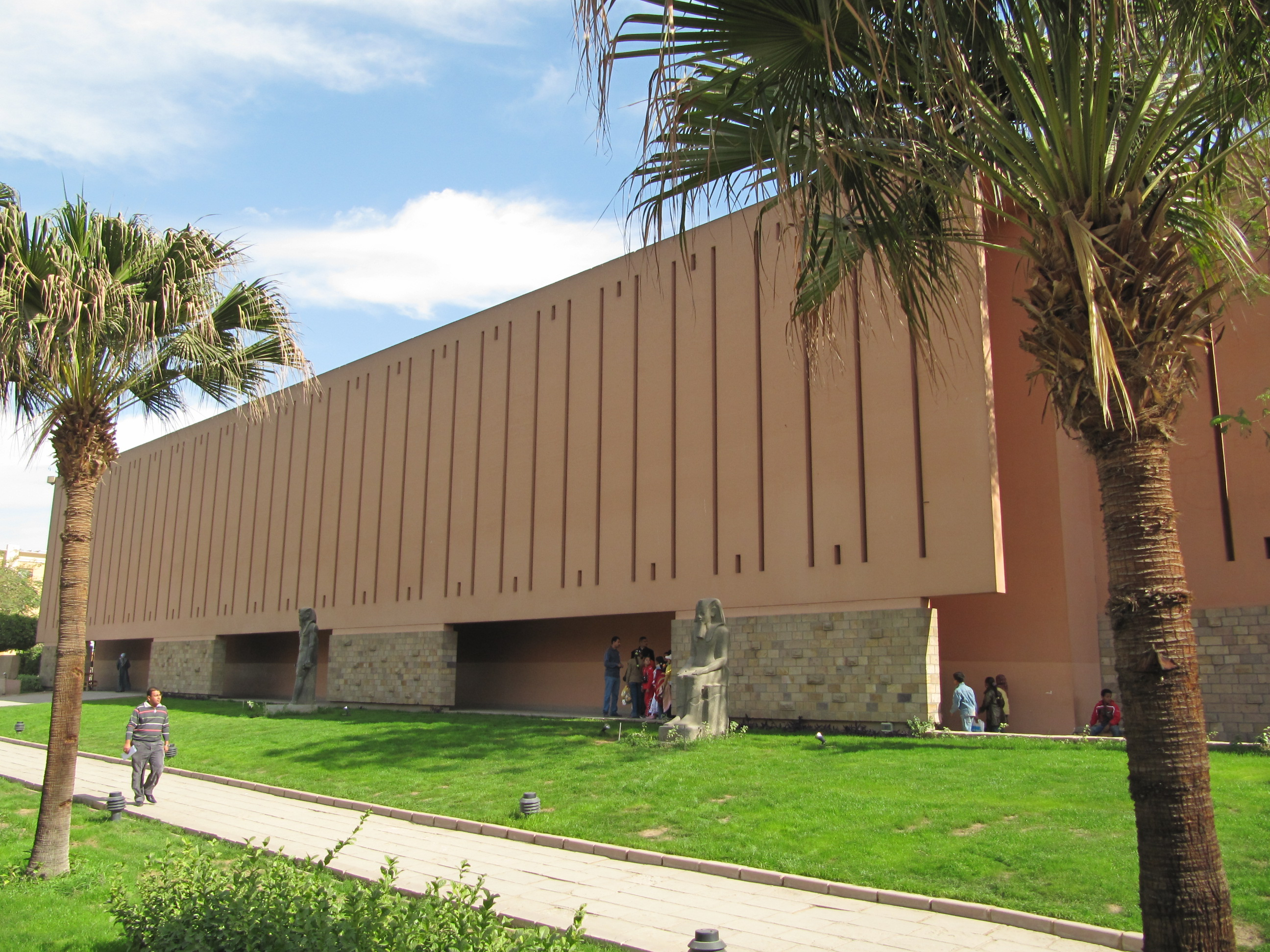
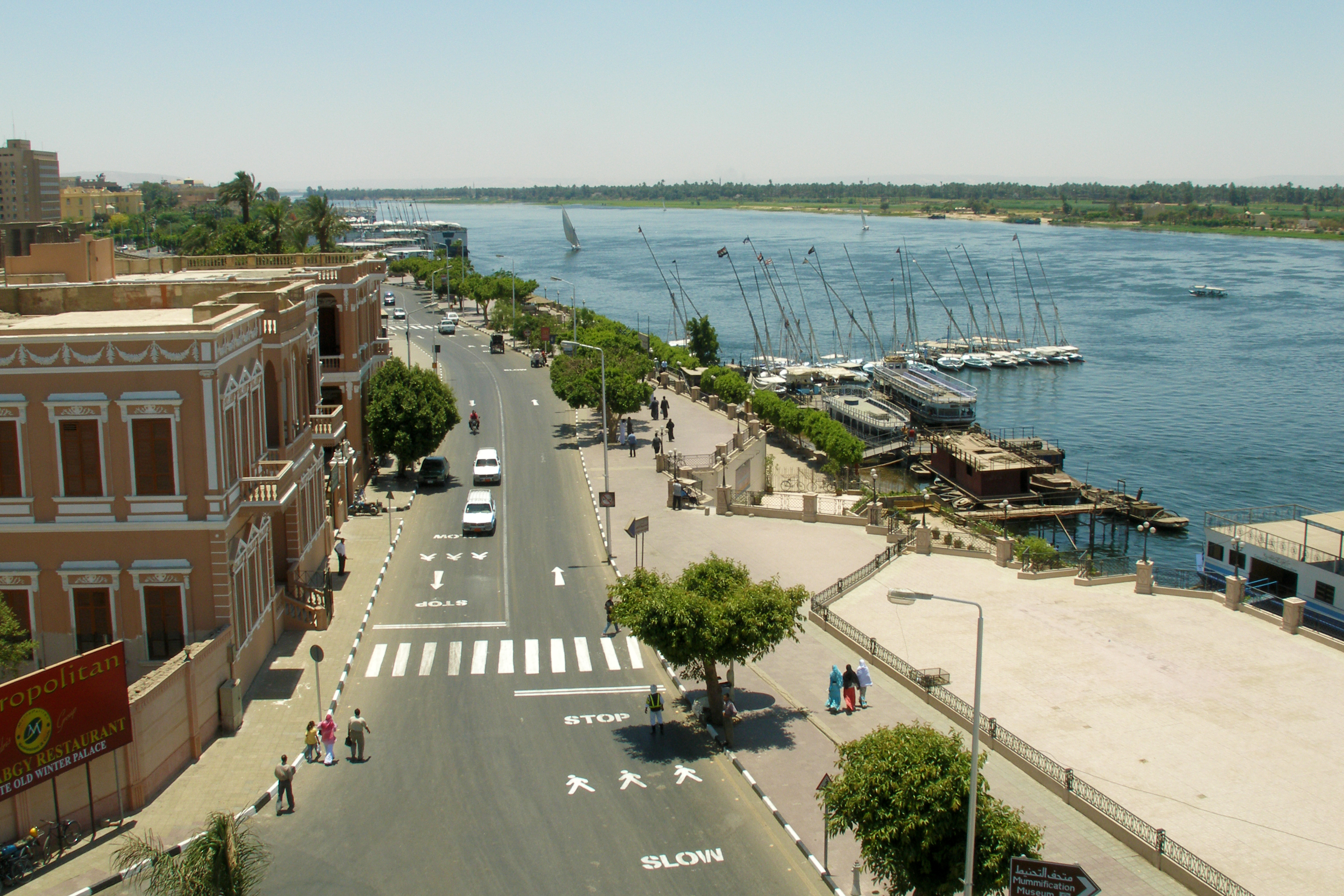
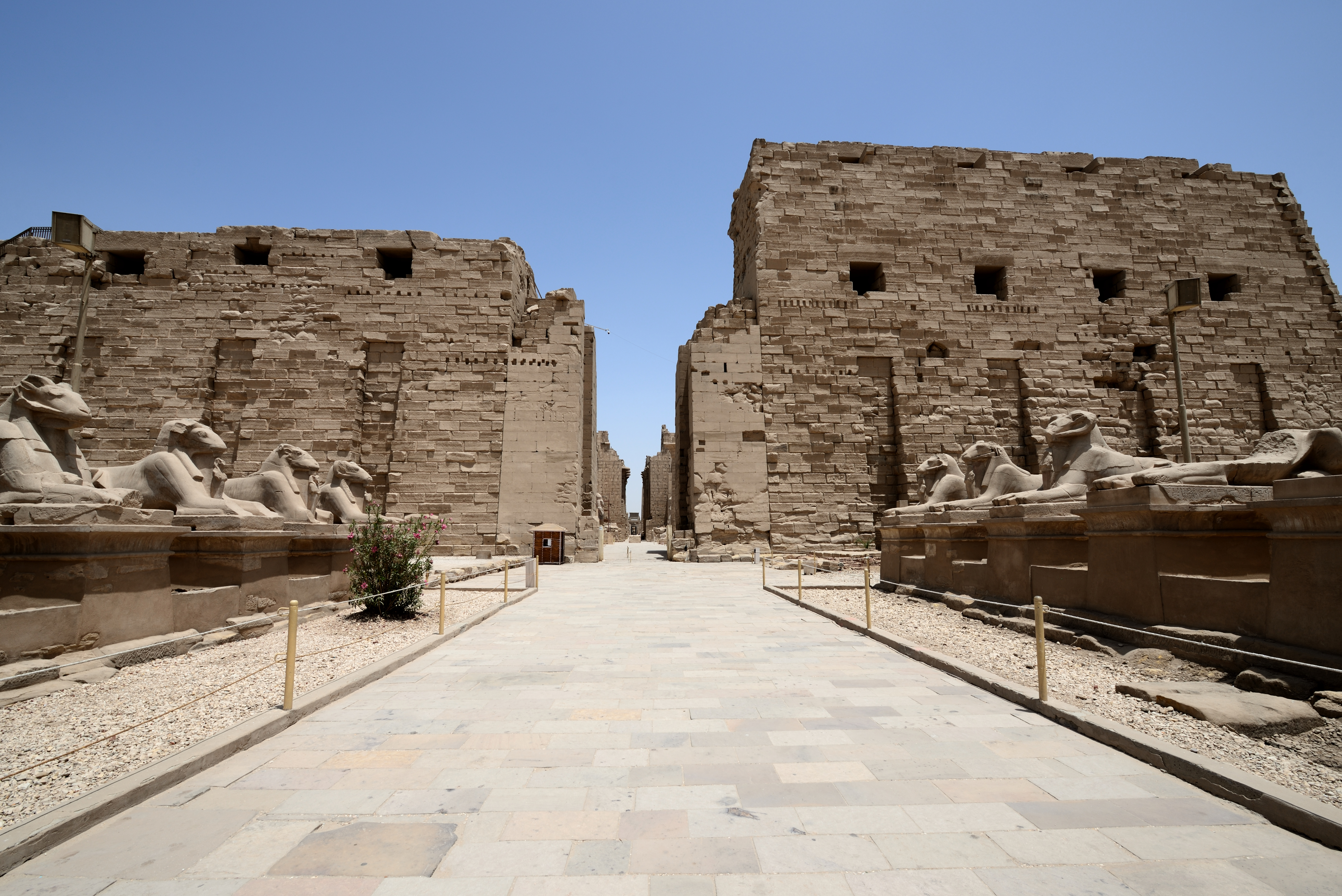
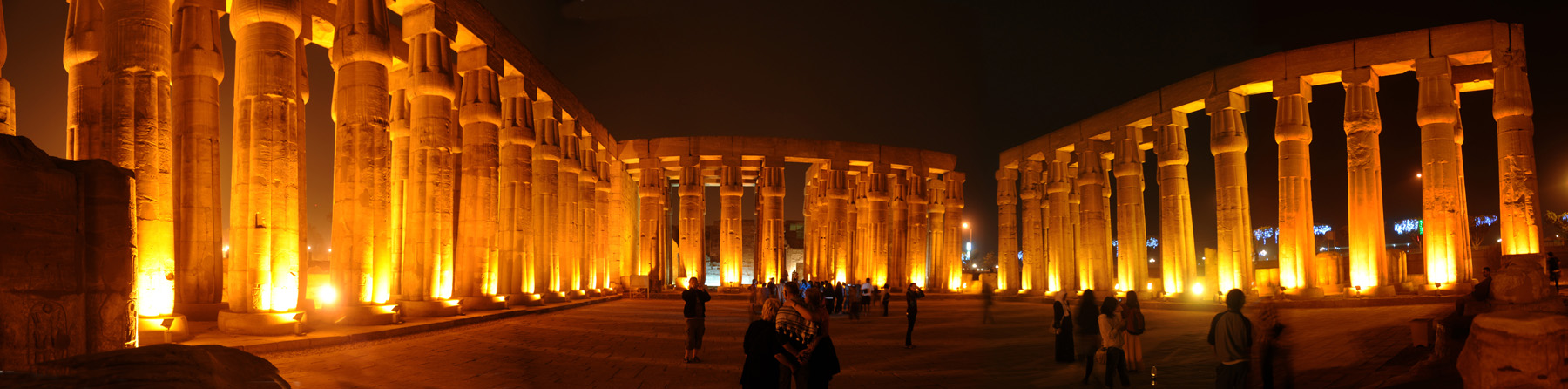
- City view of Luxor on the east bank of the Nile River Luxor Museum Hatshepsut temple Luxor Corniche Karnak Luxor temple

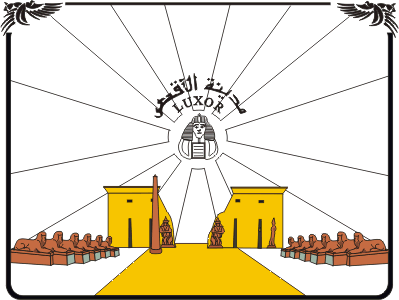
- Flag
- Nickname: City of Palaces
- Location of Luxor within Egypt Luxor (Africa)
- Coordinates: 25°41′48″N 32°38′40″E
- Country: Egypt
- Governorate: Luxor
- Founded: 3200 BC

Area
  - Total: 416.0 km^{2} (160.6 sq mi)
- Elevation: 89 m (292 ft)

Population (2023)
  - Total: 284,952
  - Density: 685.0/km^{2} (1,774/sq mi)
- Demonym(s): Uqsuri (Male, Arabic: أقصري) Uqsuriyah (Female, Arabic: أقصرية)

GDP
  - Total: EGP 47 billion (US$ 3 billion)
- Time zone: UTC+2 (EGY)
  - Summer (DST): UTC+3 (EEST)
- Postal code: 85511
- Area code: (+20) 95
- Website: www.luxor.gov.eg

Luxor (Note: Arabic: الأقصر, romanized: al-ʾuqṣur, lit. 'the palaces') is a city in Upper Egypt. Luxor had a population of 284,952 in 2023, with an area of 43.0 km^{2} (16.6 sq mi) and is the capital of the Luxor Governorate. Nicknamed the City of a Hundred Gates or the City of the Sun, formerly known as Thebes. It was one of the capitals of Ancient Egypt. The city is among the oldest continuously inhabited cities in the world.

Luxor has frequently been characterized as the ''world's greatest open-air museum'', as the ruins of the Egyptian temple complexes at Karnak and Luxor stand within the modern city. Immediately opposite, across the River Nile, lie the monuments, temples, and tombs of the West Bank Theban Necropolis, which includes the Valley of the Kings and the Valley of the Queens. Luxor is a major destination for tourism, with its large hotels and resorts, known also for its famous hot air balloons. The city also contains diversified cultural heritage such as temples, churches, and mosques, co-existing side by side. Around 5 million tourists from around the world arrive annually to visit Luxor's attractions, making a significant contribution to the modern city's economy.

The city is located between latitudes 25-26 North and 32-33 East. It is about 670 km from the Egyptian capital, Cairo, about 220 km north of Aswan. Luxor covers an area of approximately 416 km², with a populated area of 208 km², and its population is estimated at approximately 284,952 in 2023. The nearest seaport to the city is Safaga Port, and the nearest airport is the city's Luxor International Airport.

== Etymology ==
The name Luxor (Note: Arabic: الأقصر, romanized: al-ʾuqṣur, lit. 'the palaces', pronounced /ˈlʌksɔːr, ˈlʊk-/, Egyptian Arabic pronunciation: [ˈloʔsˤoɾ], Upper Egyptian: [ˈloɡsˤor]) originates from Arabic قصر qaṣr 'castle, palace', in the plural form al-quṣūr 'the palaces'. (Note: Qasr may be a loanword from Latin castrum 'fortified camp'.) It may be equivalent to the Greek and Coptic toponym τὰ Τρία Κάστρα tà Tría Kástra and ⲡϣⲟⲙⲧ ⲛ̀ⲕⲁⲥⲧⲣⲟⲛ pshomt enkastron respectively, which both mean 'three castles'.

The Sahidic Coptic name Pape (Note: Coptic: ⲡⲁⲡⲉ, Coptic pronunciation: [ˈpapə]) comes from Demotic Ỉp.t meaning 'the adyton', which, in turn, is descended from older Egyptian. The Greek forms Ἀπις and Ὠφιεῖον originate from the same source. The Egyptian village of Aba al-Waqf (Note: Arabic: أبا الوقف, Ancient Greek: Ωφις) has the same etymology.

The Greek name is Thebes Hekatompyloi (Ancient Greek: Θῆβαι ἑκατομπυλοι Thêbai Hekatompyloi) or Diospolis. The Egyptian name of the city is Waset, also known as Nut (Egyptian nwt, Coptic: ⲛⲏ), written as

i pA t pr

and

i p t O45 M24 t N21 Z1

.

== History ==
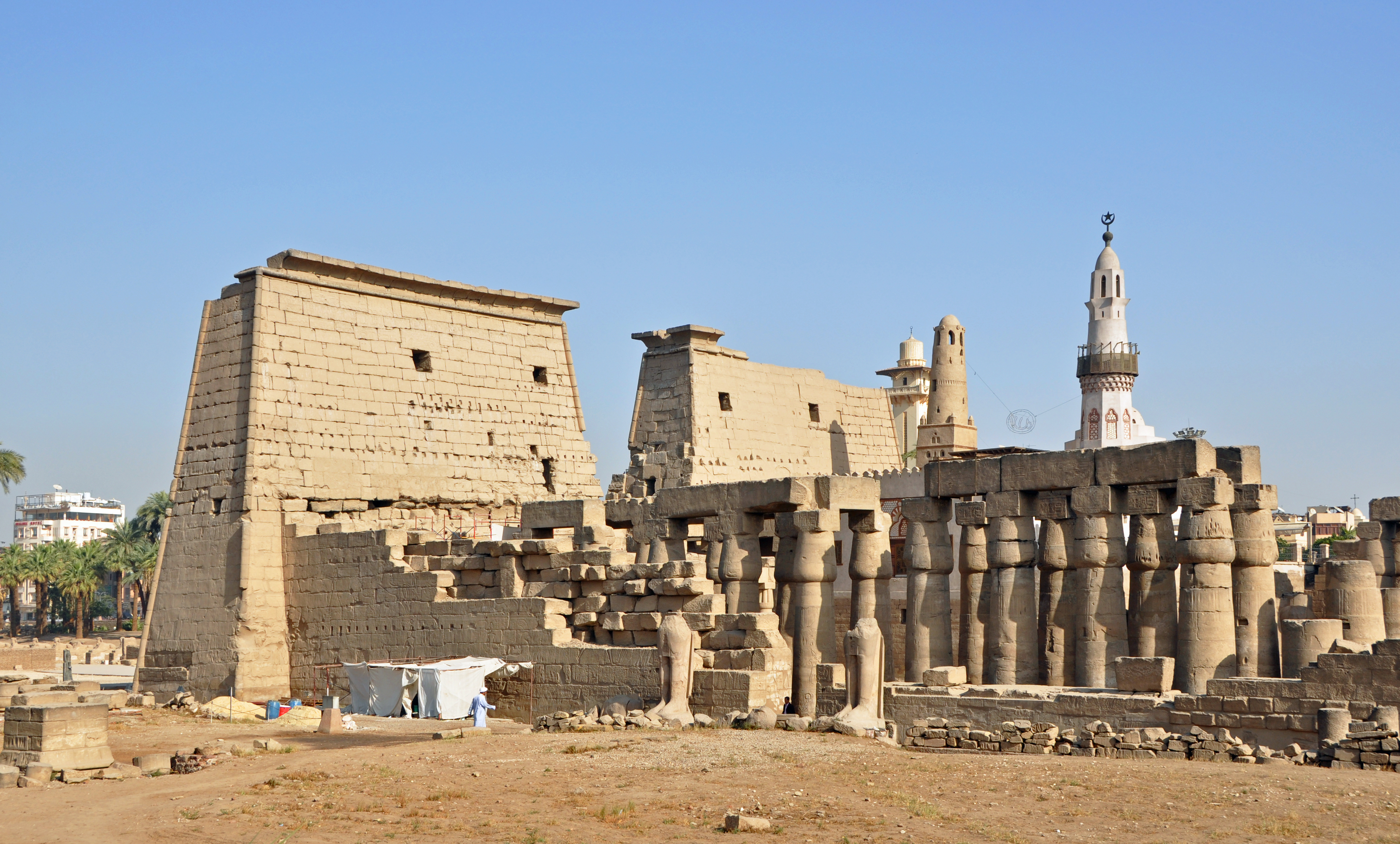
Luxor Temple, seen from the east bank of the Nile

Luxor was the ancient city of Thebes, the capital of Upper Egypt during the New Kingdom, and the city of Amun, later to become the god Amun-Ra. The city was regarded in the ancient Egyptian texts as wAs.t (approximate pronunciation: "Waset"), which meant "city of the sceptre", and later in Demotic Egyptian as ta jpt (conventionally pronounced as "tA ipt" and meaning "the shrine/temple", referring to the jpt-swt, the temple now known by its Arabic name Karnak, meaning "fortified village"), which the ancient Greeks adapted as Thebai and the Romans after them as Thebae. Thebes was also known as "the city of the 100 gates", sometimes being called "southern Heliopolis" ('Iunu-shemaa' in Ancient Egyptian), to distinguish it from the city of Iunu or Heliopolis, the main place of worship for the god Ra in the north. It was also often referred to as niw.t, which simply means "city", and was one of only three cities in Egypt for which this noun was used (the other two were Memphis and Heliopolis); it was also called niw.t rst, "southern city", as the southernmost of them.

The importance of Luxor started as early as the 11th Dynasty, when the community grew into a thriving city. Montuhotep II, who united Egypt after the troubles of the First Intermediate Period, brought stability to the lands as the city grew in stature. The Pharaohs of the New Kingdom in their expeditions to Kush, in today's northern Sudan, and to the lands of Canaan, Phoenicia and Syria saw the city accumulate great wealth and rose to prominence, even on a world scale. Thebes played a major role in expelling the invading forces of the Hyksos from Upper Egypt, and from the time of the 18th Dynasty to the 20th Dynasty, the city had risen as the political, religious and military capital of Ancient Egypt.

The city attracted peoples such as the Babylonians, the Mitanni, the Hittites of Anatolia (modern-day Turkey), the Canaanites of Ugarit, the Phoenicians of Byblos and Tyre, and the Minoans from the island of Crete. A Hittite prince from Anatolia even came to marry with the widow of Tutankhamun, Ankhesenamun. The political and military importance of the city, however, faded during the Late Period, with Thebes being replaced as political capital by several cities in Northern Egypt, such as Bubastis, Sais and finally Alexandria.

However, as the city of the god Amun-Ra, Thebes remained the religious capital of Egypt until the Greek period. The main god of the city was Amun, who was worshipped together with his wife, the Goddess Mut, and their son Khonsu, the God of the moon. With the rise of Thebes as the foremost city of Egypt, the local god Amun rose in importance as well and became linked to the sun god Ra, thus creating the new 'king of gods' Amun-Ra. His great temple at Karnak, just north of Thebes, was the most important temple of Egypt right until the end of antiquity.

Later, the city was attacked by Assyrian emperor Ashurbanipal, who installed a new prince on the throne, Psamtik I. The city of Thebes was in ruins and fell in significance. However, Alexander the Great did arrive at the temple of Amun, where the statue of the god was transferred from Karnak during the Opet Festival, the great religious feast. Thebes remained a site of spirituality up to the Christian era, and attracted numerous Christian monks of the Roman Empire who established monasteries amidst several ancient monuments including the temple of Hatshepsut, now called Deir el-Bahri ("the northern monastery").

Following the Muslim conquest of Egypt, part of the Luxor Temple was converted from a church to a mosque. This mosque is currently known as the Abu Haggag Mosque today.

The 18th century saw an increase of Europeans visiting Luxor, with some publishing their travels and documenting its surroundings, such as Claude Sicard, Granger, Frederick Louis Norden, Richard Pococke, Vivant Denon and others. By the 20th century, Luxor had become a major tourist destination.

=== Archaeology ===
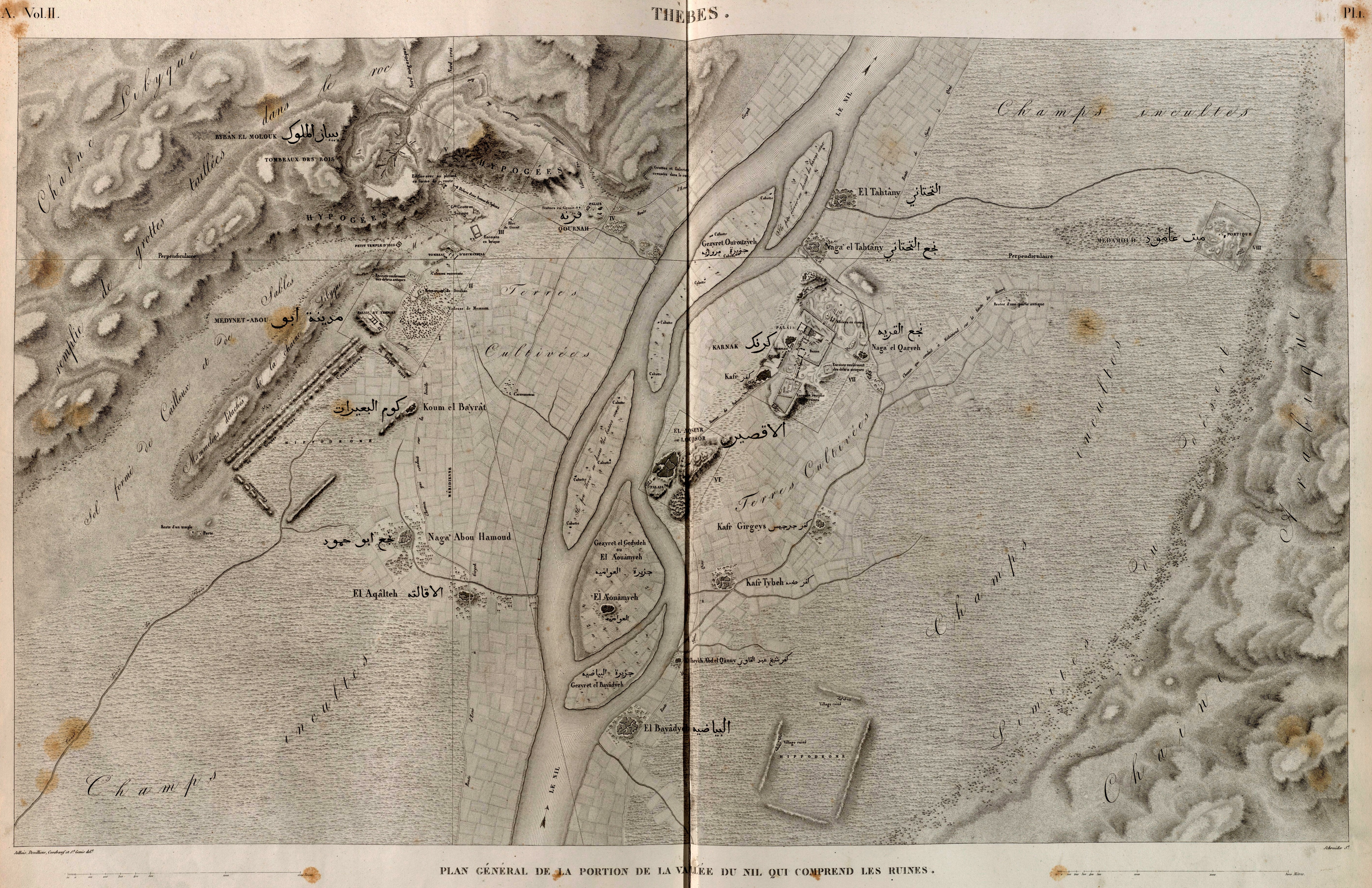
The area in 1809, from the Description de l'Égypte.

In April 2018, the Egyptian Ministry of Antiquities announced the discovery of the shrine of the Egyptian god Osiris: Ptah Neb, dating back to the 25th dynasty in the Temple of Karnak. According to archaeologist Essam Nagy, the material remains from the area contained clay pots, the lower part of a sitting statue and part of a stone panel showing an offering table filled with a sheep and a goose which were the symbols of the god Amun.

On the same day in November 2018, two different discoveries were announced. One was by the Egyptian Supreme Council of Antiquities that had found a 13th-century tomb on the West Bank belonging to Thaw-Irkhet-If, the overseer of the mummification shrine at the temple of Mut, and his wife. Five months of excavation work until this point had revealed colorful scenes of the family and 1,000 funerary statues or ushabti. The other discovery was of 1000 ushabti and two sarcophagi each containing a mummy in the TT33 complex by a joint team from the IFAO (French Institute of Oriental Archaeology, Cairo, Egypt) and the University of Strasbourg. One of the sarcophagi was opened in private by Egyptian antiquities officials, while the other, of a female 18th Dynasty woman named Thuya, was opened in front of international media.

In October 2019, Egyptian archaeologists, headed by Zahi Hawass, revealed an ancient "industrial area" used to manufacture decorative artefacts, furniture, and pottery for royal tombs. The site contained a big kiln to fire ceramics and 30 ateliers. According to Zahi Hawass, each atelier had a different aim – some of them were used to make pottery, others used to produce gold artefacts, and others still to churn out furniture. About 75 meters below the valley, several items believed to have adorned wooden royal coffins, such as inlaid beads, silver rings, and gold foil, were unearthed. Some artefacts depicted the wings of deity Horus.

In October 2019, the Egyptian archaeological mission unearthed thirty well-preserved wooden coffins (3,000 years old) in front of the Mortuary Temple of Hatshepsut in El-Assasif Cemetery. The coffins contained mummies of twenty-three adult males, five adult females, and two children, who are believed to be from the middle class. According to Hawass, mummies were decorated with mixed carvings and designs, including scenes from Egyptian gods, hieroglyphs, and the Book of the Dead, a series of spells that allowed the soul to navigate in the afterlife. Some of the coffins had the names of the dead engraved on them.

On 8 April 2021, Egyptian archaeologists led by Zahi Hawass found Aten, a 3,400-year-old "lost golden city" near Luxor. It is the largest known city from Ancient Egypt to be unearthed to date. The site was said by Betsy Bryan, professor of Egyptology at Johns Hopkins University to be "the second most important archaeological discovery since the tomb of Tutankhamun". The site is celebrated by the unearthing crew for showing a glimpse into the ordinary lives of living ancient Egyptians whereas past archaeological discoveries were from tombs and other burial sites. Many artefacts are found alongside the buildings, such as pottery dated back to the reign of Amenhotep III, rings, and everyday working tools. The site is not completely unearthed as of the 10th of April 2021.

In February 2025, a joint Egyptian-British archaeological team announced the discovery of the tomb of Thutmose II near Luxor, marking the first identification of a pharaonic royal tomb in over a century since that of Tutankhamun in 1922. Located west of the Valley of the Kings in an area known as Wadi C, the tomb—designated Wadi C-4—was identified through inscriptions on alabaster vessels bearing the names of Thutmose II and his wife, Hatshepsut. The tomb's interior featured fragments of funerary furniture and decorative elements, including blue-painted ceilings with yellow stars and religious texts. However, the site had suffered damage due to ancient flooding, which led to the deterioration of many of its original contents.

In May 2025, Egyptian archaeologists uncovered three ancient New Kingdom tombs at the Dra Abu el-Naga necropolis in Luxor, dating back over 3,500 years; the tombs belonged to high-ranking officials identified through inscriptions as Amum-em-Ipet, Baki (a grain silo supervisor), and “S” (a Temple of Amun supervisor, scribe, and northern oasis mayor). Each tomb features typical New Kingdom architectural elements such as courtyards, halls, burial shafts, and wall depictions of banquet scenes and funerary processions, offering new insights into elite burial customs in non‑royal Theban cemeteries.

In May 2025, a joint Egyptian–Canadian archaeological mission identified the owner of Kampp 23, a rock-cut tomb located in the El-Asasif necropolis, as Amun Mes, a high-ranking official who served as the mayor of Thebes during the Ramesside period. The tomb featuring a T-shaped layout typical of the 19th–20th Dynasties was first discovered in the 1970s but remained unattributed until recent excavations revealed inscriptions confirming Amun Mes's identity and several of his titles, including tax collector, royal advisor, divine father of Amun, and overseer of quarry expeditions. The team also found evidence of later reuse, such as painted plaster over original reliefs and fragments of ushabti figures.

== Landmarks ==
=== West bank ===
- Valley of the Kings
- Valley of the Queens
- Medinet Habu (Mortuary Temple of Ramesses III, etc.)
- The Ramesseum (memorial temple of Ramesses II)
- Deir el-Medina (workers' village)
- Tombs of the Nobles
- Deir el-Bahari (Mortuary Temple of Hatshepsut, etc.)
- Malkata (palace of Amenophis III)
- Colossi of Memnon (memorial temple of Amenophis III)
- Al-Asasif cemetery

=== East bank ===
- Luxor Temple
- Luxor International Airport
- Karnak Temple
- Luxor Museum
- Mummification Museum
- Winter Palace Hotel

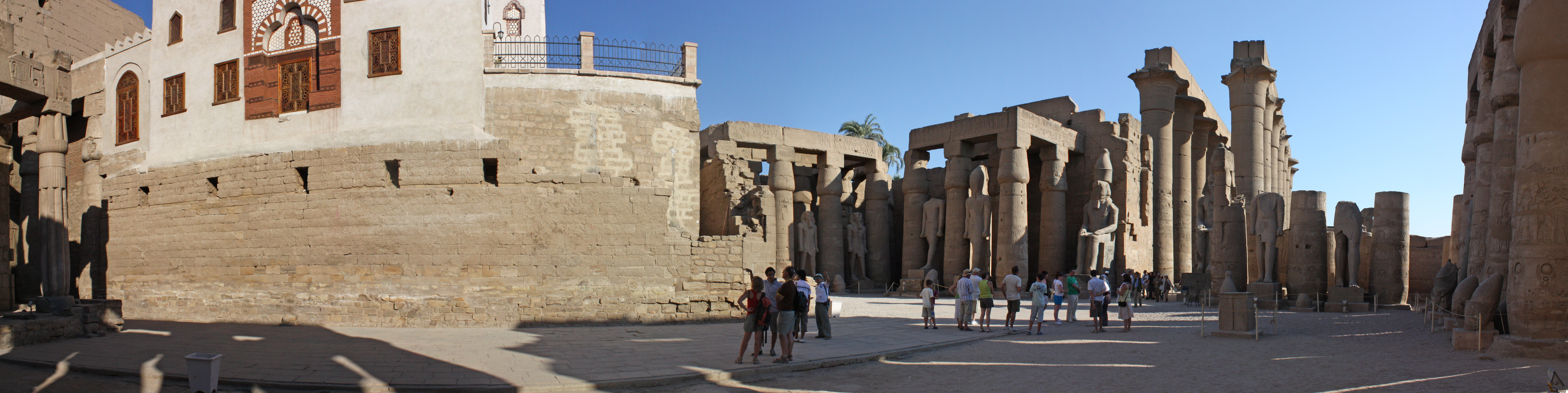
A panoramic view of the interior of the Luxor temple, just inside the entrance. The Abu Haggag Mosque, built over the ruins, is on the left.

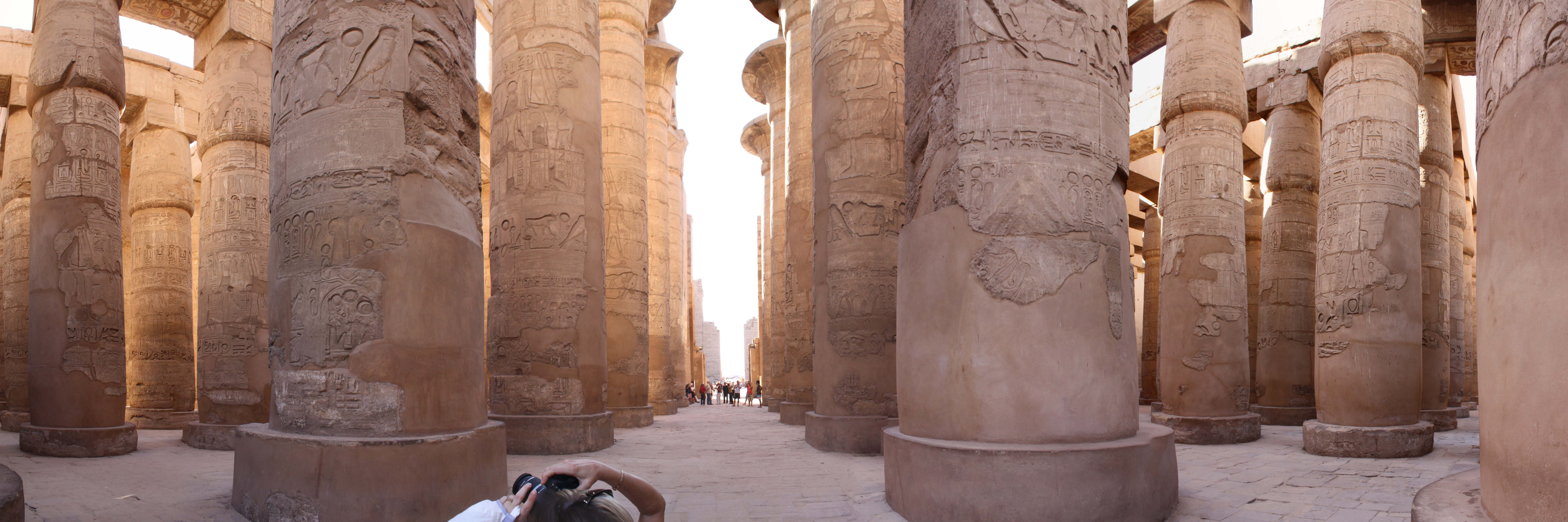
A panoramic view of the great hypostyle hall in the Precinct of Amun Re

== Geography ==
Approximately 4,000 years ago, a significant alteration in the geography of the Nile River occurred, particularly in the region near modern-day Luxor. This transformation involved the expansion of the floodplain, which increased the availability of arable land. This geographic and environmental shift likely played a crucial role in supporting the agricultural productivity that underpinned the prosperity and stability of ancient Egyptian civilization during that period and over the years.

=== Climate ===
Luxor has a hot desert climate (Köppen climate classification BWh) like the rest of Egypt. Aswan and Luxor have the hottest summer days of any city in Egypt. Aswan and Luxor have nearly the same climate. Luxor is one of the sunniest and driest cities in the world. Average high temperatures are above 40 °C (104 °F) during summer (June, July, August). During the coolest month of the year, average high temperatures remain above 22 °C (71.6 °F) while average low temperatures remain above 5 °C (41 °F).

The climate of Luxor has precipitation levels lower than even most other places in the Sahara, with less than 1 mm (0.04 in) of average annual precipitation. The desert city is one of the driest ones in the world, and rainfall does not occur every year. The air in Luxor is more humid than in Aswan, but still very dry. There is an average relative humidity of 39.9%, with a maximum mean of 57% during winter and a minimum mean of 27% during summer.

The climate of Luxor is extremely clear, bright, and sunny year-round, in all seasons, with a low seasonal variation, with about 4,000 hours of annual sunshine, very close to the maximum theoretical sunshine duration.

In addition, Luxor, Minya, Sohag, Qena, and Asyut have the widest difference of temperatures between days and nights of any city in Egypt, with almost 16 °C (29 °F) difference.

The hottest temperature recorded was on May 15, 1991, which was 50 °C (122 °F), and the coldest temperature was on February 6, 1989, which was −1 °C (30 °F).

Climate data for Luxor (1991–2020)
Month	Jan	Feb	Mar	Apr	May	Jun	Jul	Aug	Sep	Oct	Nov	Dec	Year
Record high °C (°F)	32.9 (91.2)	38.5 (101.3)	42.2 (108.0)	46.2 (115.2)	50.0 (122.0)	48.5 (119.3)	47.8 (118.0)	47.0 (116.6)	46.0 (114.8)	43.0 (109.4)	38.2 (100.8)	34.8 (94.6)	50.0 (122.0)
Mean maximum °C (°F)	29.2 (84.6)	32.4 (90.3)	37.8 (100.0)	41.9 (107.4)	44.6 (112.3)	45.8 (114.4)	45.9 (114.6)	45.4 (113.7)	43.3 (109.9)	40.5 (104.9)	34.9 (94.8)	30.2 (86.4)	46.7 (116.1)
Mean daily maximum °C (°F)	22.8 (73.0)	25.3 (77.5)	29.7 (85.5)	35.0 (95.0)	39.1 (102.4)	41.2 (106.2)	41.4 (106.5)	41.2 (106.2)	39.3 (102.7)	35.5 (95.9)	29.1 (84.4)	24.2 (75.6)	33.6 (92.5)
Daily mean °C (°F)	14.7 (58.5)	17.1 (62.8)	21.3 (70.3)	27.5 (81.5)	31.0 (87.8)	33.3 (91.9)	33.9 (93.0)	33.6 (92.5)	31.3 (88.3)	27.4 (81.3)	21.0 (69.8)	16.1 (61.0)	25.6 (78.1)
Mean daily minimum °C (°F)	7.1 (44.8)	8.9 (48.0)	12.8 (55.0)	17.5 (63.5)	22.1 (71.8)	25.0 (77.0)	25.7 (78.3)	25.6 (78.1)	23.3 (73.9)	19.6 (67.3)	13.4 (56.1)	8.6 (47.5)	17.4 (63.3)
Mean minimum °C (°F)	3.3 (37.9)	4.6 (40.3)	7.8 (46.0)	12.0 (53.6)	16.1 (61.0)	19.3 (66.7)	20.9 (69.6)	20.8 (69.4)	18.7 (65.7)	14.8 (58.6)	9.1 (48.4)	5.1 (41.2)	2.4 (36.3)
Record low °C (°F)	−0.3 (31.5)	−1.0 (30.2)	0.0 (32.0)	6.5 (43.7)	12.5 (54.5)	16.0 (60.8)	19.2 (66.6)	19.2 (66.6)	15.8 (60.4)	9.8 (49.6)	3.7 (38.7)	0.7 (33.3)	−1.0 (30.2)
Average precipitation mm (inches)	2.8 (0.11)	0.4 (0.02)	1.7 (0.07)	0.3 (0.01)	0.8 (0.03)	0.0 (0.0)	0.0 (0.0)	0.1 (0.00)	0.5 (0.02)	1.1 (0.04)	0.5 (0.02)	0.0 (0.0)	8.3 (0.33)
Average precipitation days (≥ 1 mm)	0.3	0.4	0.3	0.1	0.3	0.0	0.0	0.0	0.1	0.3	0.1	1.0	1.9
Average relative humidity (%)	55	47	39	31	29	27	30	33	37	43	51	57	39.9
Mean monthly sunshine hours	288.6	277.7	305.0	308.6	348.9	369.9	383.7	366.7	321.0	316.4	291.0	282.6	3,860.1
Percentage possible sunshine	80	83	85	88	90	93	92	91	89	86	84	79	87
Source 1: NOAA (humidity 1961–1990)
Source 2: Weather2Travel (sunshine hours)

== Coptic Catholic Eparchy ==
The Coptic Catholic (Alexandrian Rite) minority established on November 26, 1895, an Eparchy (Eastern Catholic Diocese) of Luqsor (Luxor) alias Thebes, on territory split off from the Apostolic Vicariate of Egypt. Its episcopal see is St. George cathedral in Luxor.

In turn, it lost territory on August 10, 1947, to establish the Eparchy of Assiut and again on 14 September 1981 to establish Sohag.

=== Suffragan Eparchs of Luxor ===
- Ignazio Gladès Berzi (March 6, 1896 – died January 29, 1925)
- Marc Khouzam (August 6, 1926 – August 10, 1947), also Apostolic Administrator of Alexandria of the Copts (Egypt) (December 30, 1927 – August 10, 1947); later Coptic Catholic Patriarch of Alexandria (10 August 10, 1947 – died February 2, 1958)
- Isaac Ghattas (June 21, 1949 – May 8, 1967), later Archbishop-Bishop of Minya of the Copts (Egypt) (May 8, 1967 – died June 8, 1977)
- Amba Andraos Ghattas, Lazarists (C.M.) (May 8, 1967 – June 9, 1986), also Apostolic Administrator of Alexandria of the Copts (Egypt) (February 24, 1984 – June 9, 1986), President of Synod of the Catholic Coptic Church (1985 – March 30, 2006), President of Assembly of the Catholic Hierarchy of Egypt (1985 – March 30, 2006), later Coptic Catholic Patriarch of Alexandria (June 23, 1986 – retired March 30, 2006), created Cardinal-Patriarch (February 21, 2001 – died January 20, 2009), also President of Council of Catholic Patriarchs of the East (2003–2006)
- Aghnatios Elias Yaacoub, Jesuits (S.J.) (July 15, 1986 – died March 12, 1994), previously Coadjutor Eparch of Assiut of the Copts (Egypt) (May 19, 1983 – July 15, 1986)
- Youhannes Ezzat Zakaria Badir (June 24, 1994 – December 27, 2015), previously Eparch (Bishop) of Ismayliah of the Copts (Egypt) (November 23, 1992 – June 23, 1994)
- Emmanuel (Khaled Ayad) Bishay (April 16, 2016 -

== Economy ==
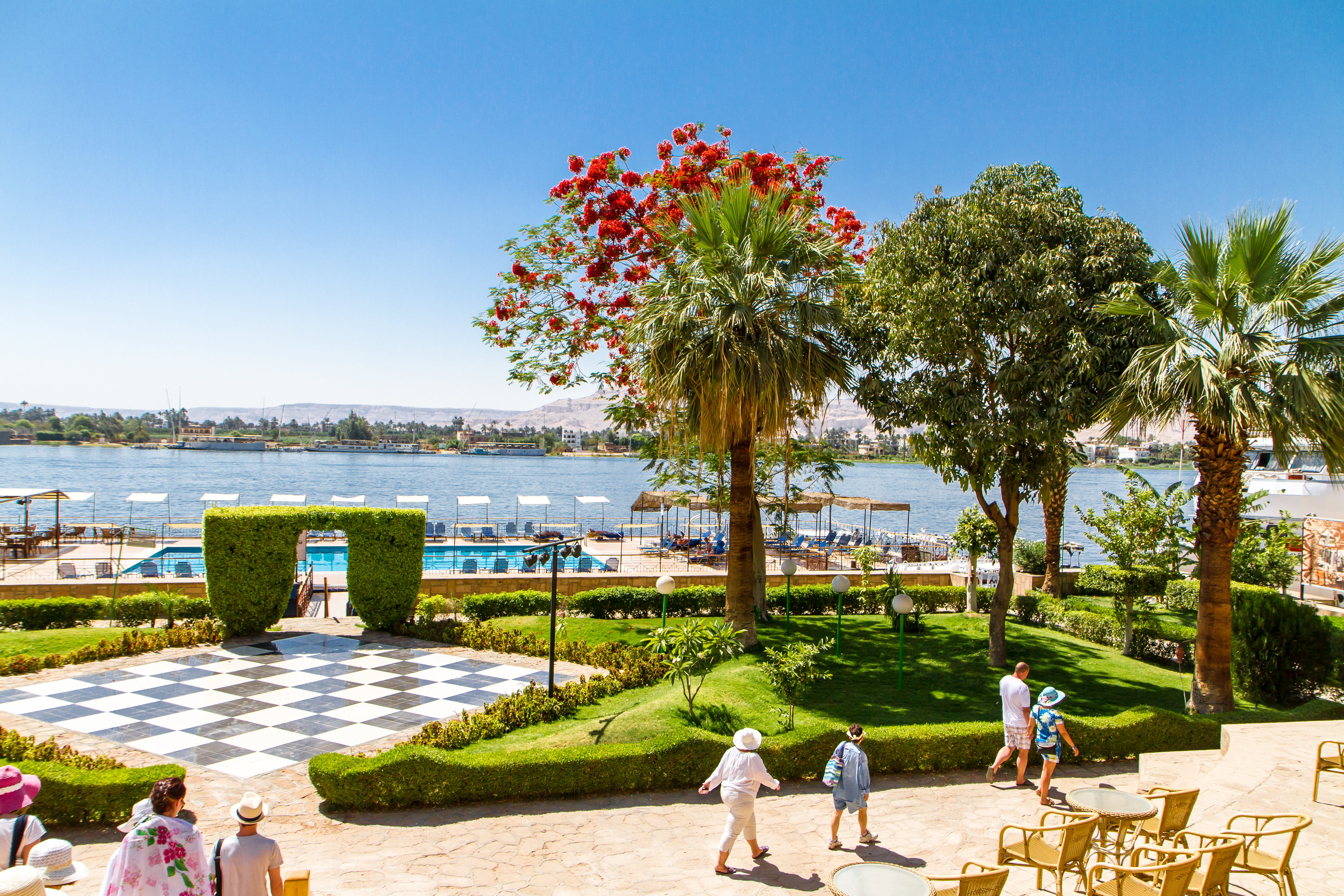
Luxor Corniche

Winter Palace Hotel overlooking the Nile

The economy of Luxor, like that of many other Egyptian cities, is heavily dependent on tourism. Since 1988, Luxor has been the only city that offers hot air balloon rides in Egypt, which is a common activity for tourists. Large numbers of people also work in agriculture, particularly sugarcane. There are also many industries, such as the pottery industry, used in eating, and many other uses.

The local economy was hit by the Luxor massacre in 1997, in which a total of 64 people (including 59 visiting tourists) were killed, at the time the worst terrorist attack in Egypt (before the Sharm el-Sheikh terrorist attacks). The massacre reduced tourist numbers for several years. Following the 2011 Arab Spring, tourism to Egypt dropped significantly, again affecting local tourist markets. Nineteen Asian and European tourists died when a hot air balloon crashed early on Tuesday, February 26, 2013, near Luxor following a mid-air gas explosion. It was one of the worst accidents involving tourists in Egypt. The casualties included French, British, Hungarian, Japanese nationals, and nine tourists from Hong Kong.

To make up for shortfalls in income, many cultivate their own food. Goat's cheese, pigeons, subsidized and home-baked bread, and homegrown tomatoes are commonplace among the majority of its residents.

== Tourism development ==
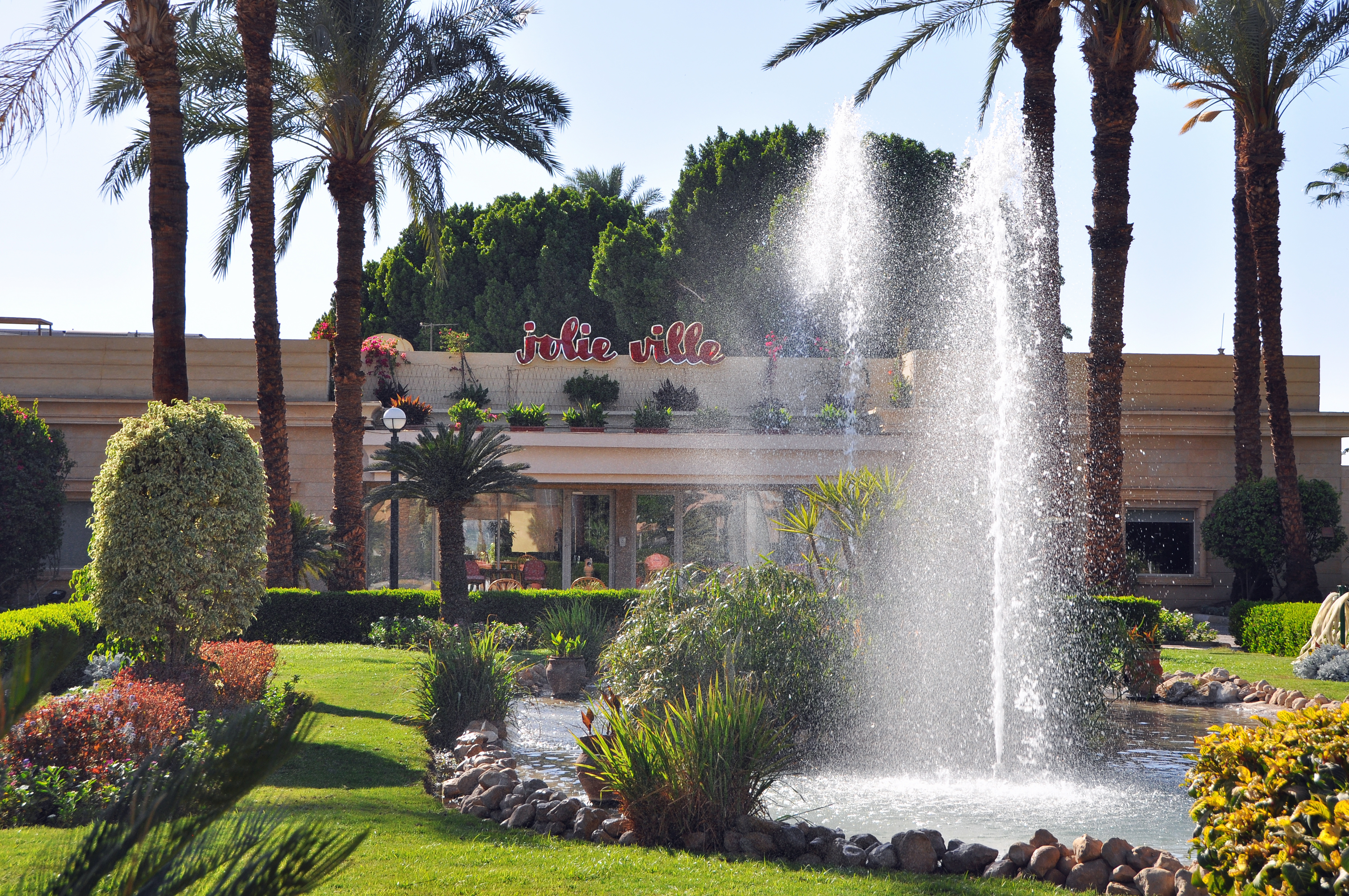
A resort entrance in the city

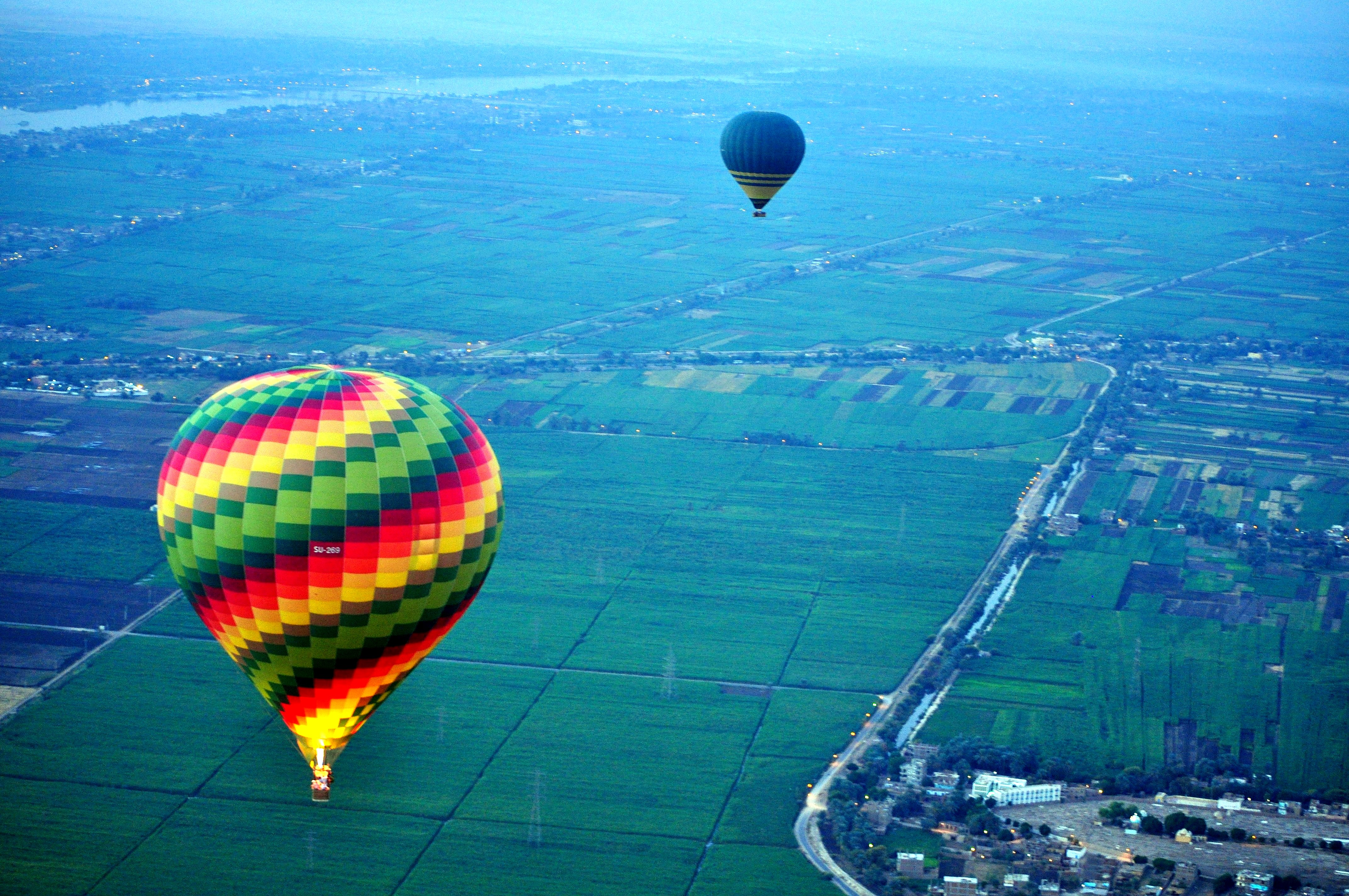
Hot air ballooning in Luxor

A controversial tourism development plan aims to transform Luxor into the biggest, vast open-air museum. The master plan envisions new roads, five-star hotels, glitzy shops, and an IMAX theatre. The main attraction is an 11 million dollar project to unearth and restore the 2.7 kilometres (1.7 miles) long Avenue of Sphinxes that once linked Luxor and Karnak temples. The ancient processional road was built by the pharaoh Amenhotep III and took its final form under Nectanebo I in 400 BCE. Over a thousand sphinx statues lined the road now being excavated, which was covered by silt, homes, mosques, and churches. Excavation started around 2004.

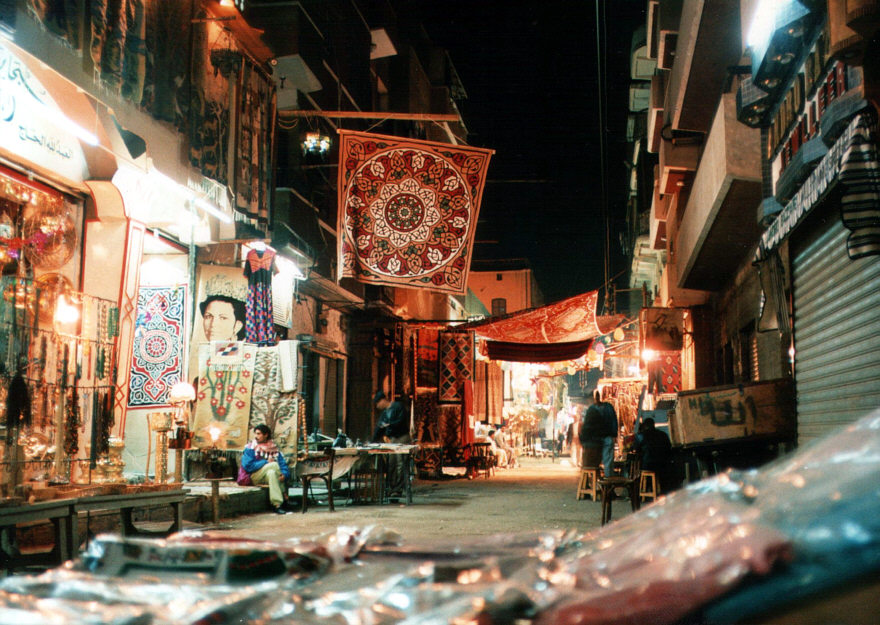
Street market

On 18 April 2019, the Egyptian Government announced the discovery of a previously unopened coffin in Luxor, dated back to 18th dynasty of Upper and Lower Egypt. According to the previous Minister of Antiquities Khaled al-Anani, it is the biggest rock-cut tomb to be unearthed in the ancient city of Thebes. It is one of the largest, well-preserved tombs ever found near the ancient city of Luxor. On 24 November 2018, this discovery was preceded by the finding of a well-preserved mummy of a woman inside a previously unopened coffin dating back more than 3,000 years.

== Infrastructure ==
=== Transport ===
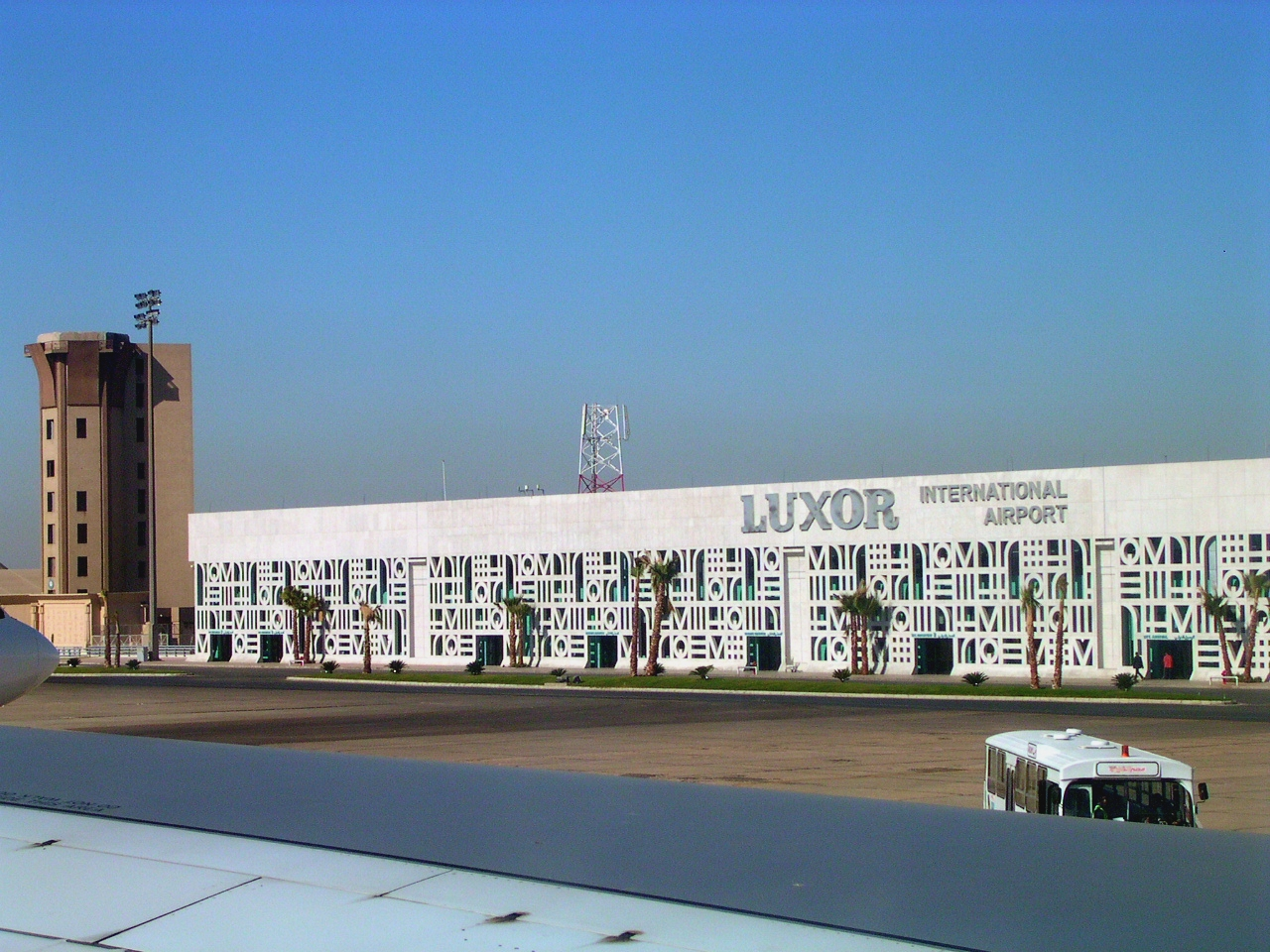
Luxor International Airport

Luxor is served by Luxor International Airport. It serves as the primary air gateway to Upper Egypt's historical treasures. Located approximately 6 kilometers (4 miles) east of Luxor's city center.

A bridge was opened in 1998, a few kilometres upstream of the main town of Luxor, allowing ready land access from the east bank to the west bank. Traditionally, river crossings have been the domain of several ferry services. The so-called 'local ferry' (also known as the 'National Ferry') continues to operate from a landing opposite the Temple of Luxor.

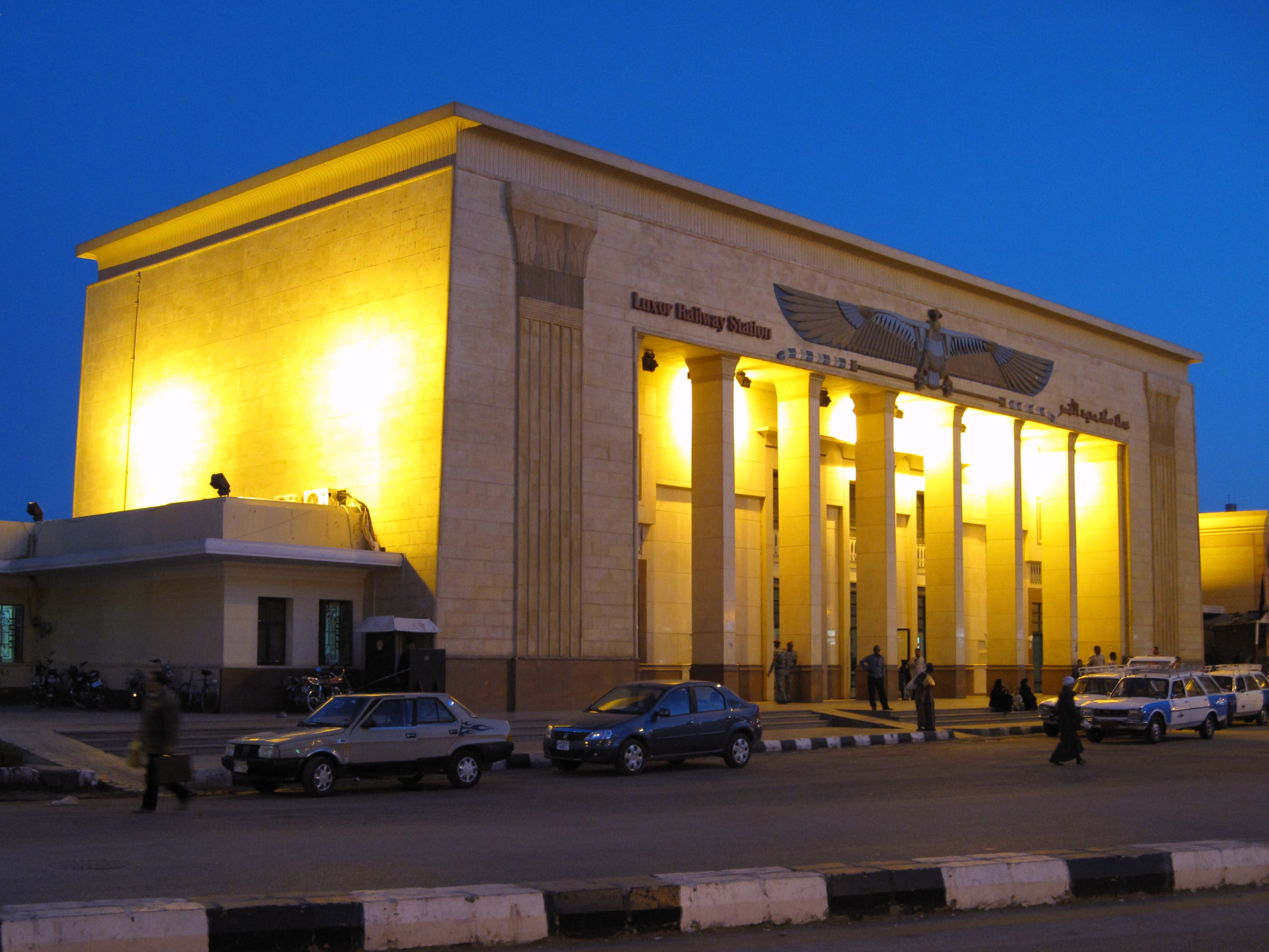
Luxor railway station, seen in 2011.

Transport to sites on the west bank is serviced by taxi drivers who often approach ferry passengers. There are also local cars that reach some of the monuments for 2 L.E., although tourists rarely use them. Alternatively, motorboats line both banks of the Nile all day, providing a quicker, but more expensive (50 L.E.) crossing to the other side.

The city of Luxor on the east bank has several bus routes used mainly by locals. Tourists often rely on horse carriages, called "calèches", for transport or tours around the city. Taxis are plentiful and reasonably priced, and since the government has decreed that taxis older than 20 years will not be relicensed, there are many modern air-conditioned cabs. Recently, new roads have been built in the city to cope with the growth in traffic.

For domestic travel along the route of the Nile, a rail service operates several times a day. A morning train and a sleeping train can be taken from the railway station situated around 400 metres (440 yd) from Luxor Temple. The line runs between several major destinations, including Cairo to the north and Aswan to the south.

=== Education ===
Luxor University, founded in 2019, is a non-profit governmental university that provides programs and courses for students.

Other universities include; Luxor National University (LNU) and Al-Azhar University Training Centers. School education in the city include; public primary and secondary schooling, Al-Azhar schools, and private international schools.

== Twin towns – sister cities ==
Luxor is twinned with:

- Baltimore, United States
- Brasília, Brazil
- (Georgia (country)) Kakheti, Georgia
- Kazanlak, Bulgaria
- Shenzhen, China
- Viterbo, Italy
- Yangzhou, China

== Notable people ==
- Meritaten, Egyptian Royal Wife, King's Daughter
- Ahmose-Nefertari, Egyptian queen consort
- Neferhotep I, Egyptian pharaoh
- Sobekhotep IV, Egyptian king
- Ahmed el-Tayeb, Egyptian Islamic scholar
- Bahaa Taher (1935–2022), Egyptian novelist
- Yusuf Abu al-Haggag (1150–1245), Egyptian Scholar and Saint of Luxor

== Gallery ==
Nile Street in Luxor

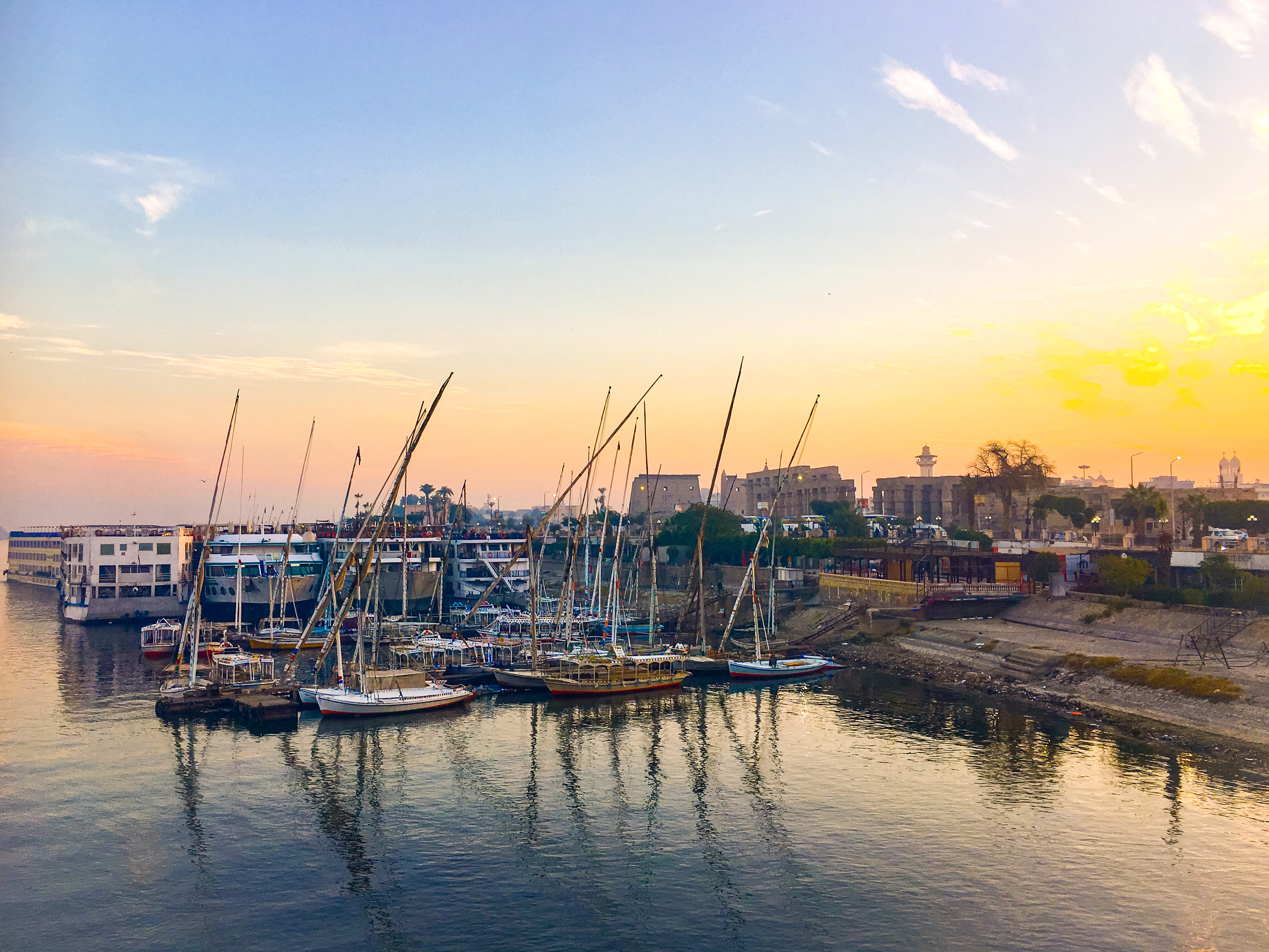
Luxor pier

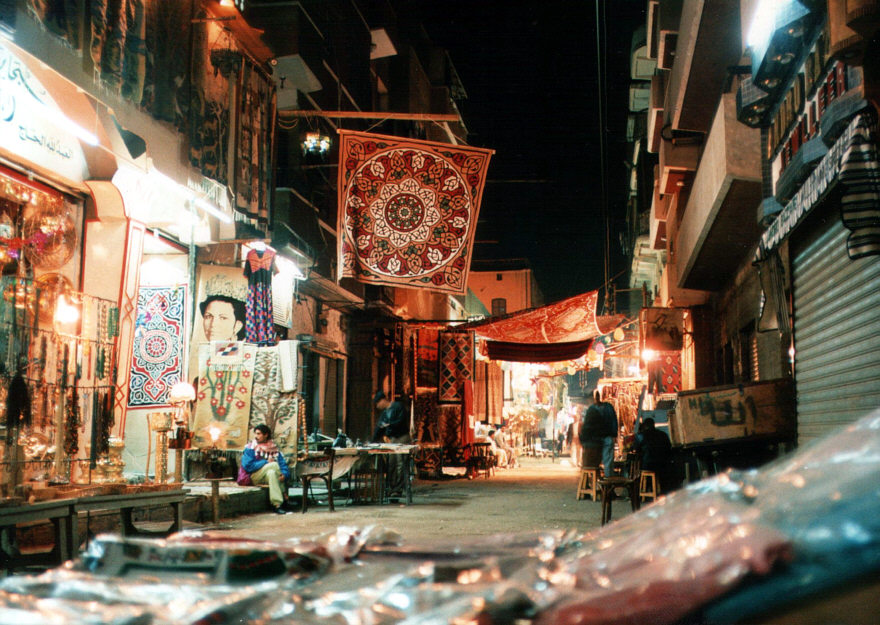
Street market in Luxor

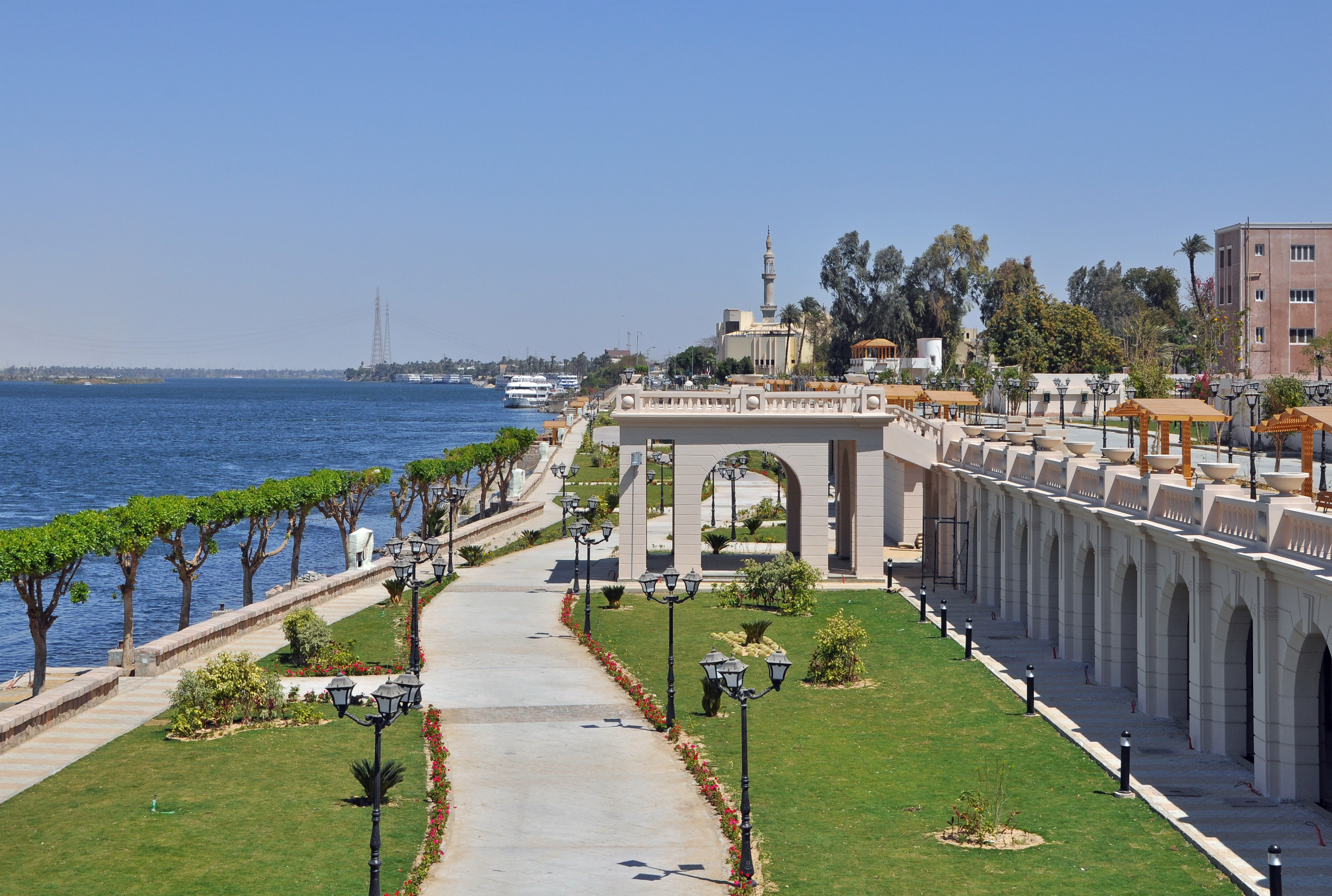
The New Corniche in Luxor

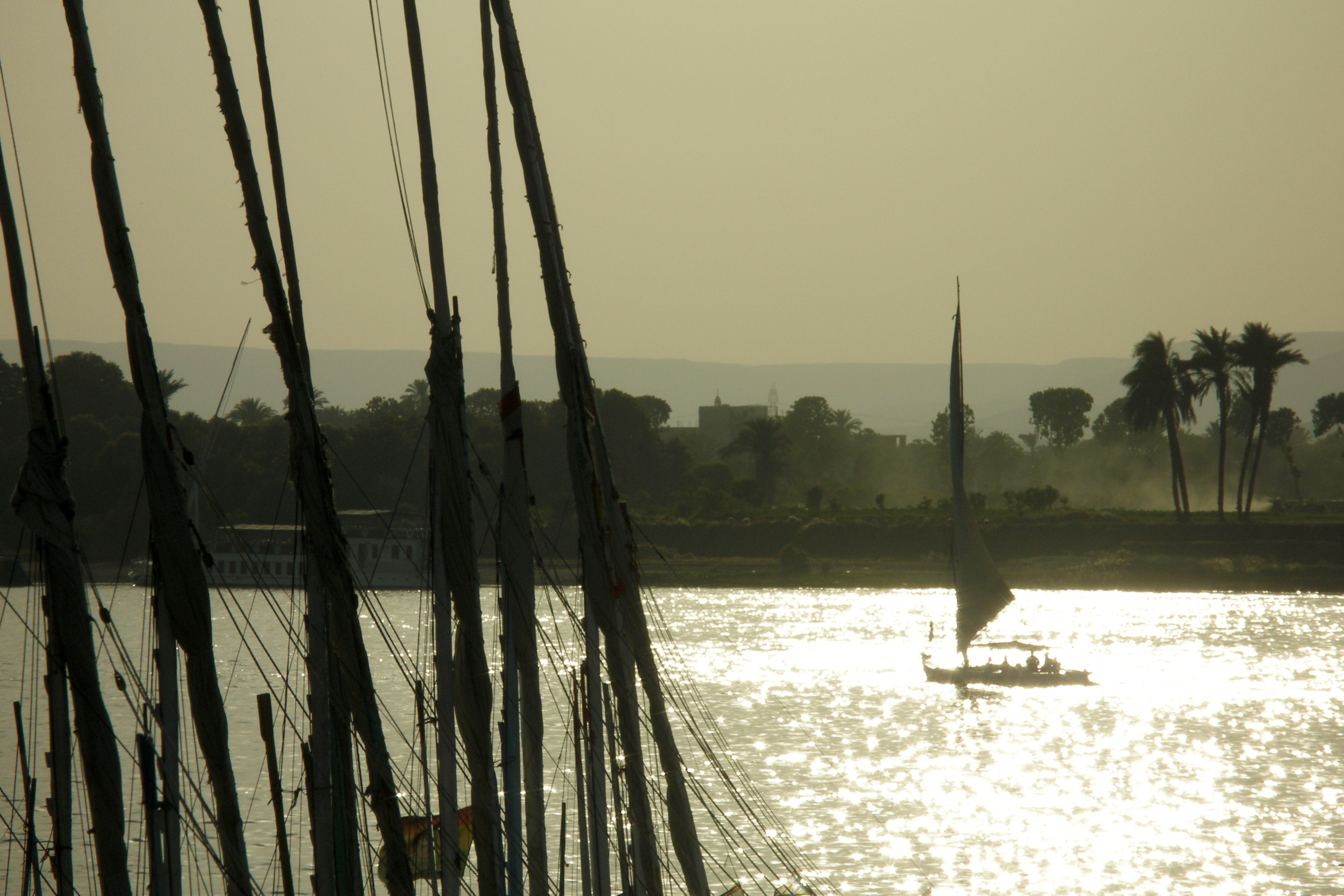
Sunset on Nile River in Luxor, Feluccas

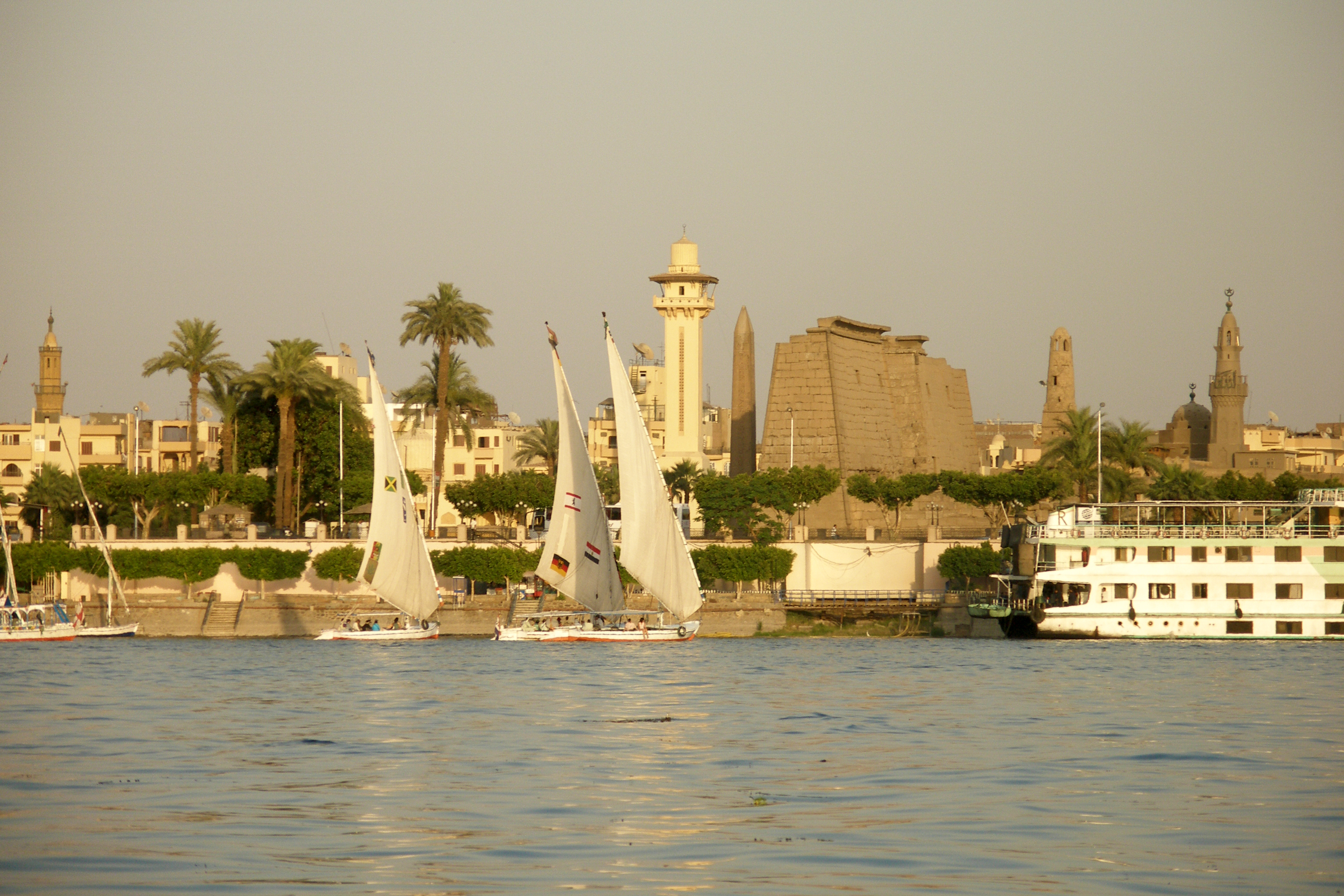
Luxor Temple as seen from the River Nile

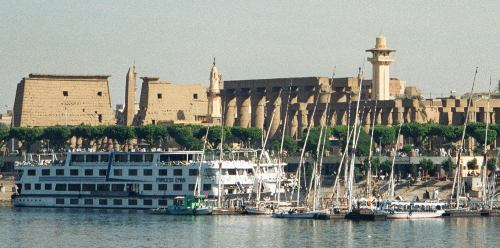
Panoramic view of Luxor

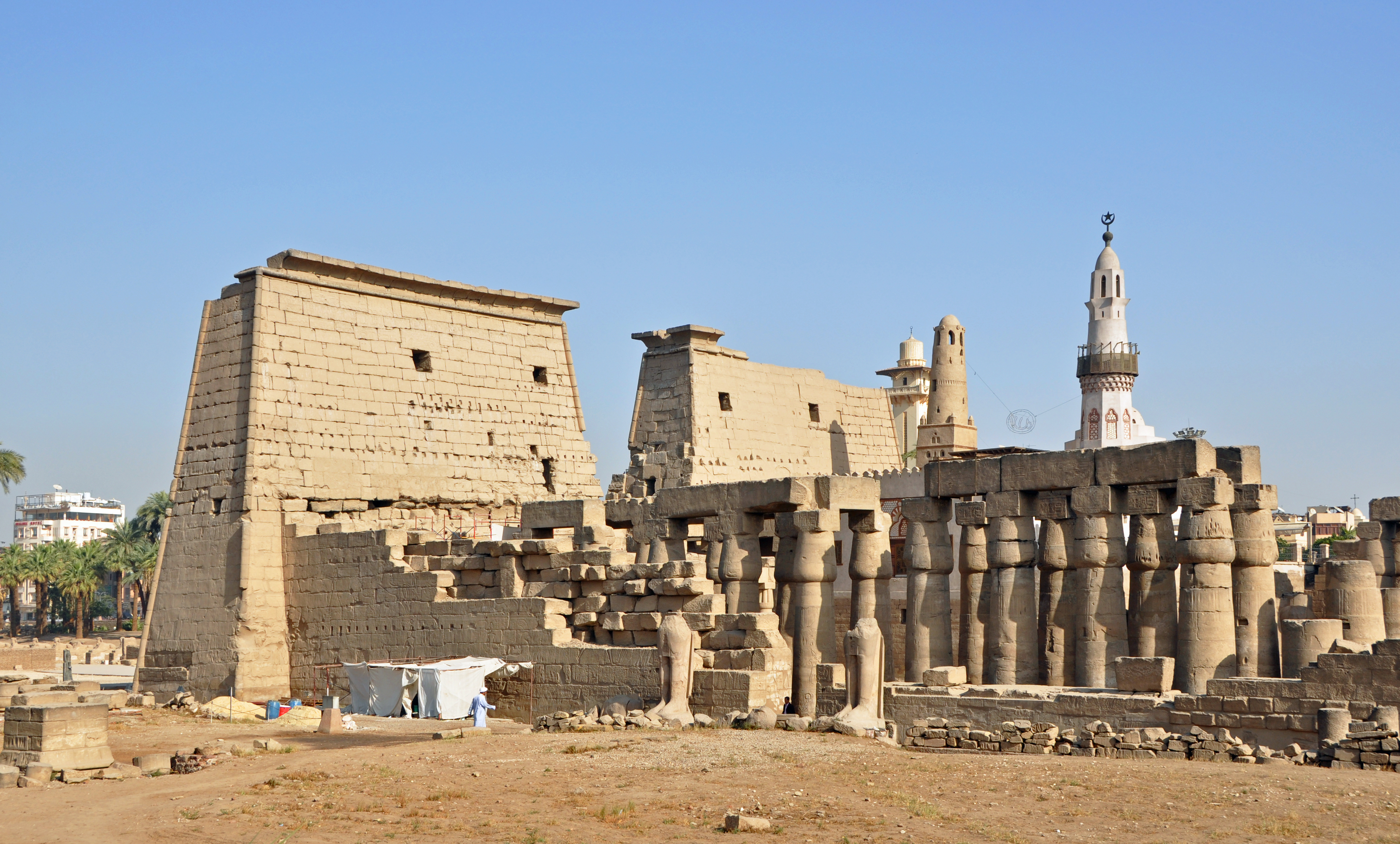
Luxor Temple

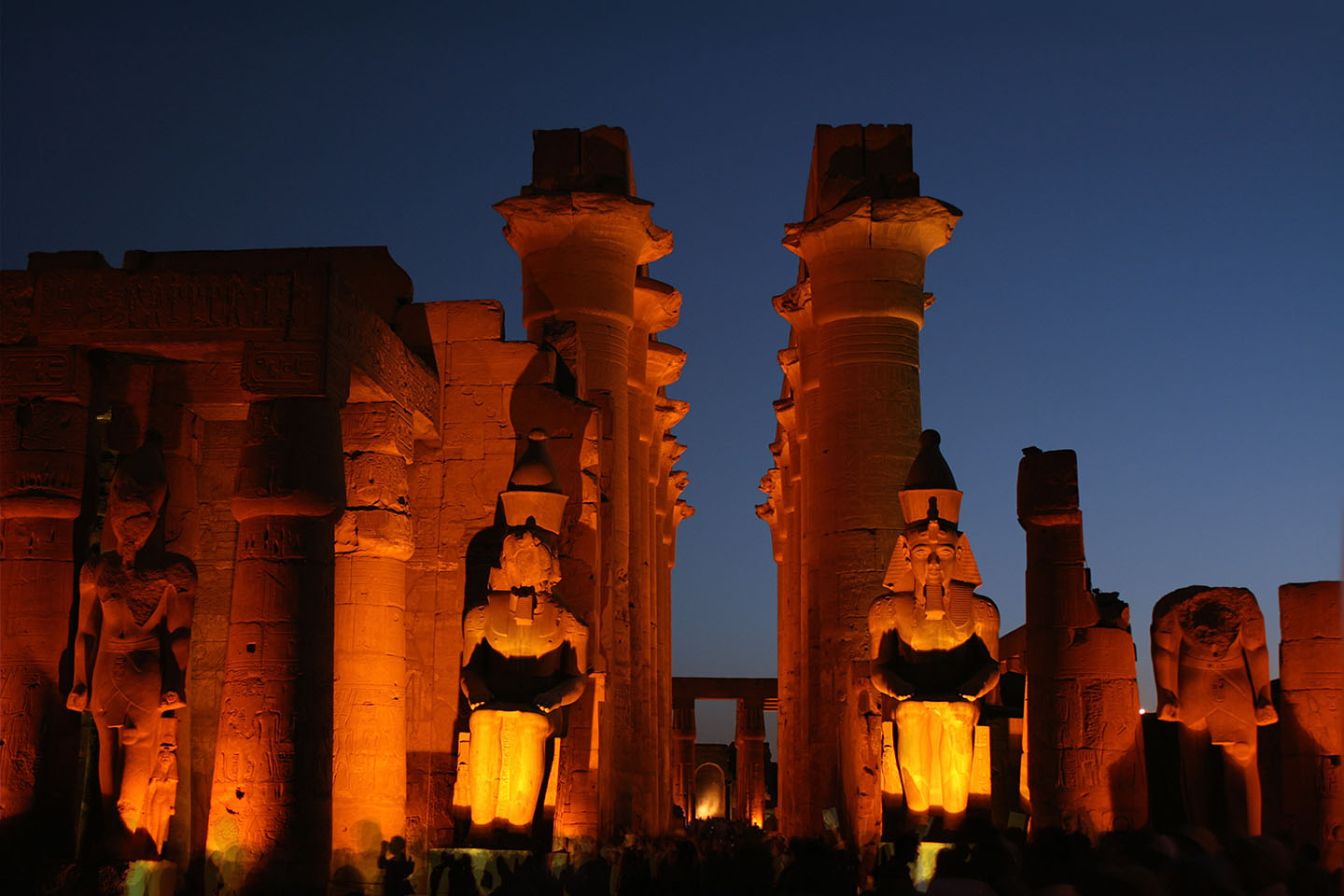
Central corridor and four colossi by night

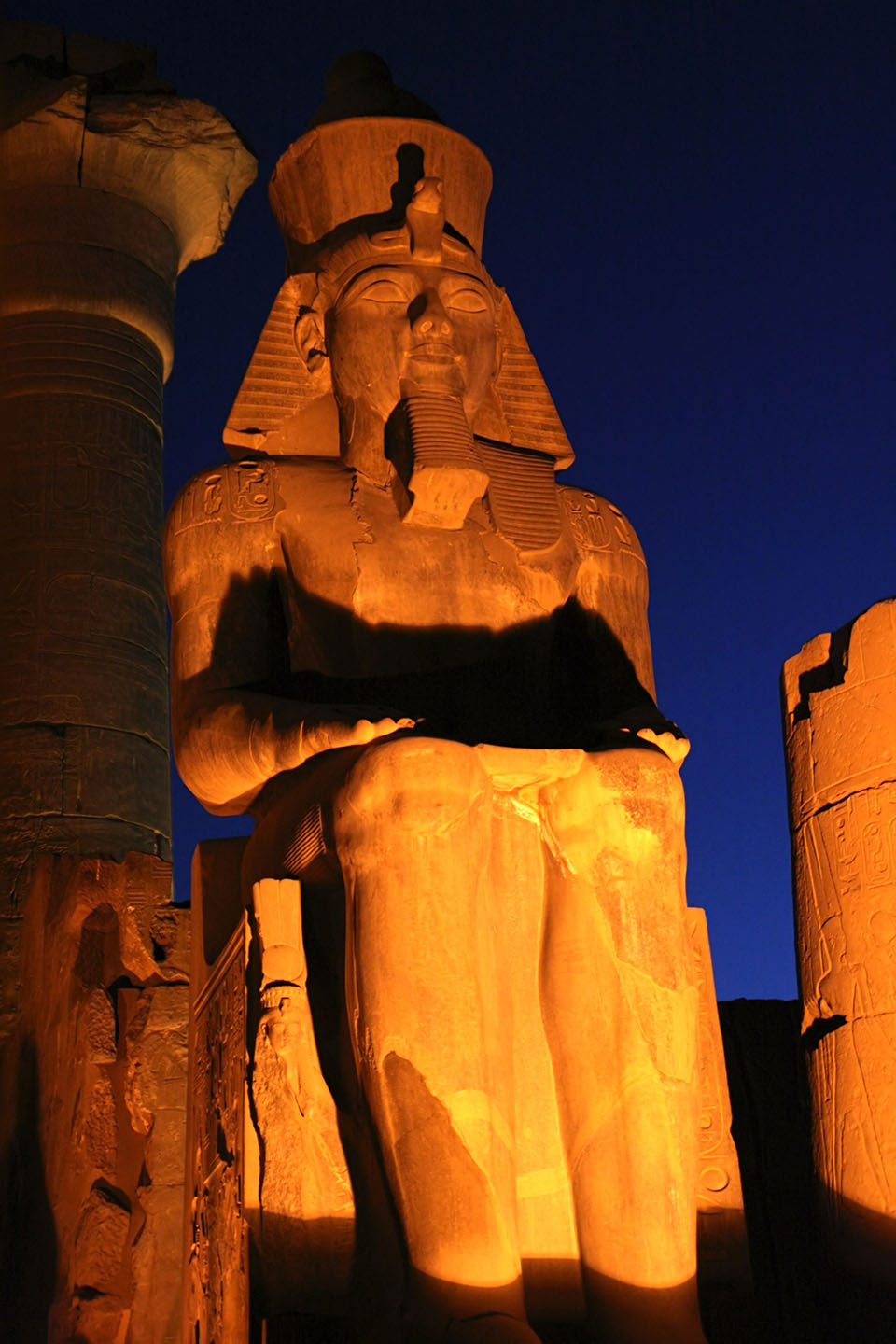
Ramesses II colossus inside Luxor Temple at night

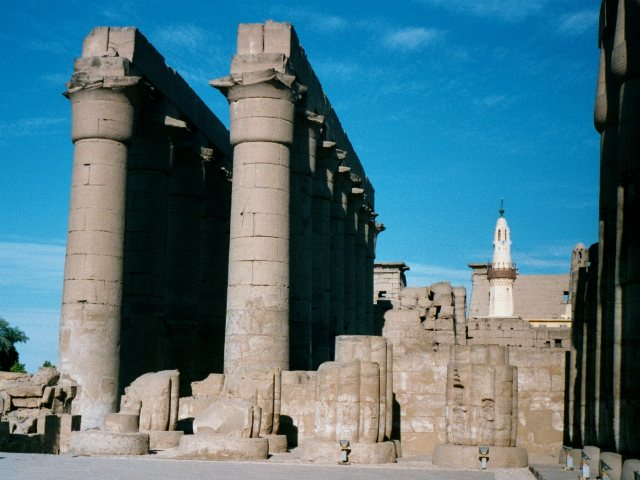
Amenhotep's colonnade from the peristyle court

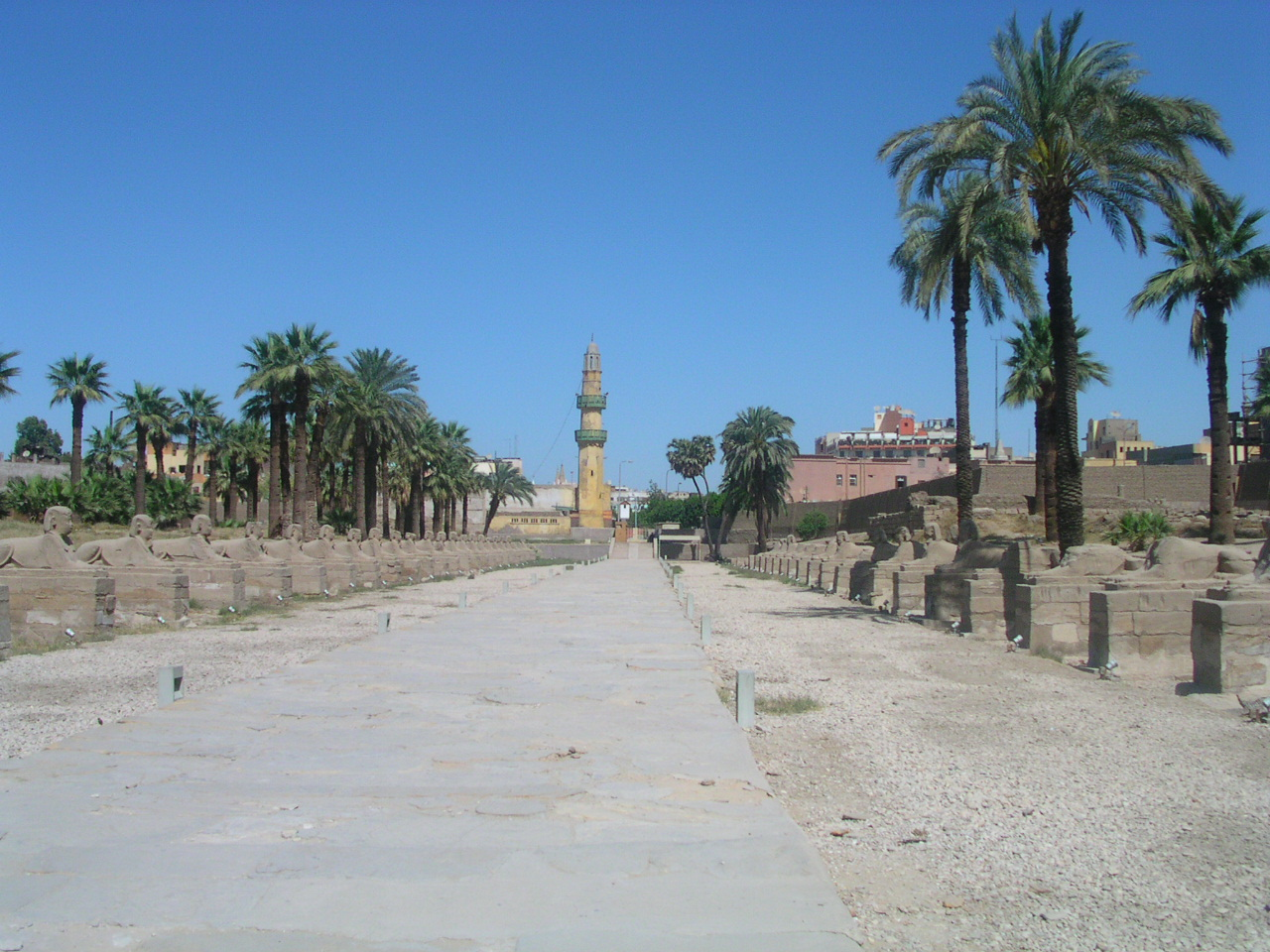
Hundreds of sphinxes once lined the road to nearby Karnak

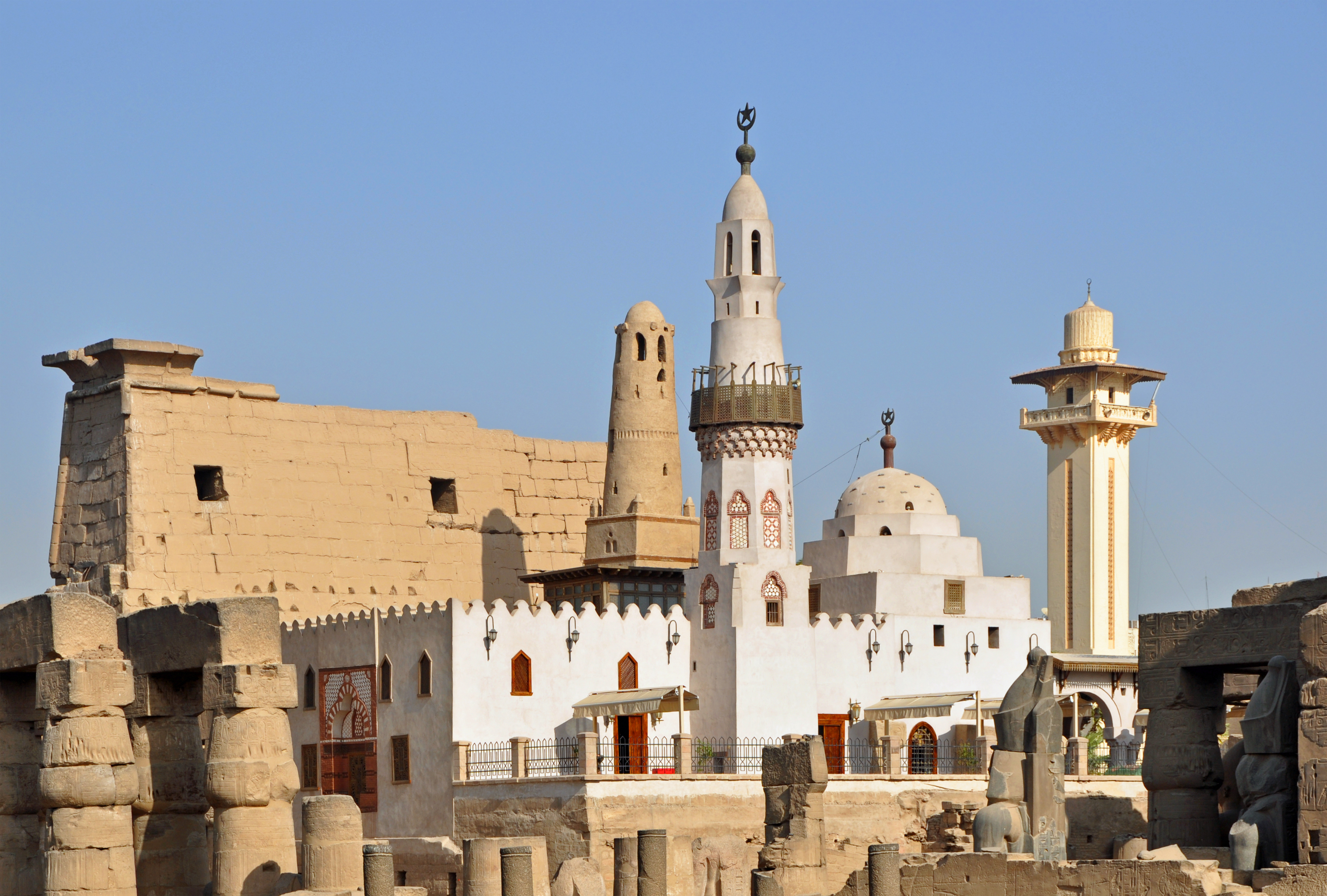
The Abu Haggag Mosque inside the temple

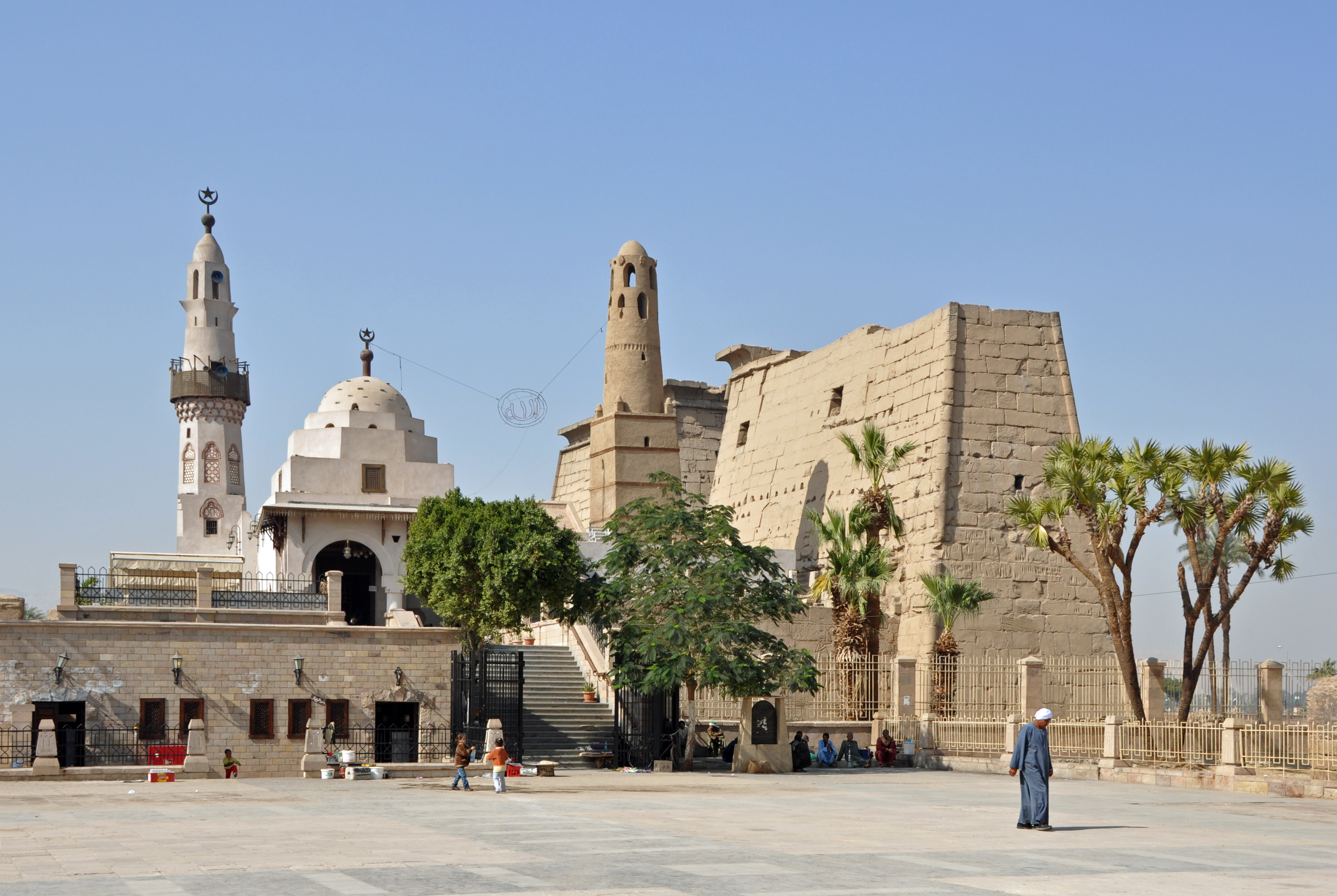
Luxor Temple and Abu Haggag Mosque

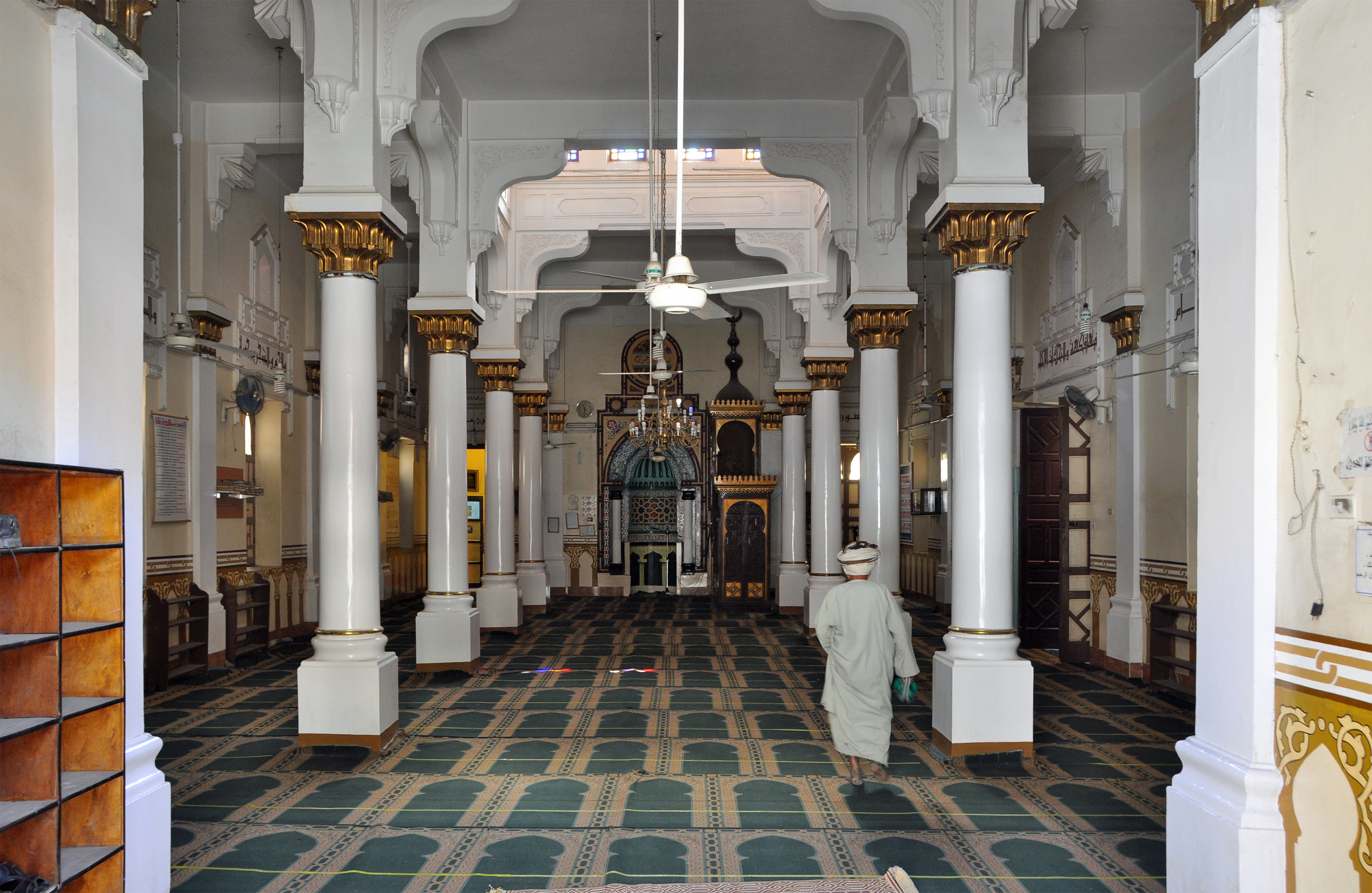
Mosque in Mansheya Street

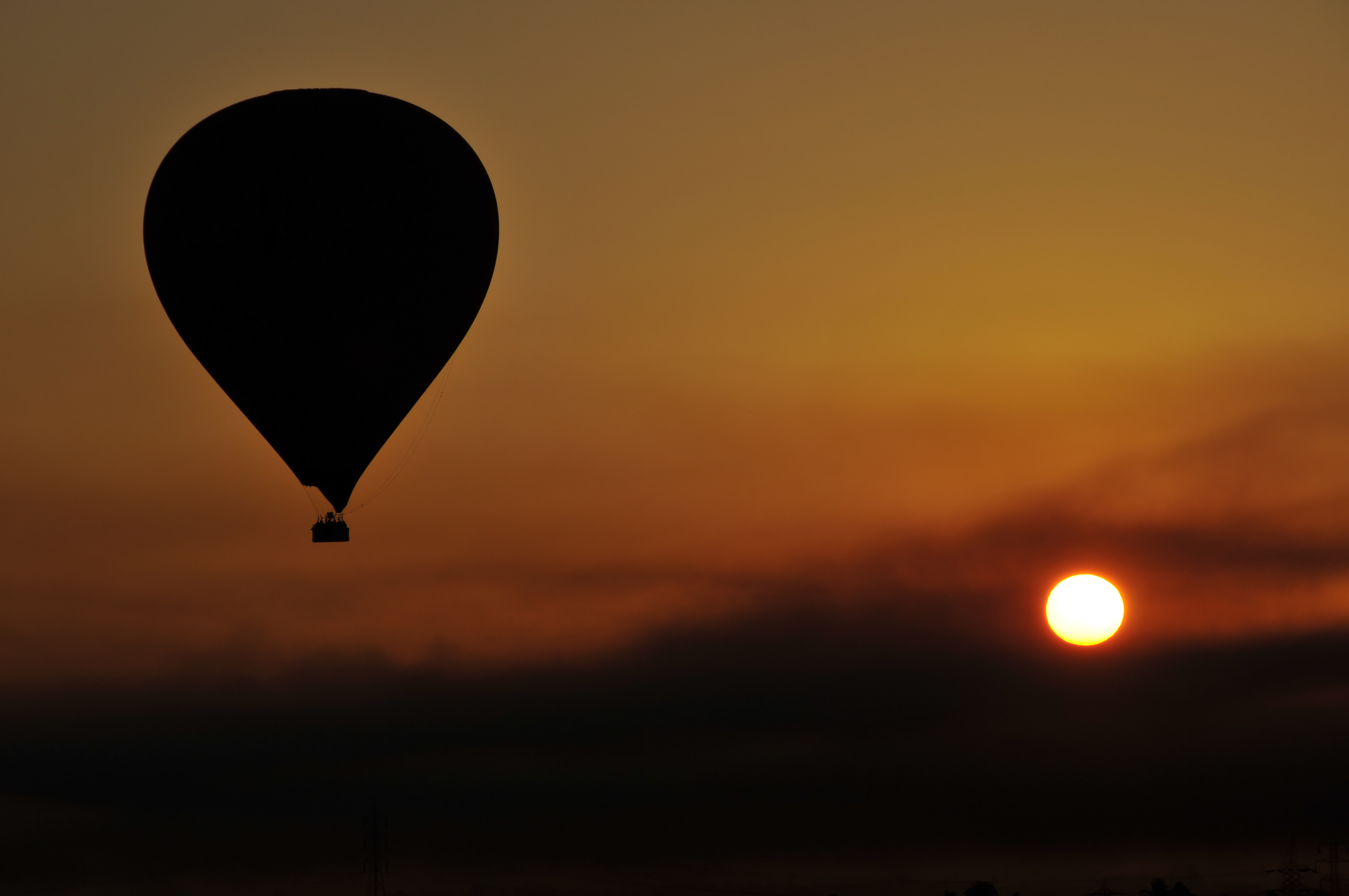
Hot Air Balloon In Luxor

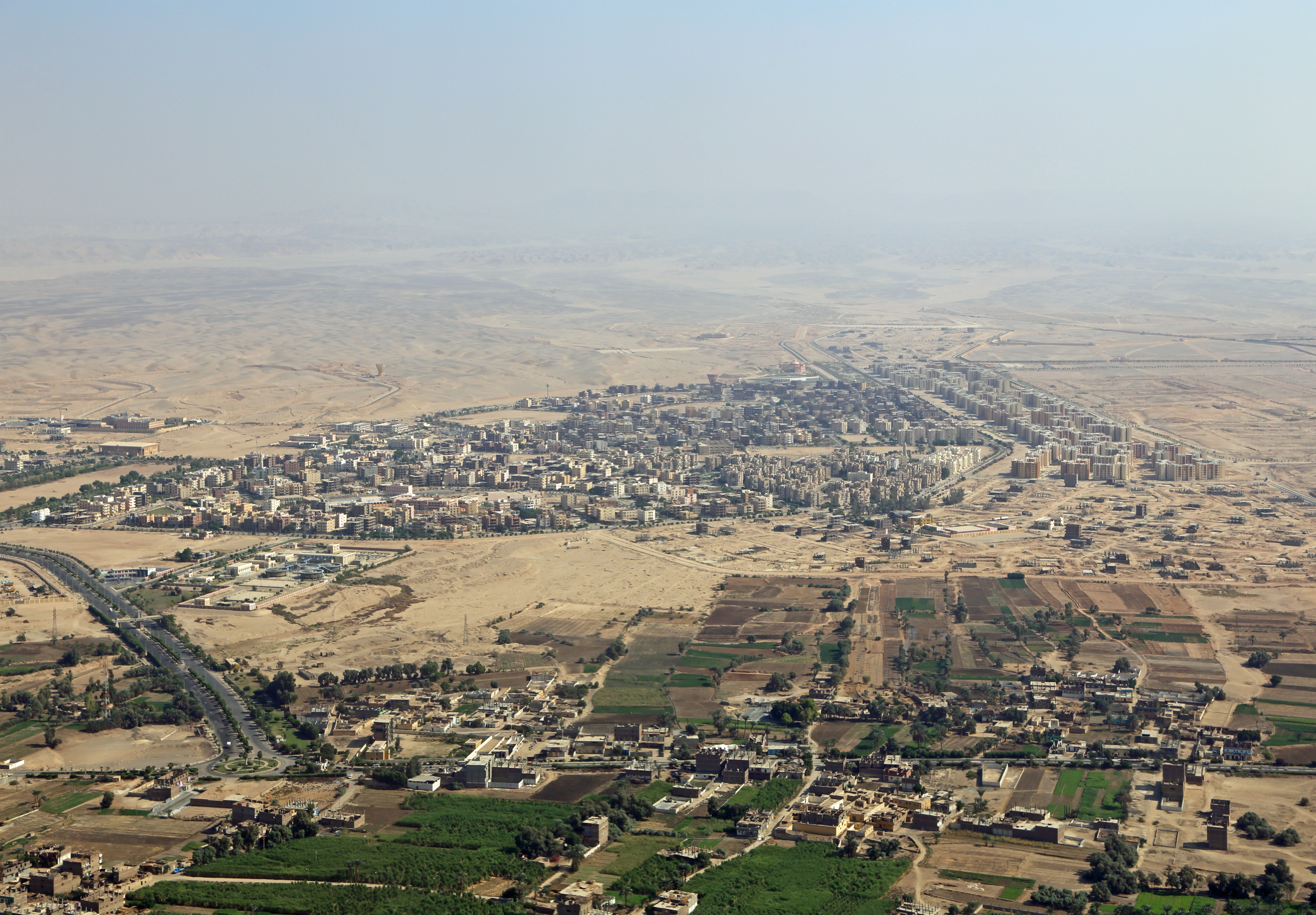
New Tiba City: extension east of Luxor, started in 2000

== See also ==
- Cultural tourism in Egypt
- Yusuf Abu al-Haggag
- List of cities in Egypt
- List of megalithic sites
- Luxor Las Vegas
