= 2013 Luxor hot air balloon crash =

Fatal balloon crash in Egypt

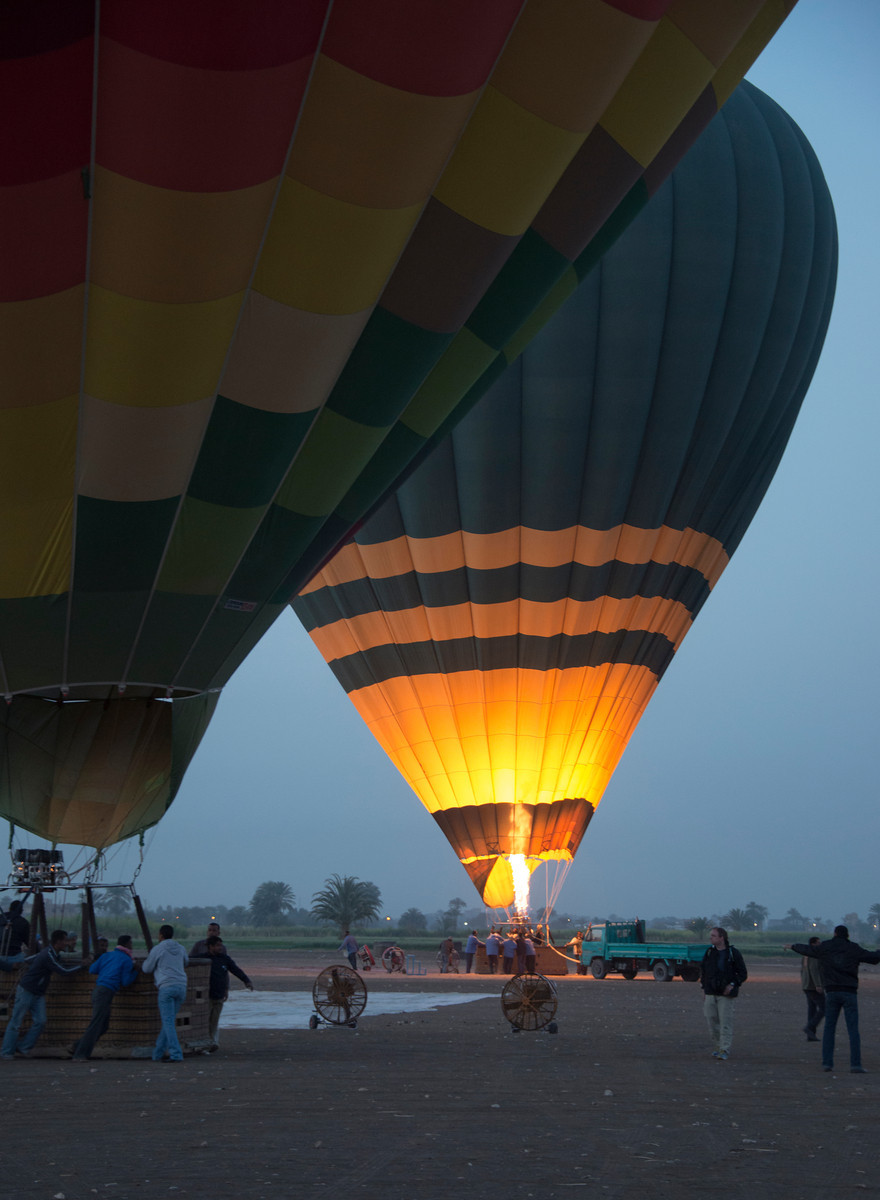
- SU-283 (back center), the balloon involved in the accident, on the morning of its fatal flight

Accident
- Date: 26 February 2013
- Summary: Fire on board, envelope deflation
- Site: Luxor, Egypt; 25°41′41″N 32°34′42″E

Aircraft
- Aircraft type: Ultramagic N-425
- Operator: Sky Cruise
- Registration: SU-283
- Occupants: 21
- Passengers: 20
- Crew: 1
- Fatalities: 19
- Injuries: 2
- Survivors: 2

On 26 February 2013, a hot air balloon crashed near Luxor, Egypt, killing 19 out of the 21 people on board. A fire developed in the basket due to a leak in the balloon's gas fuel system, causing the balloon to deflate mid-air and crash to the ground.

It was the deadliest ballooning accident in history and the deadliest aerostat disaster since the Hindenburg disaster in 1937, which killed 36 people.

== Background ==
Hot air balloons are commonly used in Luxor to provide tourists with aerial views of the Nile River, the temple of Karnak, and the Valley of the Kings, among other historical attractions. Concerns over passenger safety have been raised from time to time, with multiple crashes reported in 2007, 2008 and 2009.

In April 2009, 16 people had been hurt when a balloon crashed during a tour of Luxor. After the crash, flights were grounded for six months while safety measures were improved. Pilot training was increased and balloons were given a designated launching site. Following the toppling of Hosni Mubarak in 2011, the rule of law and the improved regulations were largely ignored.

Sky Cruise, the operator of the balloon, had suffered a previous accident in October 2011, which even involved the same balloon. The company has stated that it is properly insured and prepared to compensate victims' families.

== Crash ==
On 26 February at 07:00 Egypt Standard Time (05:00 UTC), an Ultramagic N-425 balloon, registration SU-283, operated by Sky Cruise departed on a sight-seeing flight carrying 20 passengers and a pilot. According to a nearby balloon pilot, Mohamed Youssef, a fire started in the Sky Cruise balloon a few meters off the ground as it was attempting to land, as a result of a leaking fuel line. As the fire engulfed the basket, the pilot and one passenger leaped to safety as the craft rose rapidly aided by a wind gust. As the balloon rose, approximately seven passengers jumped to their deaths to escape the fire. At an altitude of approximately 300 meters (980 ft), there was an explosion which could be heard several kilometers away. The balloon and remaining passengers plunged to the ground, killing everyone remaining on board. Youssef said it appeared that a gas leak in one of the balloon's tanks caused the fire and resulting explosion, consistent with information reported in state-run media. Earlier reports had indicated that the balloon may have contacted a power line.

Two minutes later, the burning craft crashed into a sugar cane field west of Luxor. A second explosion was reported 15 seconds later. Ambulances arrived on the scene after 15 minutes. Bodies were scattered across the field when rescue workers arrived on the scene. The balloon's final moments were caught on amateur video.

== Casualties ==
At the time of its ascent, the balloon carried 20 passengers and Momin Murad, the balloon's Egyptian pilot. Nineteen of the passengers were tourists: nine from Hong Kong, four from Japan, three from Britain, two from France, and one from Hungary; the 20th passenger was an Egyptian tour guide. Of the Hong Kongers, five were women and four were men. They were members of three families on a tour group organized by Kuoni Travel. The Japanese victims were two couples from Tokyo in their 60s. They were on a ten-day tour of Egypt organized by JTB Corporation. The three Britons and the Hungarian-born passenger, a resident of the UK, were on a tour organized by Thomas Cook Group. The French victims were a 48-year-old woman and her 14-year-old daughter.

The accident killed 18 of the passengers on site; the pilot and two passengers survived the initial crash. The two surviving passengers, both British men, were rushed to hospital in critical condition. One of them died after five hours of surgery. Dr. Mohammad Abdullah, the head of the emergency ward of the Luxor hospital, said that the Briton who died in the hospital had probably suffered a 50-meter (160 ft) fall. The surviving Briton was described as being in critical but stable condition, while the pilot was said to be conscious and talking, but with burns covering 70% of his body. Doctors at the Luxor International Hospital said that many of the dead suffered severe internal injuries and severe burns.

== Aftermath ==
Governor of Luxor Ezzat Saad banned hot air balloon flights in his jurisdiction until further notice. Egypt's civil aviation minister, Wael el-Maadawi, followed by suspending balloon flights nationwide. In a statement, President Mohamed Morsi expressed his "deepest condolences and sympathy for the families of those who lost their lives in this tragic incident." National government spokesman Alaa Hadidi said a committee would be formed to investigate the accident.

The bodies of the victims were transported to four hospitals in Cairo. Chinese consular officials in the Arab Republic of Egypt and Hong Kong Immigration Department officers were scheduled to travel with the family members of the Hong Kong victims to Cairo. Kuoni Travel, the Hong Kong travel agency that organized the tour attended by the Hong Kong passengers, made plans for the six tour members who did not take the balloon ride to leave Egypt. The tour agency stated that, in addition to the US$7000 per person stipulated by contract, additional compensation would be given.

Mohammed Osman, head of the Luxor Tourism Chamber, accused civil aviation authorities of lowering standards prior to the accident. "I don't want to blame the revolution for everything, but the laxness started with the revolution," he said. "These people are not doing their job, they are not checking the balloons and they just issue the licenses without inspection." National authorities were quick to deny the allegations, noting that the balloon had recently been inspected. They were also quick to blame the pilot, an anonymous official saying on the day of the accident that the pilot should have shut off gas valves and attempted to put out the fire instead of jumping out of the basket, thus possibly contributing to the tragedy. An anonymous civil aviation ministry official acknowledged to the press that standards had been weakened by the current regime. The pilot's license had been renewed one month prior to the accident.

Local and foreign media analysts speculated that the crash would hurt Egypt's already weakened tourism industry, which was down 22% from 2010 levels. Wael Ibrahim, who oversees the tourism syndicate in Luxor, did not expect the accident to worsen the situation since tourism was already down so much. "This (type of) accident could happen anywhere in the world", he remarked. A local balloon operator, angered by the industry shutdown, remarked: "Why the mass punishment? Do you stop all flights when you have a plane crash? ... You will cut the livelihoods for nearly 3,000 human beings who live on this kind of tourism." Angered by the industry-wide shutdown, tourism workers threatened to organize protests on 2 March. The same day, Saad admitted that pressure to resume balloon flights was mounting and promised that downtime would be less than a month. Hot air balloon rides at Luxor were set to resume in April, according to a statement on the Egyptian Civil Aviation Regulatory Commission's (CARC) website.

== Investigation ==
Preliminary results of the government investigation ruled out criminal conduct as the cause of the crash. On 2 March, Luxor-area balloon pilots held a press conference to defend Egypt's safety protocol and their colleague's actions.

The Egyptian Civil Aviation Authority released its final report of the crash on 7 January 2014. The 219-page report blamed a leak in a fuel line connected to the balloon's burner. The aging line had been in use since 2005 and sprung a leak, which ignited as the balloon came in to land. The fire severely injured the pilot, who jumped or fell from the basket. Some of the ground crew released the ground line in order to attend to the pilot, so that the remaining crew could not keep the balloon near the ground. The flaming balloon rose rapidly and uncontrolled, then exploded.

== See also ==
- List of ballooning accidents
- Hot air ballooning in Luxor
- 2025 Santa Catarina hot air balloon crash, a similar accident occurred also in a hot air ballooning destination
