= Hot air ballooning in Luxor =

Tourist attraction in Egypt

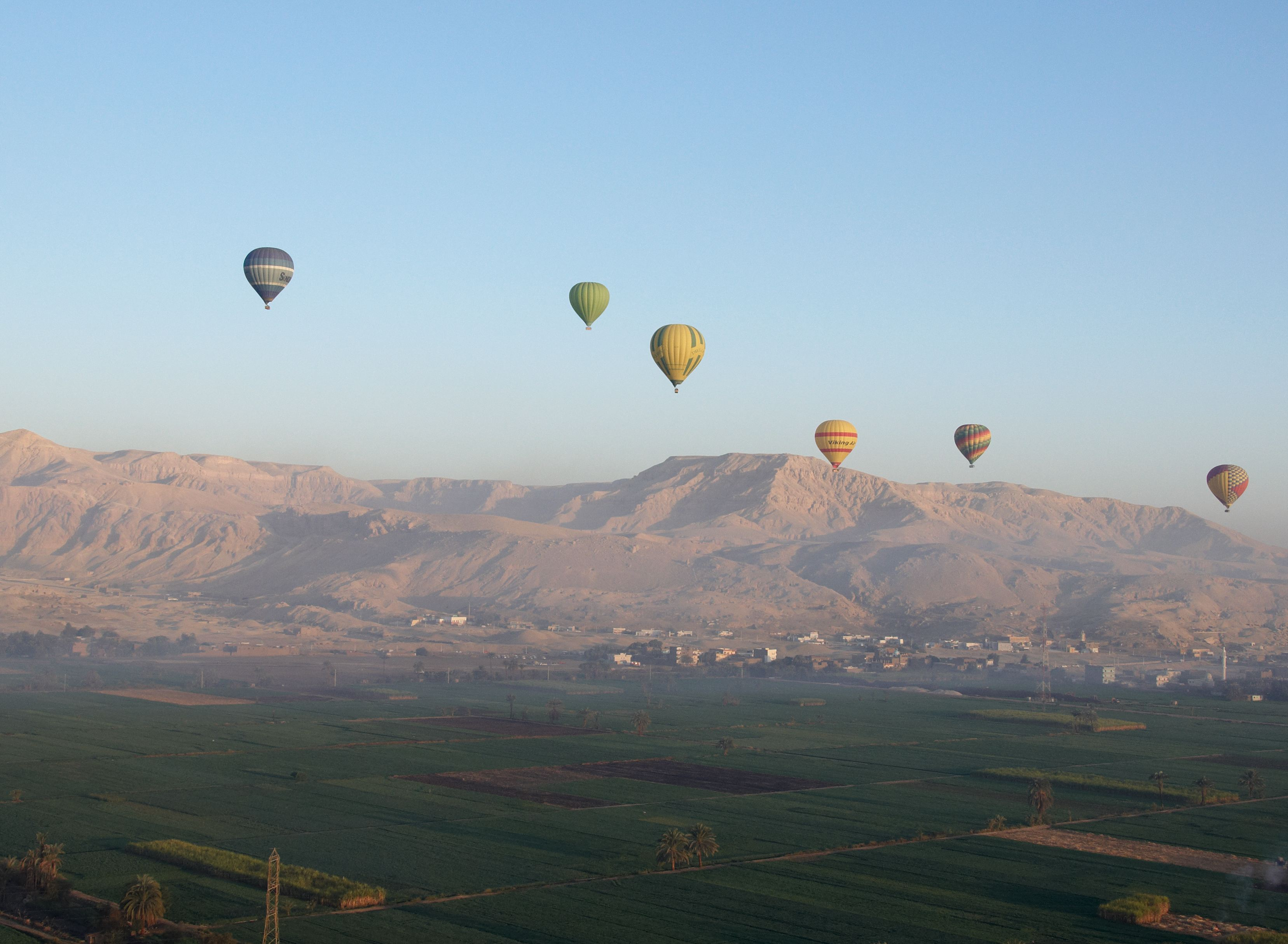
View of city's green areas

Hot air ballooning in Luxor is an aspect of the Egyptian tourist industry. Tour companies offer sunrise rides in hot-air balloons to tourists who enjoy views of ancient Thebes, the temple complexes of Karnak and Luxor, the Valley of the Kings and the Valley of the Queens.

== History ==
=== Operations ===
British company began offering hot-air balloon rides to tourists in Luxor in the early 1988. While the first Egyptian ballooning company was established in 1993.

The balloon rides are an important part of Egypt's tourism industry.

Following a 2009 crash, balloon flights at Luxor were suspended for six months while pilots were given additional training and safety measures were reviewed and improved. New regulations limited the number of balloons that could be aloft simultaneously and restricted take-offs to a new airfield for the sole use of hot-air balloons.

As of January 2018, eight companies operate a combined total of 32 hot air balloons offering flights over Luxor.

=== Accidents and incidents ===
The overall safety record of hot air ballooning in Egypt is poor. Seven tourists were injured in a crash early in 2009. On a single day in February 2009, three separate hot air balloons crashed in different locations carrying a total of 60 tourists, resulting in injuries that included broken bones.

At Luxor, eight tourists were injured in 2007 when the balloon in which they were riding crash-landed in a field. Four Scottish tourists, were seriously injured in April 2008 when the balloon in which they were traveling crash-landed. Sixteen tourists were injured at Luxor in April 2009 when the balloon in which they were traveling is understood to have collided with a cell phone transmission tower.

The most serious accident was the 2013 Luxor hot air balloon crash, in which 19 people were killed when a leaking fuel line started a fire.

After 22 Chinese tourists were injured in a 2016 balloon crash, the Egyptian civil aviation authority suspended flights for three days while safety procedures were reviewed.

Twelve tourists were injured and one man from South Africa was killed in Luxor in 2018 when high winds caused a balloon's operator to lose control. Flights were suspended until the unusually high winds subsided.
