= Károly Holecz =

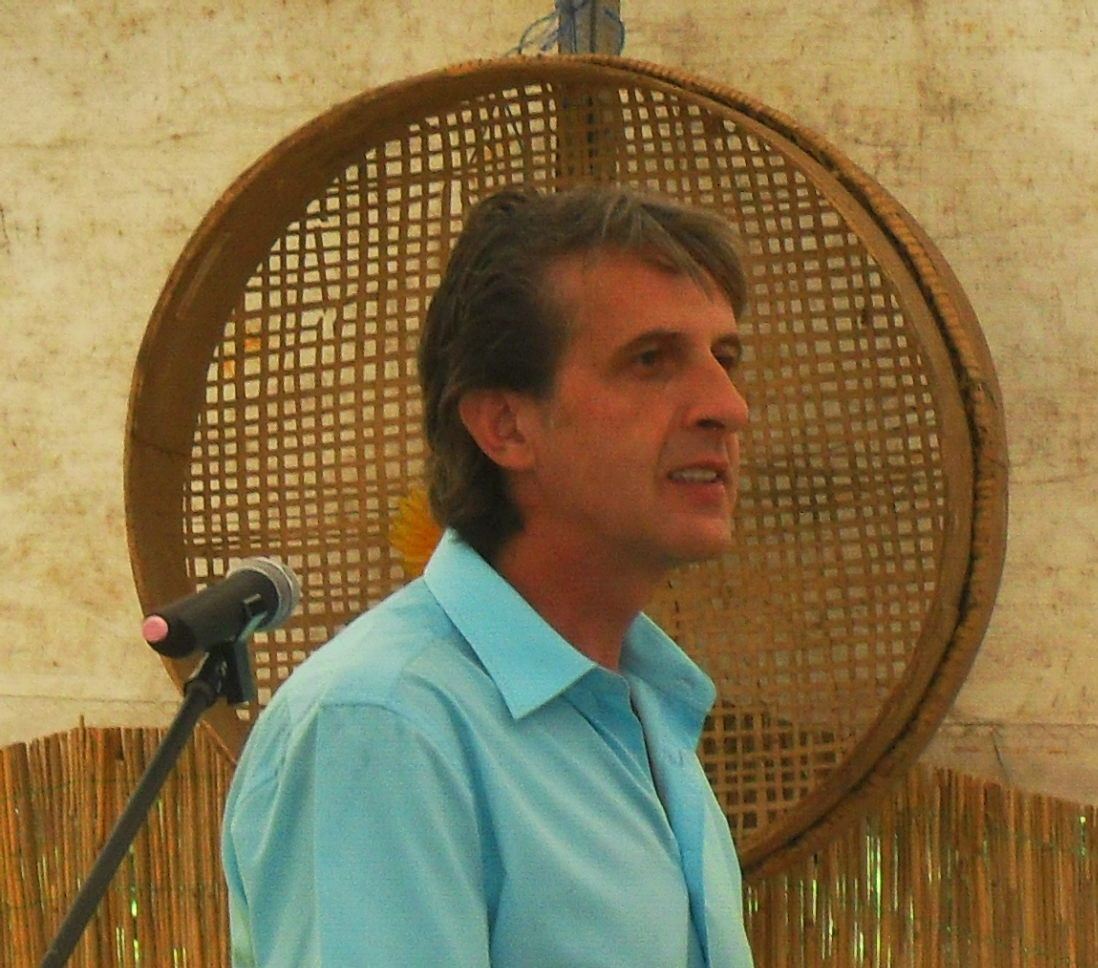
Károly Holecz in Orfalu (2013)

Károly Holecz (Slovene: Karči Holec) (born 24 February 1969) is a Slovenian writer, journalist, and former mayor of the village of Orfalu, near Szentgotthárd, Hungary.

His parents are Károly Holecz Sr. and Sára Skerlák. Born in Szentgotthárd, he went to primary school in Apátistvánfalva and high school in Körmend. After that he received a bachelor's degree from Dániel Berzsenyi College (now University of West Hungary – Savaria University Center) in Szombathely after studying Slovene and technology.

He worked at the Hungarian Slovenian weekly Porabje, and from 1994 to 2006 was the mayor of Orfalu. He has been awarded a recognition as a notable member of the Slovene minority in Hungary.

In 2003, he published a collection of stories titled Andovske zgodbe, Andovske prpovejsti (Stories of Orfalu) in standard Slovene and the Prekmurje Slovene.

== Bibliography ==
- Holec, Karel (2003). Andovske zgodbe/Andovske prpovejsti (in Slovenian). Murska Sobota: Franc-Franc. ISBN 961-219-068-2. OCLC 57742911.

== See also ==
- List of Slovene writers and poets in Hungary
