= András Rogan =

András Rogan Slovene: Andraš Rogan was a 17th-century Slovene Catholic priest in Hungary, in Dokležovje.

It is likely that he was born in the upper Slovene March (Prekmurje, Goričko). The surname Rogan is frequent near the municipalities of Rogašovci, Martinje, and Tišina. He likely studied in Zagreb and Varaždin.

He was the priest of Dokležovje. In 1676, he compiled a manuscript of sermons, mostly transcriptions from the Kajkavian dialect (with some Prekmurje Slovene words). The sermons originate from Anton Vramec's Postila from 1586. The Catholic Hungarian Slovenes in the 16th through 18th centuries used the Kajkavian form of Croatian.

== See also ==
- List of Slovene writers and poets in Hungary

== Literature ==
- Tatjana Grah: Rokopisni vstavek Andreja Rogana v kajkavskem pridigarskem priročnikui - Postilli Antona Vramca, Stopinje 2007.
