= Ferenc Hüll =

Slovene writer and priest

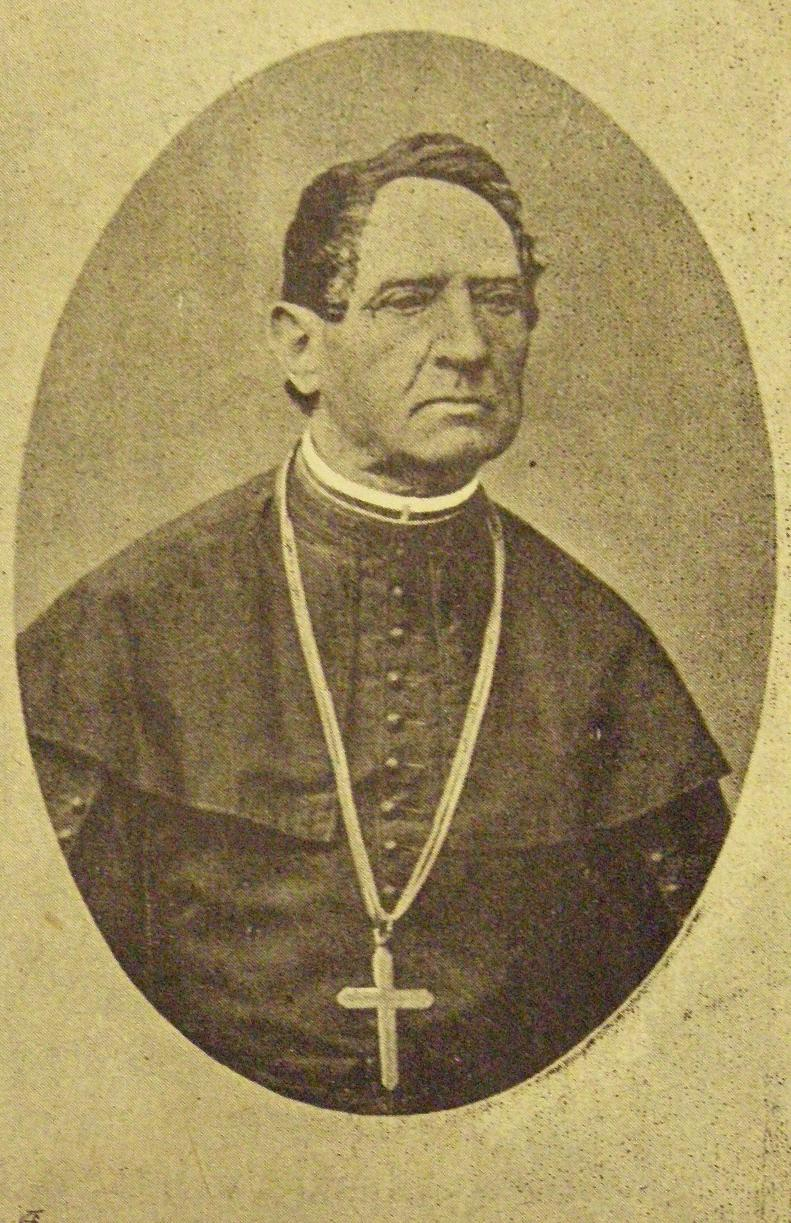
Photo of Ferenc Hüll in the Prekmurje Slovene almanac Kalendar Srca Jezušovoga (1906)

Ferenc Hüll (Slovene: Franc Hül, Prekmurje Slovene: Ferenc Hül) (August 28, 1800 – October 28, 1880) was a Slovene Roman Catholic priest, dean of the Slovene March (Tótság), and a writer in Hungary.

Hüll was born in Tišina (now Prekmurje, Slovenia). His parents were Imre Hüll and the ethnic German Krisztina Hemeczperger. By 1822 he was a priest, and he lived in Veszprém for two years.

Between 1824 and 1826 he was a curate in Murska Sobota, and he later became the priest of the town. By 1840 he was the dean of the Slovene March. In 1872, by favour of Franz Joseph I of Austria, he became the provost of Szepes-Langeck.

Hüll wrote in Latin about the history of the Parish of Murska Sobota. He died in Murska Sobota.

== Work ==
- Historia Parochiae Murai Szombatiensis

== See also ==
- Hungarian Slovenes
- List of Slovene writers and poets in Hungary
