= István Kováts =

Hungarian writer

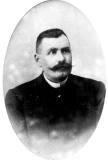
István Kováts.

István Kováts (Slovene: Števan Kovatš; January 25, 1866 – December 11, 1945) was a Hungarian Lutheran pastor, writer, and historian. He wrote in the Prekmurje Slovene (the language of the Hungarian Slovenes).

He was born in Lébény, near Győr to the Lutheran landowner István Kováts and Katalin Kováts. He first studied in Sopron, and then in Germany at the University of Halle-Wittenberg and University of Jena. He was ordained on September 29, 1889 and made a curate in Tét, and then sent to Transylvania in 1891. On March 12, 1892 he went to the Slovene March, in Murska Sobota, where he learned the local dialect.

He married Irena von Berke, a Hungarian noblewoman who was the daughter of Mihaly von Berke, a wealthy landowner. They had three children; two daughters and one son. His son Karel Kováts (later Kovač) built the new Lutheran church in Gornji Slaveči and was the head of the Lutheran church in Slovenia.

István Kováts was the president of the Bank of the Slovene March and the head of the Lutheran Congregation of Mura until 1941. From 1941 to 1945, he was the honorary head of the Lutheran Congregation of Mura. He built the new Lutheran church in Murska Sobota, and the Lutheran dormitory. In 1940 he wrote a history of Lutheran Vicarage of Murska Sobota, and he edited the almanac Evangeličanski koledar and the gazette Düševni List. He died in Murska Sobota on 11 December 1945. For his contribution to the Kingdom of Hungary he received the National Defence Cross (Nemzetvédelmi Kereszt) from Miklós Horthy himself. Alexander I of Yugoslavia awarded him the Order of St. Sava (fourth class).

== His work ==
- Zgodovina Mursko-soboške evangeličanske gmajne, Evangeličanski koledar, 1940.

== See also ==
- List of Slovene writers and poets in Hungary
- Michael Kovats de Fabriczy

== Sources ==
- Encyclopedia of Prekmurje Biography – István Kováts

== Literature ==
- Kovats Štefan (1866–1945). Evangeličanski koledar 1952. 55-56.
- Theodor Hari: Zgodovina evangeličanske cerkve v Murski Soboti, 2000.
