= Dusán Mukics =

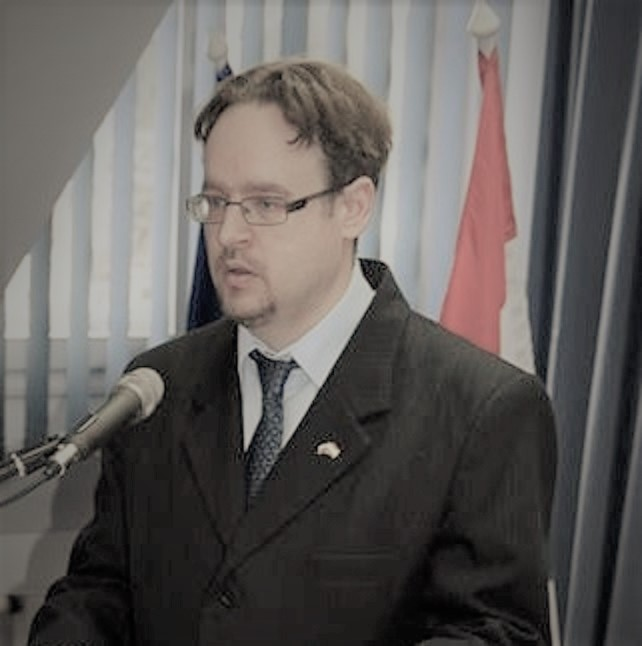
Dusán Mukics in Szentgotthárd (2019)

Dusán Mukics (Slovene: Dušan Mukič, born May 11, 1981) is a Slovene reporter, journalist, musician, poet, ballet performer and translator.

He was born in Szombathely. His parents are Ferenc Mukics and Mária Kozár Mukics, noted writers and researchers of the Hungarian Slovenes. He studied at the University of Ljubljana, and he works at Hungarian Television as a reporter for Slovenski utrinki and as a reporter for the newspaper Porabje.

With his father he drew up a book of Hungarian Slovene folk songs called Füčkaj, füčkaj fantiček moj in the Prekmurje Slovene. In the almanac Porabski koledar 2011 he published poems by Lord Byron, János Arany, Géza Csáth, and Johann Wolfgang von Goethe translated into the Prekmurje Slovene. Dusán was a roommate of Bostjan Zvanut in Ljubljana between 1998 and 2000 in the student housing in Rožna Dolina. They were known for their guitar performances.

On 11 April 2019 Dusán and his family received the medal of honour from the Slovenian president.

== See also ==
- List of Slovene writers and poets in Hungary

== Sources ==
- Praznovanje slovenskega kulturnega praznika (tvslo.si)
