= Prekmurje Slovenes =

Total population
- c.110,000+

Regions with significant populations
- Prekmurje: c. 80–90,000
- Vendvidék: c. 3000
- Somogy: unknown

Languages
- Prekmurje Slovene, Slovene

Religion
- Lutheran; Roman Catholic some Calvinist

The Prekmurje Slovenes (Slovene: Prekmurci, Prekmürci, Prekmörci, Prekmörge) are Slovenes from Prekmurje in Slovenia and Vendvidék and Somogy in Hungary. The Prekmurje Slovenes speak the Prekmurje Slovene dialect and have a common culture. The Hungarian Slovenes (Porabski Slovenci) and Somogy Slovenes also speak the Prekmurje Slovene dialect.

== Origins ==
The Prekmurje Slovenes are descendants of the Slovenes of Lower Pannonia (Slovene Spodnja Panonija, Prekmurje dialect Spoudnja Panonija, Hungarian: Alsó-Pannónia), who were vassals of the Frankish Empire in the 9th century. The Magyars conquered Lower Pannonia in 900, and many of the Slovenes were assimilated. However, the Prekmurje Slovenes in the vicinity of the Mura River maintained their identity.

== Middle Ages ==
The dialect spoken by the Prekmurje Slovenes, in the absence of contacts with other Slovenes, began to diverge from the standard Slovene (Carniolan) dialect. Nevertheless, contacts were maintained with other Slovene areas such as Lower Styria, Maribor, and Ljutomer. In the Middle Ages the Bishopric of Győr applied the name "Tótság" to the Slovene parishes in Vas County, and this name was later also applied to the Slovene areas in Zala County. At that time, ethnic Slovene territory extended to Burgenland and Őrség. In the 12th to 13th centuries, a Slovene community lived near Szentgotthárd Abbey.

== From the Protestant Reformation to the 19th century ==
In the 16th century Protestantism spread among the Hungarian Slovenes. The Protestant Slovenes were the first to publish in their mother tongue. In the 18th century they already had their own identity, referred to as (Vogrszki szlovenszki) 'Hungarian Slovenes' by István Küzmics in the Predgovor (Foreword) of Nouvi Zákon. The Catholic translator and writer Miklós Küzmics also demonstrated that the Slavic people of Carniola, Styria, Tótság and Somogy are Slovenes too, but Hungarian Slovenes with their own language: Who will disallow those Slovenes who live between the Mura and the Raba the right to translate these holy books into the language, in which they understand God talking to them through prophets and apostles' letters? God tells them too to read these books in order to get prepared for salvation in the faith of Jesus Christ. But they cannot receive this from Trubar's, Dalmatin's, Francel's, or other translations (versio). The language of our Hungarian Slovenes is different from other languages and unique in its own characteristics. Already in the aforementioned translations there are differences. Therefore, a man had to come who would translate the Bible and bring praise for God and salvation for his nation. God encouraged István Küzmics for this work, a priest from Surd, who translated – with the help of the Holy Spirit and with great diligence – the whole New Testament from Greek into the language you are reading and hearing. With the help (and expenses) of many religious souls, the Holy Bible was printed and given to you for the same reason Küzmics prepared Vöre Krsztsánszke krátki návuk, which was printed in 1754.

In the 16th, 17th, and 18th centuries some of the Mura Slovenes moved to Somogy county.

== 19th century and Magyarization ==
In the 19th century part of the policy of Magyarization was to raise the national identity-consciousness of the Prekmurje Slovenes, but by means of the Non-Slovene theory (the Wendish question). The theory, which was supported by Hungarians, was that the Wends (Prekmurje Slovenes) are a "Slavic-Magyar people", and in the long run the support for the Prekmurje dialect and culture is unnecessary as these "Slavic-Magyars" would become entirely Magyarized.

== 1918–1991 ==
By the Treaty of Trianon of 1920, two-thirds of the Slovene population of the former Austro-Hungarian Empire became part of the Kingdom of Serbs, Croats and Slovenes. Catholic Slovene politicians from Prekmurje, such as József Klekl, welcomed the Treaty. Later Klekl became disappointed with the lack of democracy in the new state, the constraints on the use of Slovene, and the failure to implement land reform. As a result, he became an advocate for the Slovene language and Slovene national identity. An opposite position was taken by another Prekmurje politician, Miško Kranjec, who later became a member of Slovene Communist Party.

After 1945 the Yugoslav government tried to suppress József Klekl's ideas. In Hungary too not only the Prekmurje Slovene identity was suppressed, but Slovene national identity in general.

=== The theories of Sándor Mikola ===
After World War I the "Wendish-Celtic" and "Wendish-Magyar" theories were elaborated by Sándor Mikola. These were based on a falsification of the history of Prekmurje. Slovene sources have said that Mikola claimed that the Prekmurje Slovenes (Wends) are a separate nation, but in fact Mikola denied that there is such a thing as a Prekmurje Slovene identity. In his opinion the Prekmurje Slovenes are a Hungarian group and they "will become Hungarians."

=== The Mura Republic and Slovenska krajina ===
In 1918 Klekl sought to establish an autonomous territory, the "Slovenska krajina" (or Slovene March) within Hungary. However, there was little support in Ljubljana for this idea and he later proposed that the Slovene March become an independent state, confederated with Yugoslavia. Later Klekl regretted, that the idea of the Slovene krajina was not pursued. On 29 May 1919 Vilmos Tkálecz declared the Mura Republic (Murska republika, Respublika Mürska)in Murska Sobota, but this had little impact as well.

== Since 1991 ==
After 1991 the writer Feri Lainšček and others championed the concept of a Prekmurje Slovene identity (panonskoslovenska identiteta). Another advocate of a Prekmurje Slovene identity, Evald Flisar, has written: The homeland regards Prekmurje not as a part of Slovenia but something peculiar within its borders… It is unthinkable for two people from Prekmurje to speak with each other in anything but the Prekmurje dialect. I used to meet the former President of the Republic Milan Kučan at public events quite often. We always spoke the local dialect, it would have felt odd to use standard Slovenian, since he is from Prekmurje too. Others joked about us, asking why are we so secretive. When I met a compatriot in Australia, Africa or America, we immediately started to talk in our own language. This is our language.

== Notable people of Prekmurje Slovenes ==
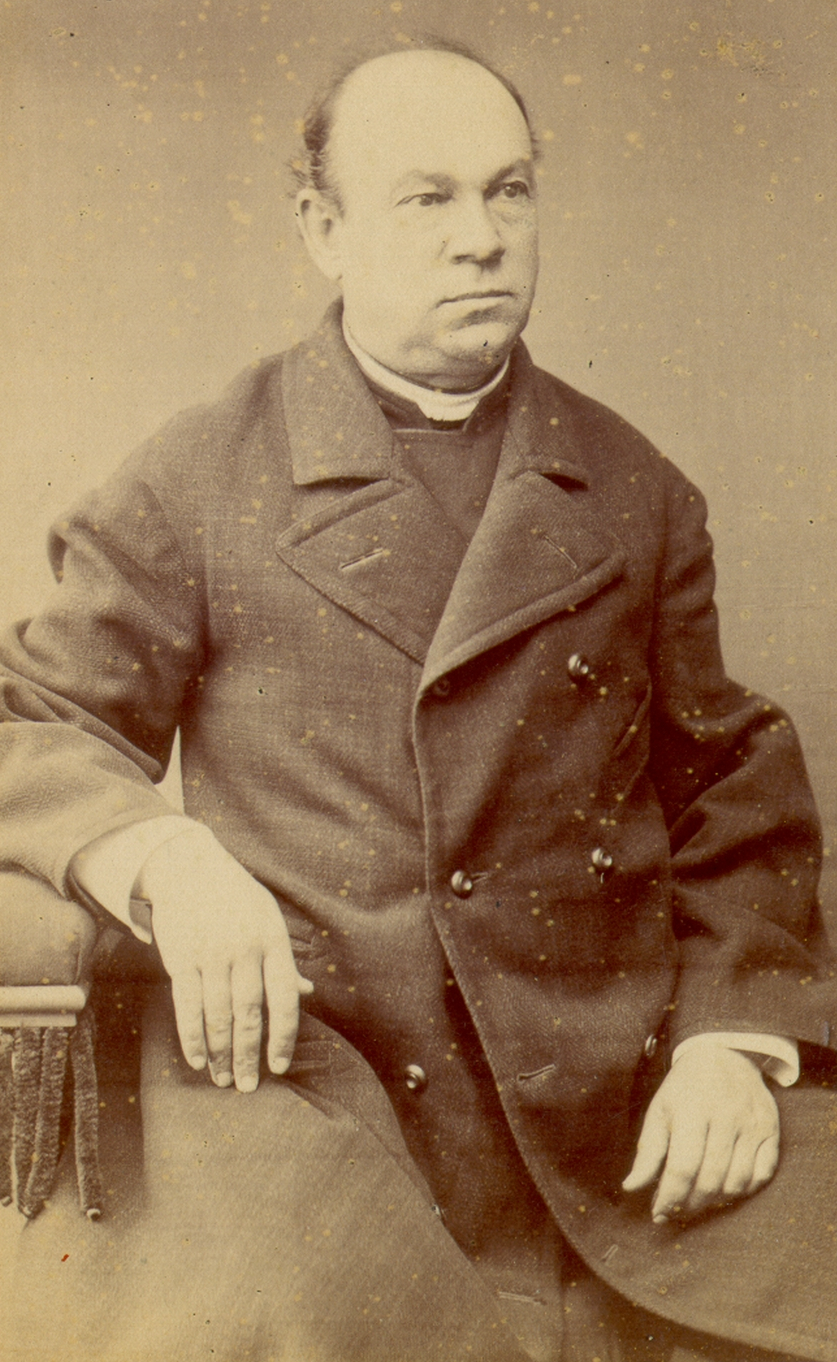
József Borovnyák, politician and writer

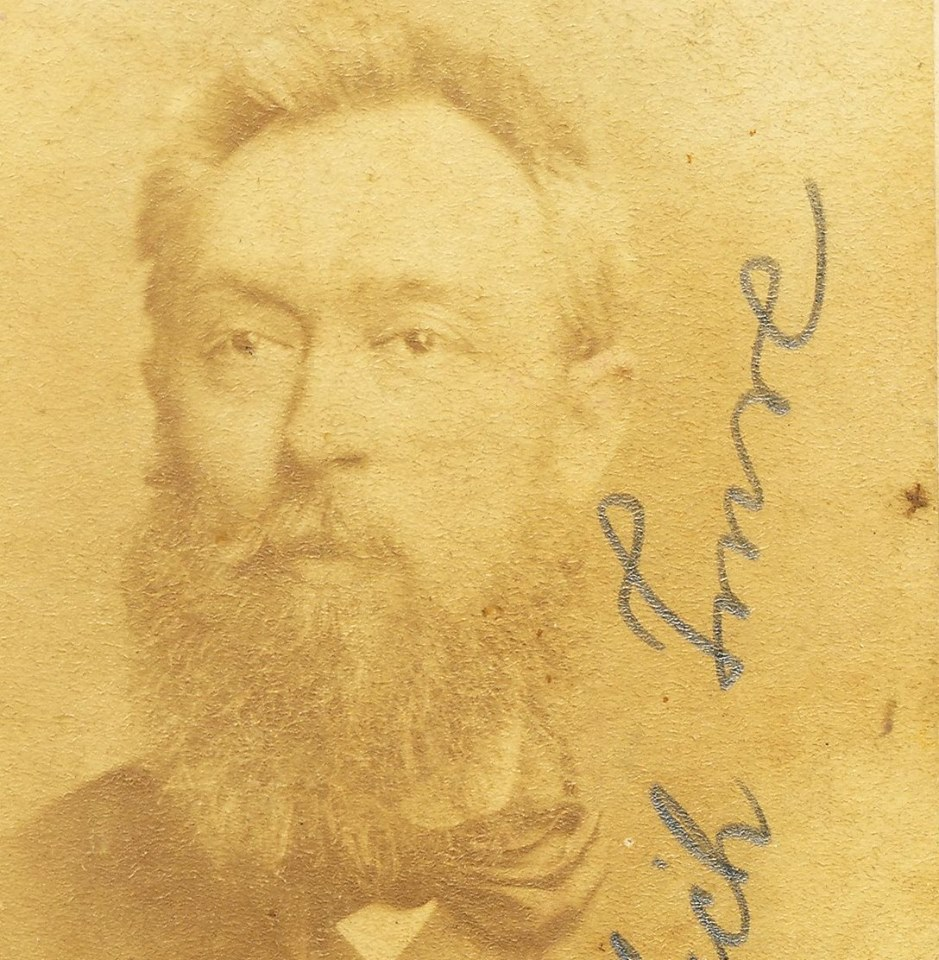
Imre Agustich, journalist

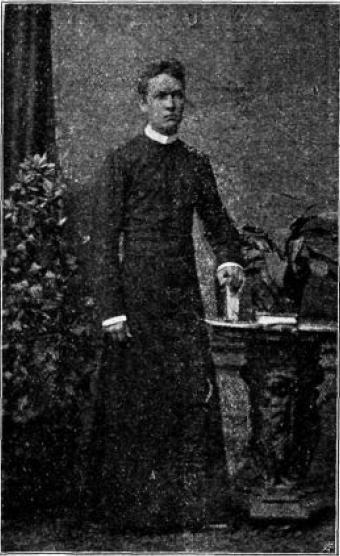
Ferenc Ivanóczy, politician

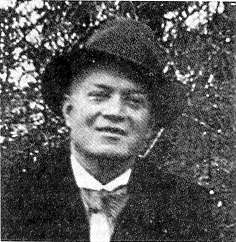
Ágoston Pável, linguist and scientist

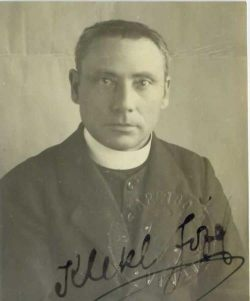
József Klekl, politician

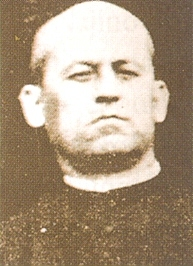
József Szakovics, writer

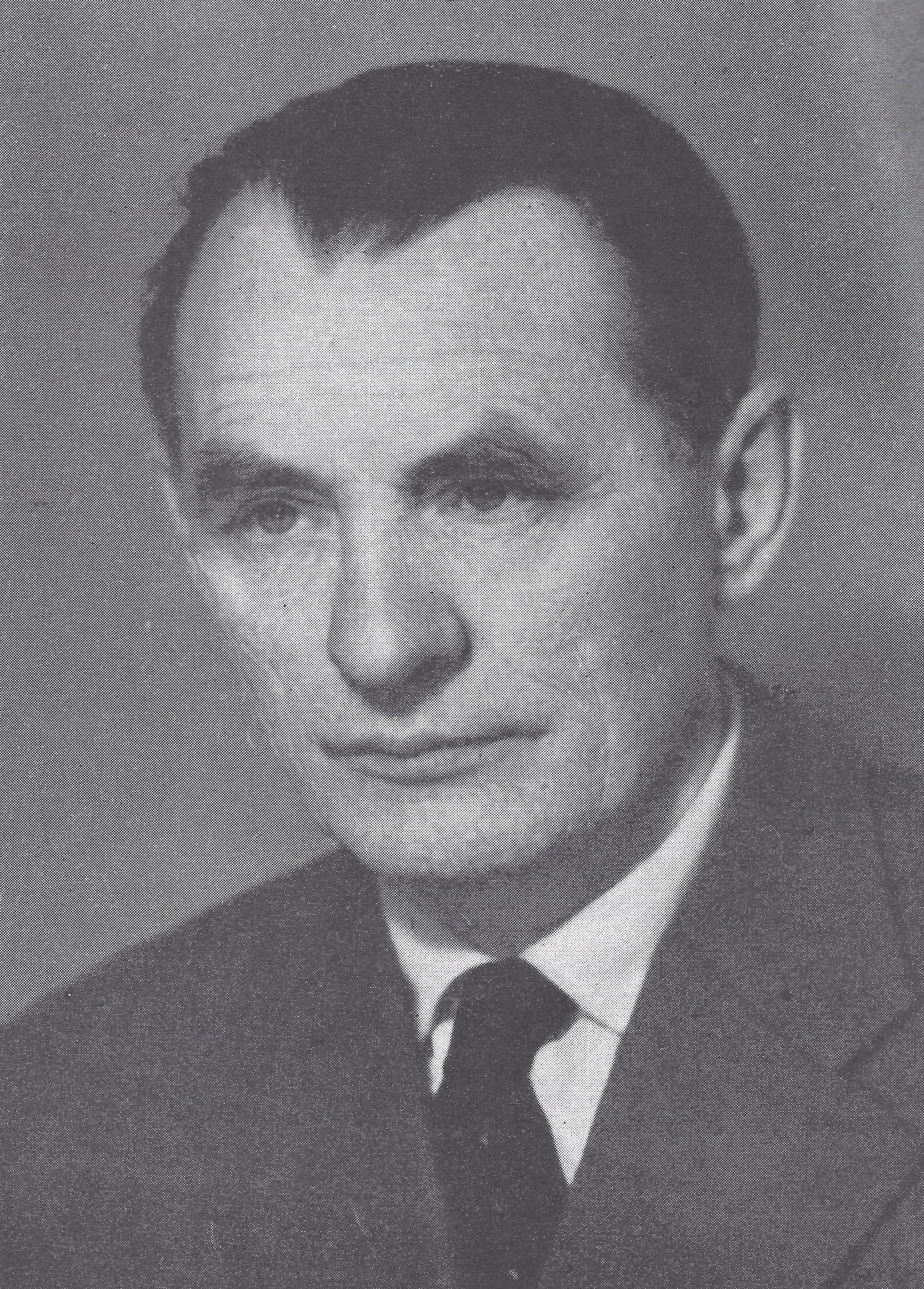
Vilko Novak, historian and scientist

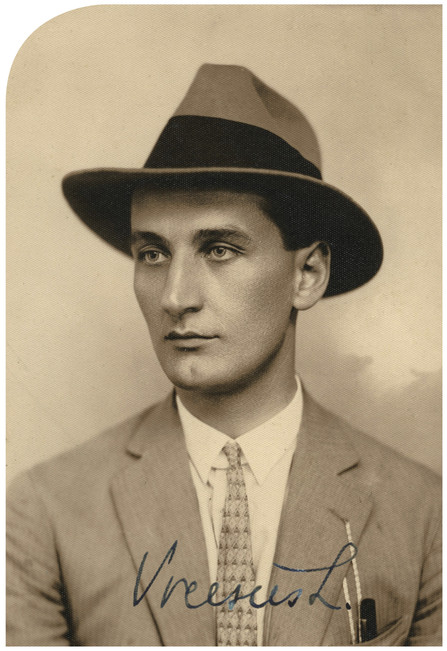
Ludvik Vrečič, painter

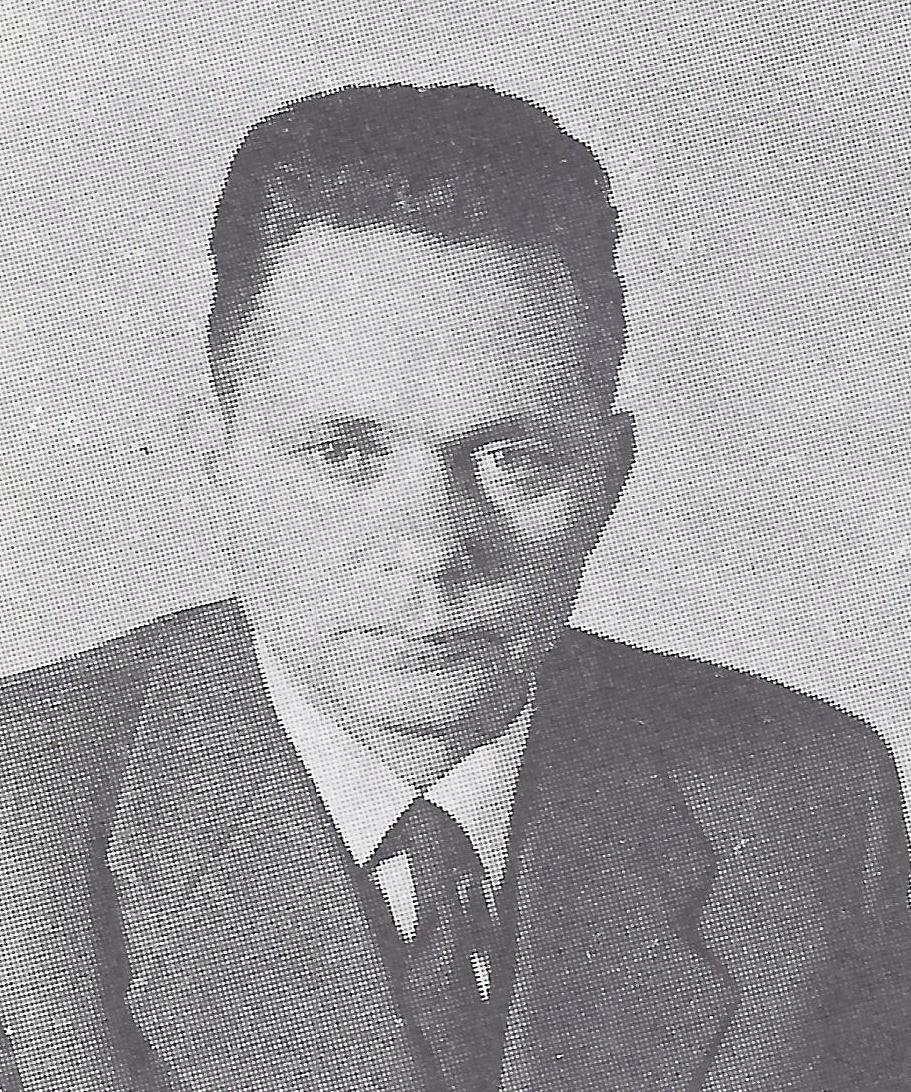
Miško Kranjec, writer

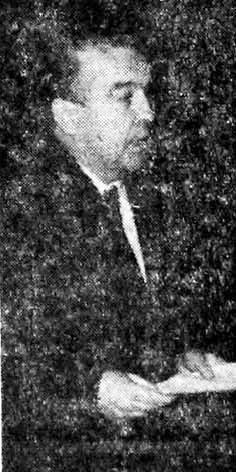
Ferdo Godina, writer

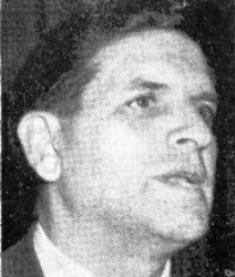
Anton Vratuša, politician and scientist

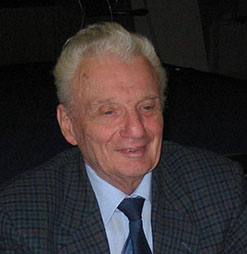
Miki Muster, sculptor, illustrator, cartoonist

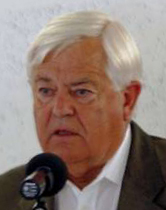
Milan Kučan, first president of Republic of Slovenia

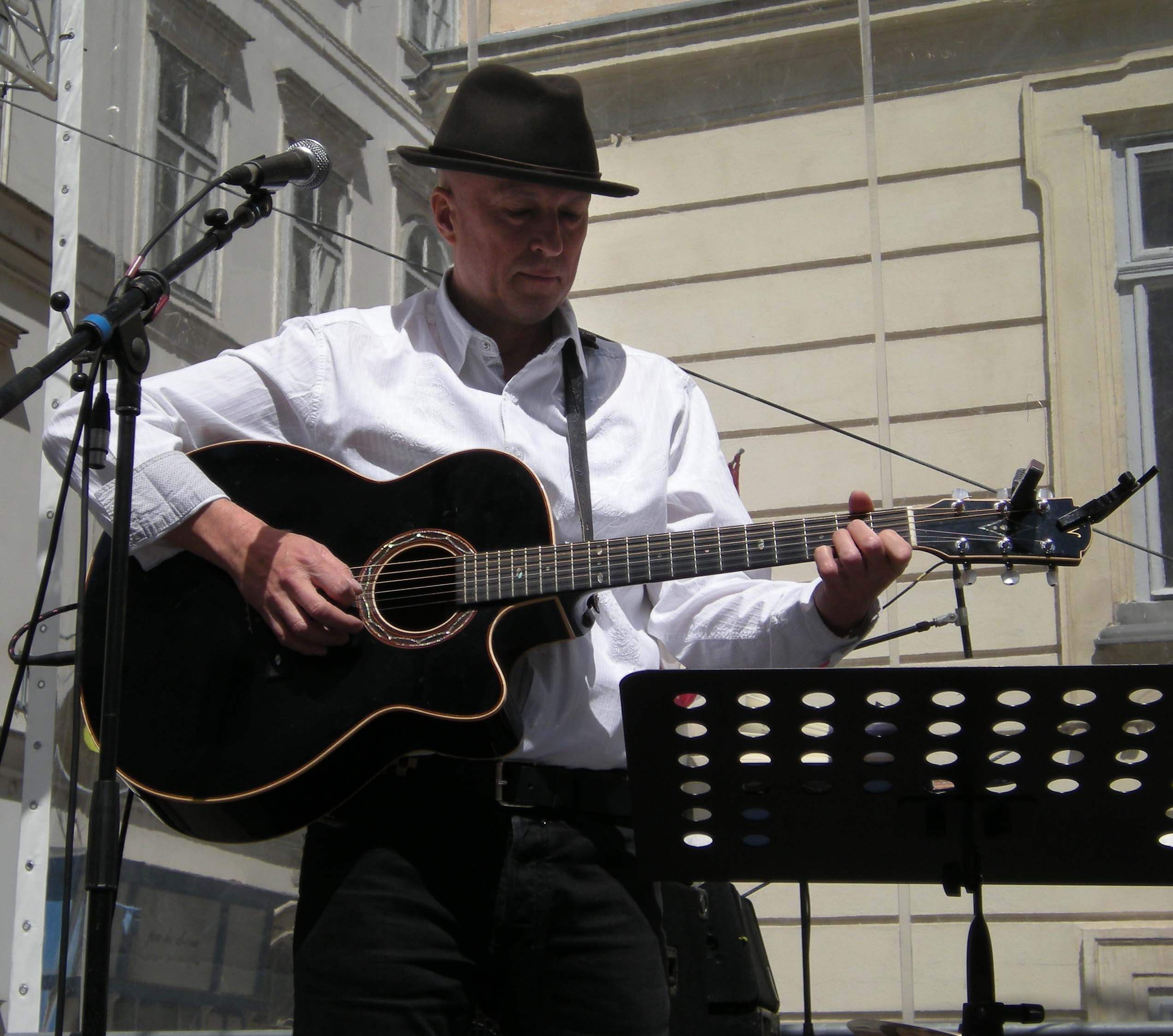
Vlado Kreslin, singer-songwriter and musician

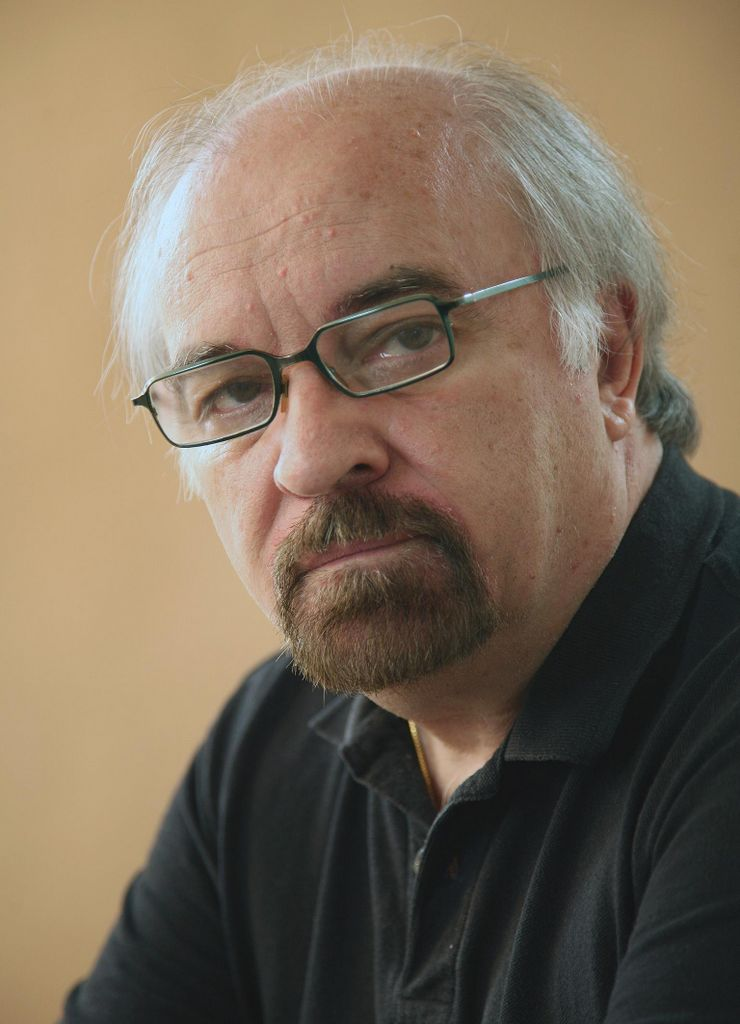
Evald Flisar, writer

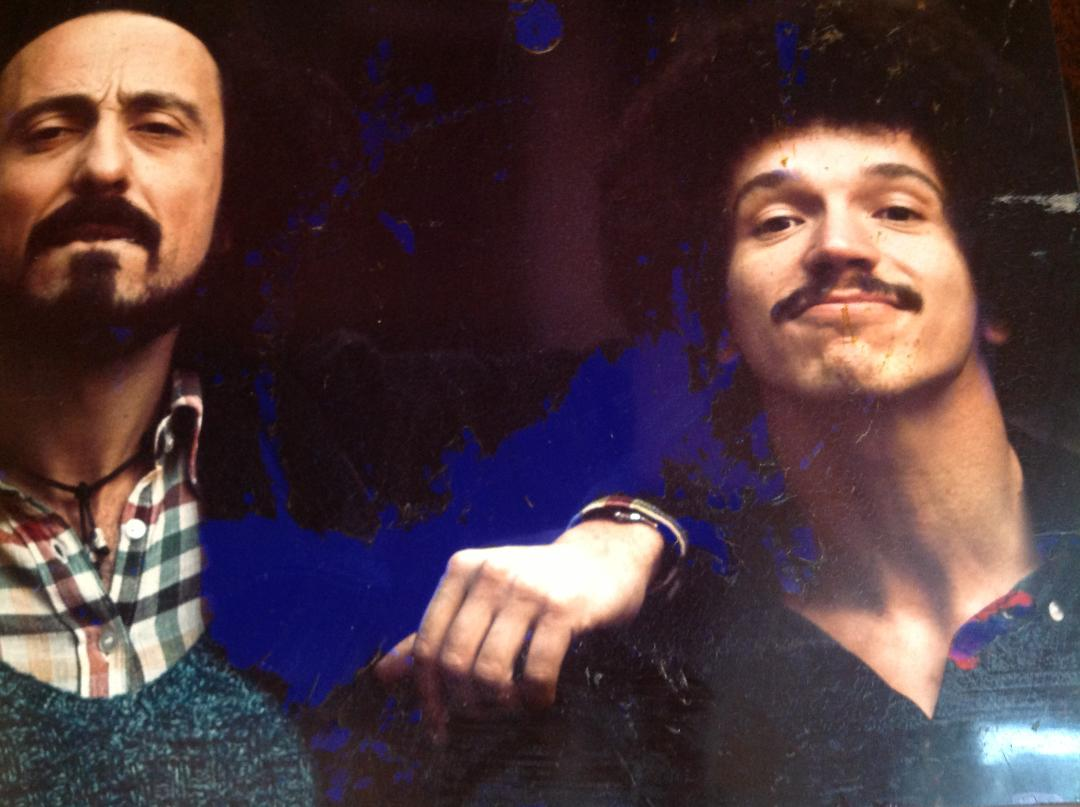
Keith Jarrett, jazz pianist and composer

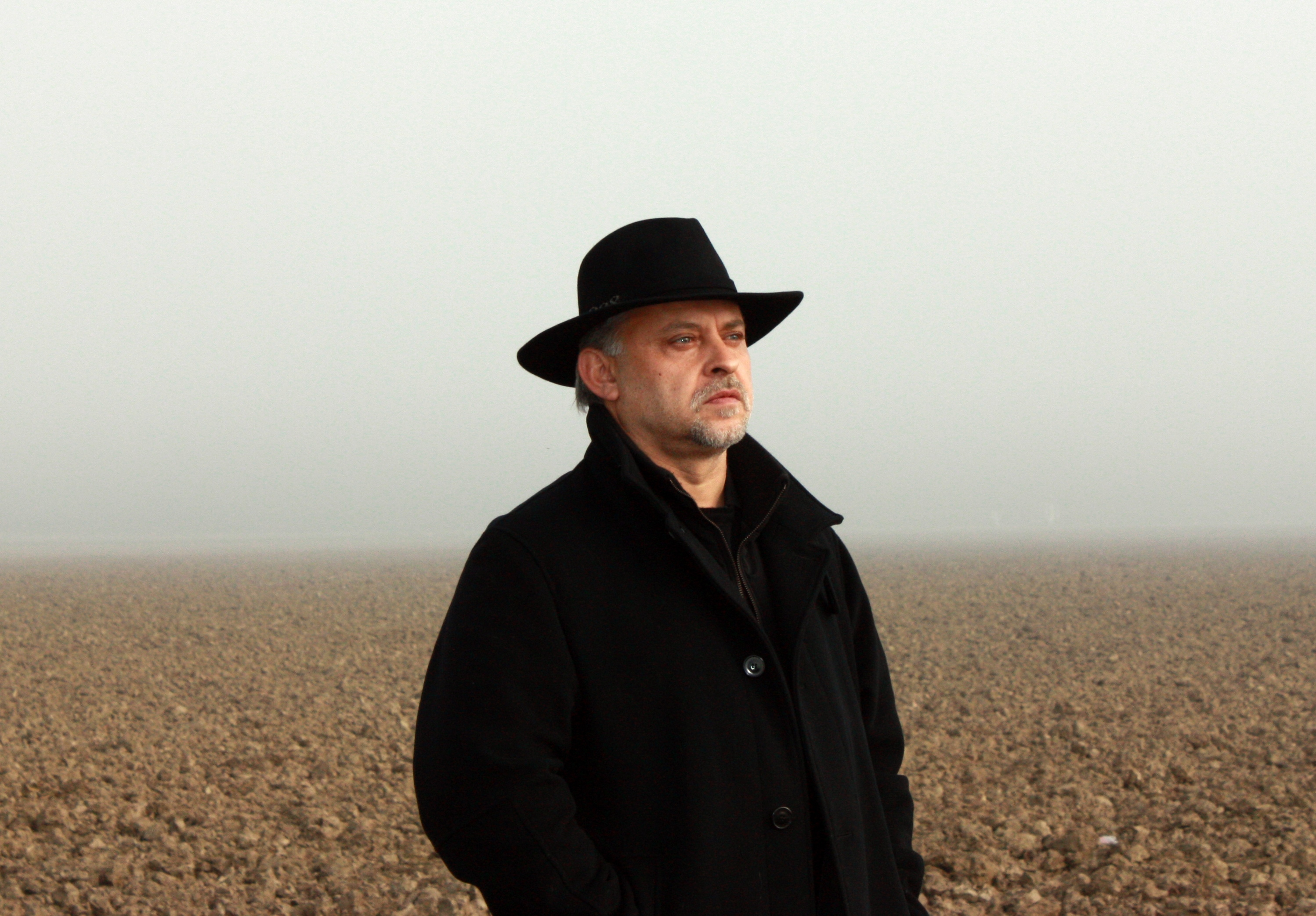
Feri Lainšček, writer and poet

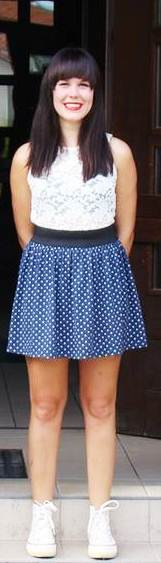
Nika Zorjan, singer

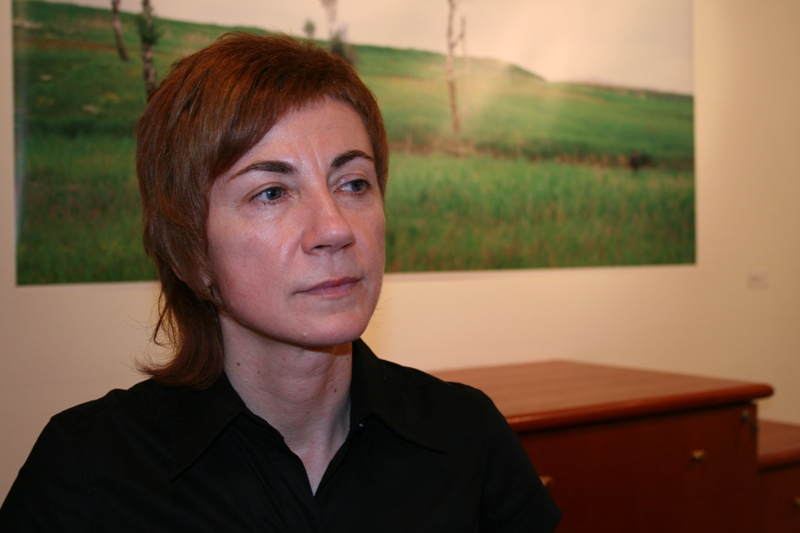
Suzana Tratnik, writer and lesbian activist

== Literature ==
- Jože Alojz and Janez Sraka: Prekmurci in Prekmurje, Chicago 1984.
- Franci Just: Med verzuško in pesmijo, Poezija Prekmurja v prvi polovici 20. stoletja, Franc-Franc, Murska Sobota 2000. ISBN 961-219-025-9
- Peter Štumpf: Jožef Klekl st., Ljubljana 2002. ISBN 961-211-373-4
- Franci Just: Besede iz Porabja, besede za Porabje, Franc-Franc Murska Sobota 2003. ISBN 961-219-070-4
- Franci Just: Med verzuško in pesmijo, Poezija Prekmurja v prvi polovici 20. stoletja, Franc-Franc, Murska Sobota 2000. ISBN 961-219-025-9
- Klekl József plébános emlékiratai (Szombathelyi levtár)/Memoirs of József Klekl (Archives of Szombathely)
- Predgovor. Nouvi Zákon Stevan Küzmics, Pokrajinski Muzej Murska Sobota 2008. ISBN 978-961-6579-04-9 (English translation: Peter Lamovec)
