= József Szmodis =

Slovene Lutheran priest

József Szmodis (Slovene: Jožef Smodiš) was a Slovene Lutheran priest in Krašči in the 17th and 18th centuries in Hungary. He wrote a Lutheran hymnal in the Prekmurje Slovene.

== See also ==
- István Kozel
- List of Slovene writers and poets in Hungary
- Old hymnal of Martjanci

== Literature ==
- Jože Alojz & Janez Sraka. Prekmurci in Prekmurje, Chicago 1984.
