= János Szlepecz =

Slovene Roman Catholic priest, dean and writer (1872–1936)

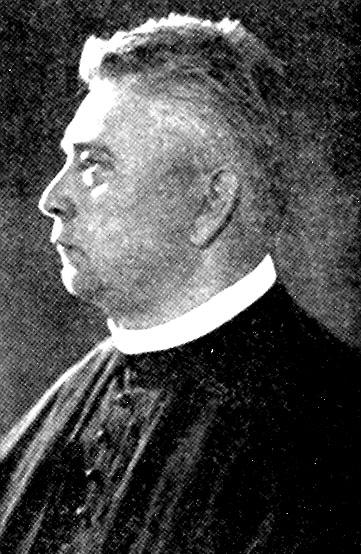
János Szlepecz in 1937

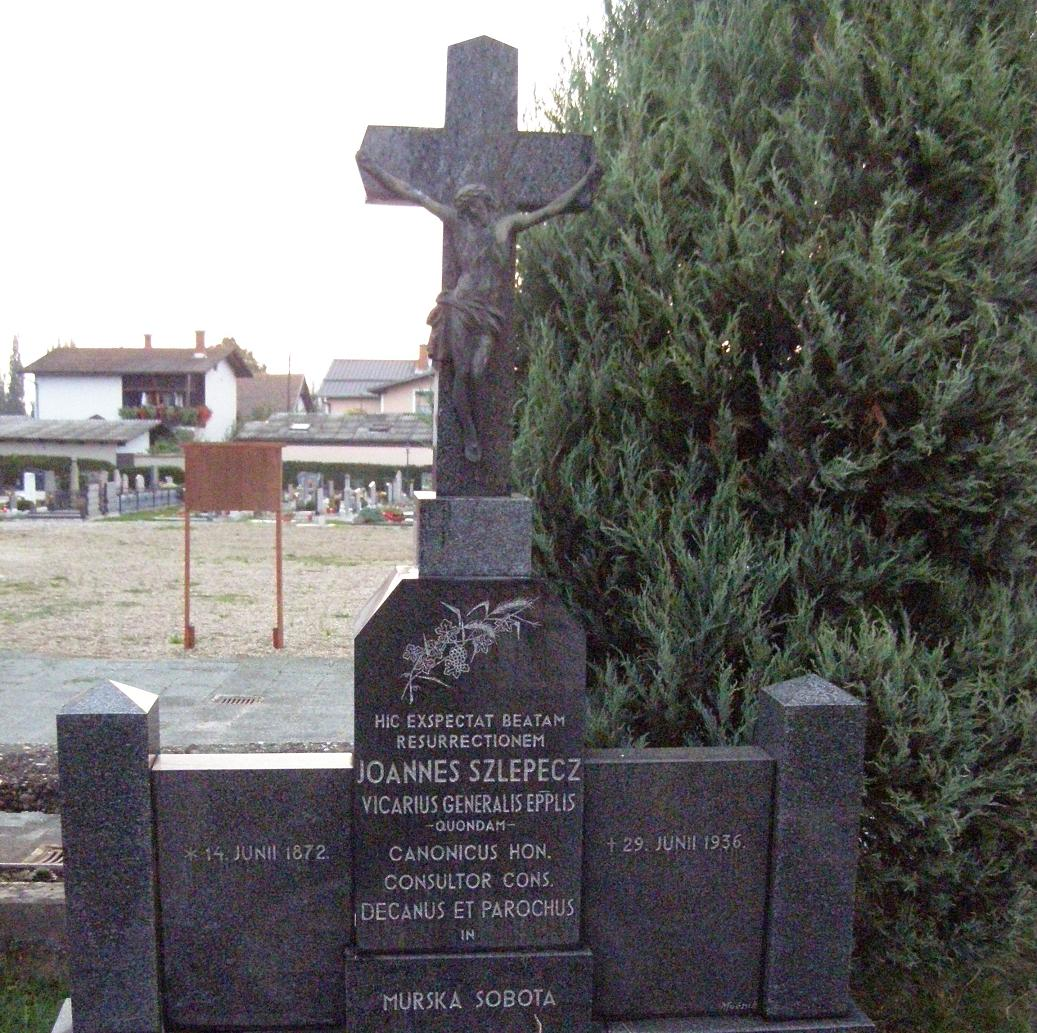
János Szlepecz's grave in Murska Sobota

János Szlepecz (Slovene: Janoš Slepec or Ivan Slepec, June 14, 1872 – June 29, 1936) was a Slovene Roman Catholic priest, dean, and writer. He wrote in the Prekmurje Slovene dialect and also in Hungarian.

He was born in Murska Sobota in Vas County of the Kingdom of Hungary (present-day Slovenia), where his father Iván Szlepecz was a blacksmith in the market town; his mother was Julianna Czigány. Starting in 1896, he served as chaplain for ten years for the Szapáry family, and then in 1906 as the parish priest of Murska Sobota. In 1913, after the death of Ferenc Ivanóczy, he became dean of the Slovene March.

Szlepecz initially opposed the autonomy of the Slovene March (Prekmurje) and supported Hungary. He later shifted his position and supported the Prekmurje Slovenes. After World War I, he maintained the liturgy in Prekmurje Slovene in St. Nicholas's Church. After the occupation of the Republic of Prekmurje, Szlepecz was taken hostage by the Hungarian communists.

In 1918, Szlepecz was the bishopric vicar in Szombathely and in 1922 the honorary vicar in Maribor. Before the First World War, he published articles in Hungarian in Szombathelyi Újság and Muraszombat és vidéke, and articles in Slovene in Marijin list, Novine, and Kalendar Srca Jezušovoga. He also translated the Gospels into Prekmurje Slovene.

János Szlepecz died in Murska Sobota after a stroke.

== Literature ==
- Géfin Gyula A Szombathelyi Egyházmegye története: 1777–1935 III. kötet, Szombathely Martineum Ny., 1935.

== See also ==
- List of Slovene writers and poets in Hungary
