= József Klekl (politician) =

Slovene Roman Catholic priest and politician

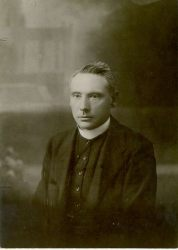
József Klekl.

József Klekl (Slovene: Jožef Klekl) (October 13, 1874 – May 30, 1948) was a Slovene Roman Catholic priest from Prekmurje and politician in Hungary, writer, governor of the Slovene People's Party (Slovenska lüdska stranka), later a delegate in Belgrade. Klekl was an active proponent of the independence of the Slovene March in Hungary (Slovenska krajina), and for some time fusion with the State of Slovenes, Croats and Serbs.

== Early life ==
Klekl born in Prekmurje, in Krajna, in the Vas County of the Kingdom of Hungary. The writer József Klekl (1879–1936), his cousin, was also born here. Because he was older, he is known as Jožef Klekl Stari ('József Klekl Sr.') in Slovenian. His parents, István Klekl and Teréz Sálmán, were farmers. The Klekl family was of German descent. His grandfather Anton Klekl was born in Kellerdorf, near Radkersburg, Austria.

On July 11, 1897, Klekl became a priest and chaplain to Ferenc Ivanóczy in Tišina. At the time, Ivanóczy was the governor of the Hungarian Slovenes. From 1902 to 1903 he was a chaplain in Dürnbach im Burgenland, and from 1903 to 1905 in Črenšovci. In 1905 he became the priest in Pečarovci. In 1910 he retired on a pension and lived in Črenšovci.

== Political activity ==
In 1904 Klekl founded the Hungarian Slovene Catholic newspaper Marijin liszt. In 1914 he founded the semi-radical newspaper Novine. In this paper he took a stance against the Hungarisation of Prekmurje.

In 1918 the Austro-Hungarian Empire was breaking up. Klekl was in connection with the Slovene politician Anton Korošec. Korošec and a few Slovene politicians backed the idea of an independent Slovene March, which would later be part of Yugoslavia. Klekl, József Szakovics, Iván Bassa, István Kühár, and József Csárics worked out the Slovene March programme, but in Hungary the Bolshevik administration came to power and Serbian forces quickly annexed Prekmurje.

For a long time the people of Prekmurje were angry with Klekl because he did not create an independent Slovene territory. The county of Szentgotthárd thus remained in Hungary and in Prekmurje the official language became Slovene, not Prekmurje Slovene.

== After the First World War ==
After 1920, Klekl became a delegate in the Yugoslav capital. In 1941 he enlisted in the Hungarian Army.

Klekl and Szakovics actively wrote and championed the standard Prekmurje Slovene in the 20th century, which was banned after 1945.

Klekl died in Murska Sobota in 1948.

== See also ==
- List of Slovene writers and poets in Hungary
- Prekmurje Slovene
- Slovene March (Kingdom of Hungary)
