= József Bassa =

Slovene poet and Catholic priest (1894–1916)

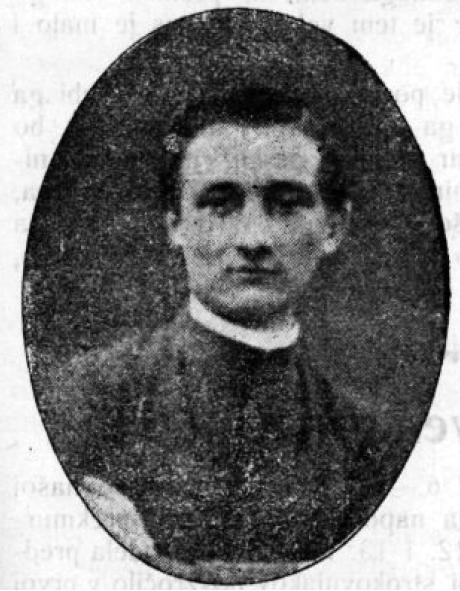
József Bassa (Miroslav).

József Bassa pen name: Miroslav (Slovene: Jožef Baša; 28 April 1894 – 25 January 1916) was a Slovene poet and Catholic priest.

Born in Beltinci, József Bassa was the brother of the writer Iván Bassa. His parents were József Bassa and Anna Vucskó. He published his poems (spiritual and secular works) in the Prekmurje Slovene in Marijin list. Miroslav addressed modern literary experiments.

== Literature ==
- Pokrajinski muzej Murska Sobota, Katalog stalne razstave, Murska Sobota 1997. ISBN 961-90438-1-2

== See also ==
- List of Slovene writers and poets in Hungary
