= Dávid Novák =

Dávid Novák (Slovene: David Novak) was a Hungarian Slovene student and poet. Novák was the author of the first known poem written in Prekmurje Slovene, dating from 1771.

Born in Sümeg into a Lutheran family, he studied at the Bratislava lyceum, where it was customary for the students to write in their native language. Novák's poem was called "Versus Vandalici" (Slovene Poem) and begins "Poszlühne da eszi proszim vasz GOSZPODA / ka bom vam jasz pravo od toda národa ...." The poem also mentions the Battle of Saint Gotthard.

== See also ==
- List of Slovene writers and poets in Hungary

== Literature ==
- Franci Just: Besede iz Porabja, beseda za Porabje, pregled slovstva pri porabskih Slovencih, Franc-Franc Murska Sobota, 2003. ISBN 961-219-070-4
