= Miklós Legén =

Lutheran Slovene teacher

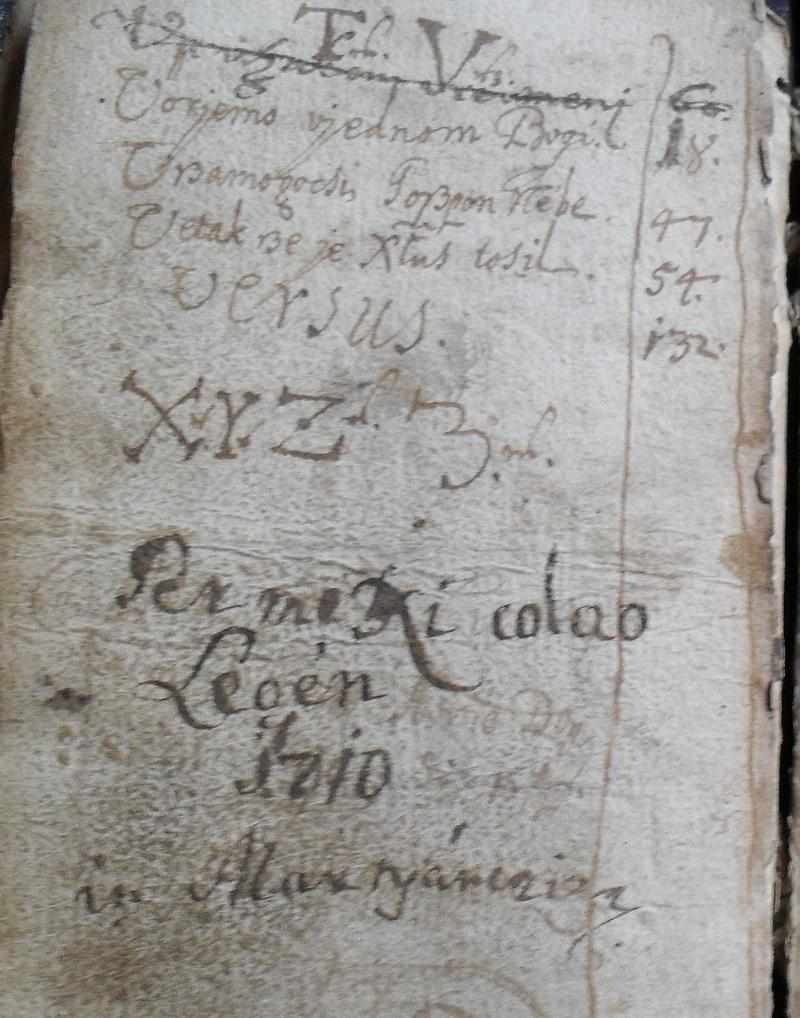
Legén's signature.

Miklóš Legén (Slovene: Mikloš Legen) was a Lutheran Slovene teacher in Mártyáncz, Kingdom of Hungary (today Martjanci, Slovenia) in the Slovene March in the 17th and 18th centuries.

In 1710 he added his signature to the old Martjanci hymnal. The hymnal is the first Prekmurje Slovene work, dating from the 16th century, and it was later added to by various writers. Legén also wrote a few hymns in Prekmurje Slovene and completed the hymnal.

== See also ==
- List of Slovene writers and poets in Hungary

== Literature ==
- Vilko Novak, Martjanska pesmarica, Založba ZRC. 1997. Ljubljana, ISBN 961-6182-27-7
