= László Szobothin =

László Szobothin de Muray-Szombath Slovene: Ladislav Sobotin (lived in the 18th century) was Slovene petty nobleman in Hungary. Lived in Murska Sobota. In 1750, wrote his only work in Latin language: Divus Ivo oratione panegyrica celebratus, dum in academica soc. Jesu D. Joannis Baptista basilica incl. facultas juridica coram senatu populoque academico annuos honores eidem divo tutelari suo solenni ritu instauraret... a. salutis 1750. m. Junio, die 7. Tyrnaviae. 1750. The book published in Trnava.

== See also ==
- List of Slovene writers and poets in Hungary
- Hungarian Slovenes
