= Mária Bajzek Lukács =

Hungarian Slovene language writer and university professor

Mária Bajzek Lukács (Slovene: Marija Bajzek Lukač; born January 24, 1960) is a Hungarian Slovene language writer and university professor.

She was born in Szentgotthárd and spent her childhood in Felsőszölnök. Between 1974 and 1978, she attended the Serbo-Croatian High School in Budapest. In 1978, she started her studies in Ljubljana, and in 1983 received a Slovene and Serbo-Croatian teaching degree. Until 1988, Bajzek Lukács was the editor of Narodne Novine. In 2004, she earned a doctorate in Budapest.

Mária Bajzek is an adjunct professor at the Department of Slavic Philology today at the Faculty of Humanities of the Eötvös Loránd University and a visiting teacher in Maribor. She speaks Hungarian, Slovene (including the local Prekmurje Slovene), Serbian, and Croatian. One area of her research is Prekmurje Slovene. In 2009, she wrote the dictionary of the Felsőszölnök dialect, and in 2010 she translated a book on the history of the Prekmurje Slovene and Slovene.

Her husband István Lukács is also a professor at ELTE.

== Selected works ==
- Marija Bajzek Lukács: Slovar Gornjega Senika A-L, Bielsko Biała 2009. ZORA 66. ISBN 978-961-6656-41-2
- Bajzek Mária, Lukács István, Mladen Pavičić: Szlovén irodalmi antológia, Budapest, 2007, 206-213.

== See also ==
- List of Slovene writers and poets in Hungary
