= Slovene March =

Slovene March (Slovene: Slovenska krajina) may refer to two different geographical-historical administrative entities:

- Windic March, in present-day south-east Slovenia
- Slovene March (Kingdom of Hungary), in present-day north-east Slovenia
