= József Pusztai =

Slovene writer, poet, journalist, teacher and cantor (1864–1934)

József Pusztai (originally József Pozderecz, Slovene: Jožef Pustai; January 26, 1864 – February 13, 1934) was a Slovene writer, poet, journalist, teacher, and cantor in Hungary. He was also known under the pen name Tibor Andorhegyi.

Born in Bellatincz, Muravidék, in Zala County of the Kingdom of Hungary (present-day Beltinci, Prekmurje, Slovenia), his parents were János Pozderecz and Franciska Nemecz. His surname was modified to Pusztai because he thought of himself as a Hungarian and felt it was the duty of ethnic Slovenes to assimilate. In Csáktornya (present-day Čakovec, Croatia) and Pécs he studied to be a teacher, graduating in 1883. After first having worked in Szőce (in the Őrség region), in 1889 he returned to Muravidék (Prekmurje). From 1889 until 1919 he worked in Mártonhely, near Muraszombat (present-day Martjanci, near Murska Sobota) where he wrote the first hymnal in Prekmurje Slovene. He wrote articles for Muraszombat és Vidéke (Murska Sobota and District), for Értesítő in Szombathely, and for Dober pajdás (Good Friend) in Szentgotthárd. In 1919 he returned to his hometown of Beltinci.

== Works ==
- Krcsánszko katholicsanszko pesmi z iz potrejbnimi molitvami i vnógimi vogrszkimi peszmami / Kersztény katholikus egyházi énekek a legszükségesebb imákkal és több magyar énekkel (Catholic Hymnal with Essential Prayers, Prekmurje Slovene and Hungarian text)
- Dober pajdás (1899, 1900, 1901)
- Mála molitvena kniga z potrejbnimi molitvani i vnó gimi peszmami za katholicsanszko mladézen / Kis imakönyv a legszükségesebb imákkal és énekekkel a kath. ifjúság számára (Small Prayer-Book with Essential Prayers for Catholic Youth; Hungarian and Prekmurje Slovene text)

== See also ==
- List of Slovene writers and poets in Hungary
- Beltinci
