= List of Slovene writers and poets in Hungary =

This is a list of Slovene writers and poets in Hungary.

== A ==
- Imre Augustich

== B ==
- József Bagáry
- Mária Bajzek Lukács
- Mihály Bakos
- István Ballér
- Irén Barbér
- Mihály Barla
- Iván Bassa
- József Bassa
- Balázs Berke
- Ferenc Berke
- Mihály Bertalanits
- József Borovnják

== C ==
- György Czipott
- Rudolf Czipott

== D ==
- Alajos Drávecz
- József Dravecz

== F ==
- Ádám Farkas
- János Fliszár

== G ==
- Mihály Gáber
- Alajos Gáspár
- Mátyás Godina

== H ==
- Károly Holecz
- András Horváth
- Ferenc Hüll

== K ==
- János Kardos
- József Klekl (politician)
- József Klekl (writer)
- Bertalan Koczuván
- Péter Kollár
- Mihály Kolossa
- József Konkolics
- József Kossics
- György Kousz
- László Kovács
- Miklós Kovács
- István Kováts
- István Kozel
- Károly Krajczár
- Mátyás Krajczár
- István Kühár (I)
- István Küzmics
- Miklós Küzmics

== L ==
- Miklós Legén
- Gergely Luthár
- Mihály Luttár
- Miklós Luttár
- Pál Luthár
- István Lülik

== M ==
- Miska Magyarics
- Ferenc Marics
- Ferenc Merkli
- Dusán Mukics
- János Murkovics

== N ==
- Dávid Novák
- Ferenc Novák

== O ==
- Ferenc Oslay

== P ==
- István Pauli
- Ágoston Pável
- Irén Pavlics
- Iván Persa
- István Pintér
- József Pusztai

== R ==
- András Rogan
- Cantor-teacher Ruzsics

== S ==
- Ferenc Sbüll
- Antal Stevanecz
- József Szakovics
- Jakab Szabár
- István Szelmár
- István Szijjártó
- János Szlepecz
- István Szmodis
- József Szmodis
- László Szobothin

== T ==
- Ferenc Talányi
- Ferenc Temlin
- János Terbócs
- Sándor Terplán
- Vilmos Tkálecz (Vilmos Tarcsay)

== V ==
- Mihály Szever Vanecsai

== Z ==
- Terézia Zakoucs
- István Zsemlics
- János Zsupánek
- Mihály Zsupánek
