= Mihály Bakos =

Hungarian Slovene Lutheran priest, author and educator

- Born: c. 1742; Šalovci, Habsburg Kingdom of Hungary (now in Prekmurje region, Slovenia)
- Died: 9 April 1803
- Other names: Miháo Bakoš, Mihael Bakoš
- Occupation(s): Lutheran priest, author, educator
- Notable work: Slovene hymnal "Krszcsánszke peszmene knige" (Christian Hymnal)
- Relatives: Ferenc Bakos (father), Éva Ábraham (mother)

Mihály Bakos, also known in Slovene as Miháo Bakoš or Mihael Bakoš, (c. 1742 – 9 April 1803) was a Hungarian Slovene Lutheran priest, author, and educator.

He was born in a Slovene-speaking family in the village of Šalovci, in the Habsburg Kingdom of Hungary, today in the Prekmurje region of Slovenia. His parents were Ferenc Bakos and Éva Ábraham. In 1779, he became a pastor in Surd, then part of the County of Somogy (now in Zala County). In the 17th and 18th centuries, numerous Slovene families from the Slovene March settled in Somogy. Many of them were Lutheran, and so Slovene-language services were set up for them. Bakos' predecessor was István Küzmics, a Slovene writer that translated the New Testament into his local Prekmurje Slovene.

Between 1784 and 1785, Bakos served as a pastor in Križevci (Hungarian Tótkeresztúr), in Prekmurje. He later returned to Somogy, where he served as the dean for Somogy and Zala counties. In 1791, he wrote the Slovene hymnal Krszcsánszke peszmene knige (Christian Hymnal).

== See also ==
- Slovenes in Somogy
- List of Slovene writers and poets in Hungary
