= Ferenc Talányi =

Slovene writer, painter and politician

- Born: Ferenc Temlin; 23 May 1883; Brezovci
- Died: 9 July 1959 (aged 76); Murska Sobota
- Occupations: Writer, journalist, and painter

Ferenc Talányi (born Ferenc Temlin, Slovene: Franc Talanyi, or Talanji) (23 May 1883 – 9 July 1959) was a Slovene writer, journalist, and painter from Prekmurje.

== Biography ==
Ferenc Talányi was born in Brezovci, near Puconci in Slovenia as the son of Mihály Temlin and Katarina Frankó. Both his parents were Lutheran peasants. He studied the catering trade in Budapest, and later in Germany. In his youth Temlin changed his surname to Talányi. He worked as a restaurateur in the Slovene March (Prekmurje), in Ormož, and in Bad Radkersburg, while also working as editor of the almanac Dober pajdás kalendárium.

In 1919, Talányi supported the Hungarian Soviet Republic, was a member of the communist party and supported the worker's movement in Prekmurje. After the downfall of the Hungarian Soviet Republic, he moved to the Štajerska region. He worked as an editor of several newspapers and distanced himself from the Magyarization policy; he even wrote Dober pajdás in Slovene.

He was arrested in 1930, as the region was now under Yugoslav rule, and his communist past played against him. In 1941, after the Magyar occupation of Prekmurje he briefly wrote Dober pajdás in the Prekmurje dialect but then joined the communist partisans under the pseudonym Očka (Papa). He was captured in January 1945 and convicted for imprisonment in German prisons, but only served a few months. After World War II he was a member of several political organizations in Yugoslavia. In 1955, he published an article in Pomurski vestnik in which Talányi emphasized his communist past. He died in 1959 in Murska Sobota.

== See also ==
- List of Slovene writers and poets in Hungary
