= Miklós Luttár =

Slovene-Hungarian writer, poet and teacher

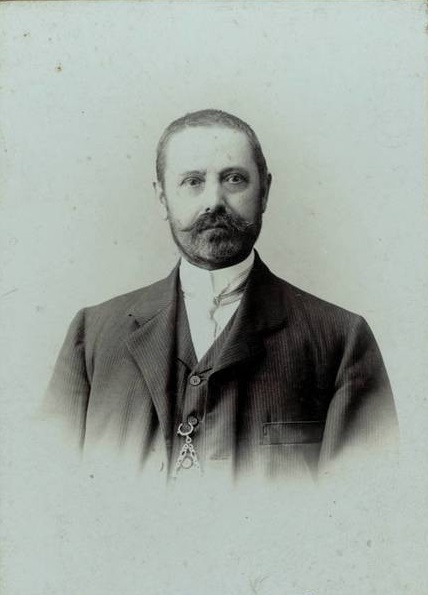
- Born: 15 June 1851; Muraszombat, Kingdom of Hungary, Austrian Empire
- Died: 8 November 1936 (aged 85); Budapest
- Occupations: teacher; writer

Miklós Luttár (Slovene: Mikloš Lutar; June 15, 1851 – November 8, 1936) was a Slovene-Hungarian writer, poet and teacher in Hungary.

Luttár was born in Muraszombat in the Kingdom of Hungary (now Murska Sobota, Slovenia). He was the son of Miklós Luttár Sr., an ironmonger and petty nobleman, and Erzsébet Sztergár. From 1873 until 1898 he was a teacher in Lendvarózsavölgy (now Gančani, Slovenia). In 1898, he lived and worked in Fiume (now Rijeka, Croatia). After World War I he moved to Budapest. He died there in 1936.

In 1888 Luttár adapted the bilingual catechism Máli katekizmus za katholicsanszke soule, containing 32 pages in the standardized Prekmurje dialect of Slovene and 32 pages in Hungarian. It was printed in Murska Sobota. Luttár's catechism experienced a complete failure among the Slovene people and priests. Luttár's catechism is full of grammatical mistakes, besides being a Magyarization school book.

== See also ==
- Hungarian Slovenes
- List of Slovene writers and poets in Hungary

== Literature ==
- Smej, Jožef (2001): Skrb dekana Vendela Ratkoviča in dekanijske komisije za čistejši jezik v Málem katekizmusu Mikloša Luttarja iz leta 1888. Slavistična revija.
- Neverjetna usoda medžimurskega "jezika". Arhivi : glasilo Arhivskega društva in arhivov Slovenije (2016).
