= Alajos Drávecz =

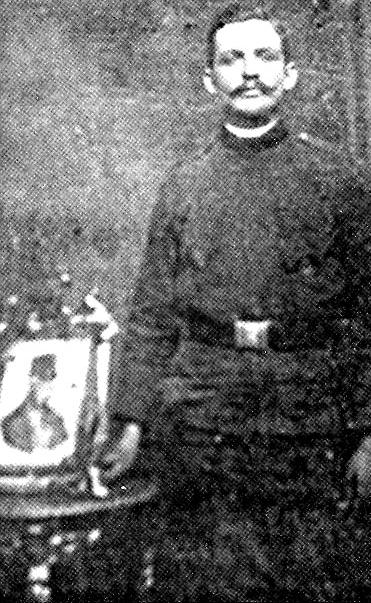
Alajos Drávecz

Alajos Drávecz (Slovene: Alojz Dravec) (29 November 1866 – 28 August 1915) was a Slovenian ethnologist and writer.

Born in Rábatótfalu (now Szentgotthárd). His parents were István Drávecz and Rozália Korpics. The young Drávecz and his wife emigrated to the USA, then came back to Hungary, and settled down in Rábakethely (now Szentgotthárd).
In 1915 Drávecz joined the forces and call out in North-Hungary (Slovakia), later in Moravia. He was killed in Lipník nad Bečvou, near Olomouc.

Drávecz noted down the Slovene popular costume in the Luca day, and the Andrew day, and folk songs.

== His work ==
- Národna vera i navade v vési

== See also ==
- List of Slovene writers and poets in Hungary
- Hungarian Slovenes
