= Alajos Gáspár =

Alajos Gáspár (Slovene: Alojz Gašpar) (1848 – September 22, 1919) was a Hungarian Slovene writer.

He was born in Alsószölnök. In 1884 he translated the book Sybil (titled Sibilinszka Kniga ali Proroküvanye od Kralicze Mihalde od Sabe, XIII. Sibila. Szpiszana szo z nemskoga na szlovenszki jezik obrnjena od Gáspár Alajosa na Gorényem sziniku. Doli szpiszano 1884. leta. Szabolin Lujzi; manuscript held by the University of Ljubljana Library) from German into Prekmurje Slovene.

== See also ==
- List of Slovene writers and poets in Hungary
- Sibyl
