= János Terbócs =

Slovene Lutheran priest

János Terbócs or Terbocs (Slovene: Janoš Terboč, or Ivan Terboč) was a Slovene Lutheran priest, dean, and writer in the 17th century in the Slovene March (Kingdom of Hungary).

He was probably born in Murska Sobota. He served for a time in Csepreg, and on May 5, 1616 he moved to Felsőlendva (Grad). In 1625, he was the dean of Murska Sobota and he signed the Lutheran document Formule Concordiae.

He died in Csepreg. Terbócs was the author of some Prekmurje Slovene hymns.

== See also ==
- List of Slovene writers and poets in Hungary
