= Irén Pavlics =

Hungarian Slovene author and editor (1934–2022)

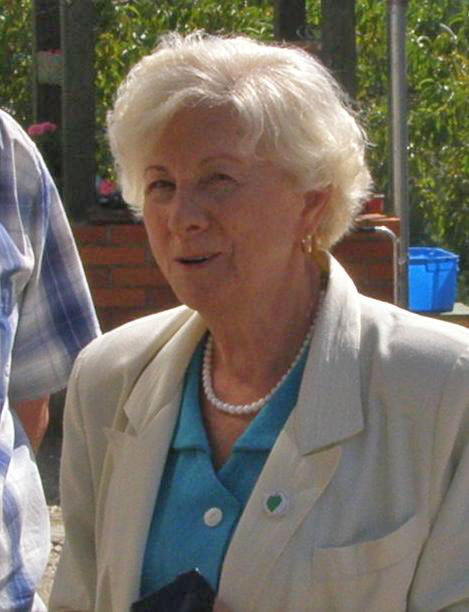
Irén Pavlics

Irén Pavlics (Slovene: Irena Pavlič) (15 November 1934 – 2 February 2022) was a Hungarian Slovene author and editor.

Pavlics was born in the village of Rábatótfalu (today the suburb of Szentgotthárd), Hungary, in 1934. She graduated from Szeged and by 1972 was a mistress in Apátistvánfalva. By 1990 she was an arch-lecturer for the Democratic League of South Slavs in Hungary. In 1990 she became a secretary for the League of Hungarian Slovenes. She wrote articles in Slovene in the Narodne Novine, Narodni kalendar. In 1986 she wrote the Slovenski koledar, in 1990 in the newspaper Porabje.

She died in Budapest on 2 February 2022, at the age of 87.

== Works ==
- Manjšinski zakon na Madžarskem
- Moji spomini na Števanovce

== See also ==
- List of Slovene writers and poets in Hungary
