= László Kovács (writer) =

Hungarian writer (born 1950)

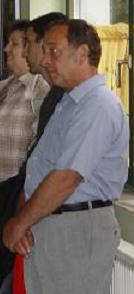
László Kovács

László Kovács (Slovene: Laci Kovač, Ladislav Kovač; December 15, 1950) is a Hungarian Slovene-language writer, amateur actor, and beekeeper. Kovács was born in Vashegyalja, Vas county, Hungary (today Kétvölgy). His father, Vilmos Kovács, is of Hungarian descent, and his mother was a Slovene, Mária Zankócs. In the 1970s and 2000s, he taught in Apátistvánfalva. Between 1998 and 2006 he was the mayor of Apátistvánfalva. Kovács led the amateur theatrical company Veseli Pajdaši after Irén Barbér's death and authored a few comedies in Prekmurje Slovene, and with his group received the national prize A Nemzetiségi Hagyományok Átörökítéséért (For the Legacy of Minority Cultures) in 2010 at the ARCUSFEST international theater festival in Budapest.

Kovács is also a recognized beekeeper in the Slovene region of Hungary, who uses the old traditional apiary methods and produces some specialty honey.

== Literature ==
- Franci Just: Besede iz Porabja, besede za Porabja, Franc-Franc, Murska Sobota 2003. ISBN 961-219-070-4
- Franci Just: Porabje, Franc-Franc, Murska Sobota 2009. ISBN 978-961-255-017-2
- Bea Baboš Logar: Prekmurska narečna slovstvena ustvarjalnost – mednarodno znanstveno srečanje: prekmurščina zanimiva tudi za tuje znanstvenike, Vestnik July 17, 2003.
