= József Dravecz =

Slovene Roman Catholic priest, canon, dean, and writer (1697–1779)

József Dravecz, born Márk Drávecz, also known in Slovene as Jožef Marko Dravec (20 March 1697 – 17 July 1779), was a Slovene Roman Catholic priest, canon, dean, and writer in the Kingdom of Hungary.

== Biography ==
Dravecz was born in Beltinci in the area of the Bishopric of Zagreb. His native language was Prekmurje Slovene. He mostly lived in the Hungarian settlements of Vál and Pázmánd. He died in Veszprém.

Dravecz renovated the church in Vál. Wrote in Latin.

== Works ==
- Per ardua ad sublime dignitatis fastigium evecto Martino Biro, recens in episcopum Veszprimiensem consecrato. Buda, 1745.
- Promulgatio jubilaei universalis anni 1776 per dioecesim Veszprimiensem. Jaurini.

== See also ==
- List of Slovene writers and poets in Hungary
