= Mihály Luttár =

Slovene writer

Mihály Luttár (Slovene: Miháo Lutar) was a Slovene petty nobleman in the 17th century. He was born in the Slovene Circumscription (Slovenska okroglina, today Prekmurje), but lived in the Croatian town of Međimurje, Kutnjak, near Legrad. In 1650 or 1651, he let out the blotters of István Bánffy and wrote notes about the Luttár family.

== See also ==
- List of Slovene writers and poets in Hungary

== Sources ==
- Szinnyei József: Magyar írók élete és munkái VIII. (Löbl–Minnich). Budapest: Hornyánszky. 1902. → Luttár Mihály
