= Brezovci, Puconci =

Brezovci
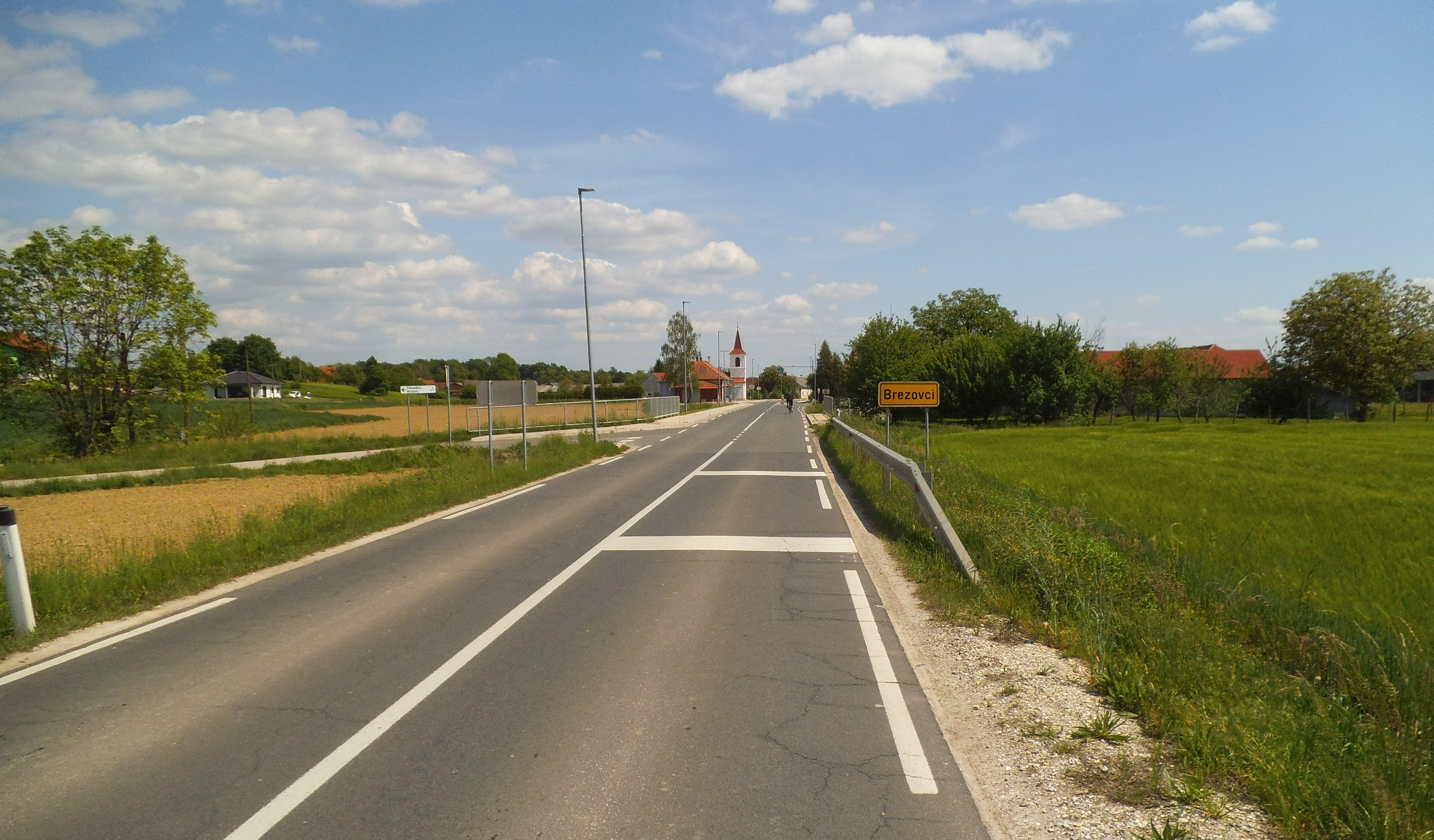

- Location in Slovenia
- Coordinates: 46°42′21.41″N 16°7′16.01″E
- Country: Slovenia
- Traditional region: Prekmurje
- Statistical region: Mura
- Municipality: Puconci

Area
  - Total: 4.23 km^{2} (1.63 sq mi)
- Elevation: 203 m (666 ft)

Population (2024)
  - Total: 248
  - Density: 58.6/km^{2} (152/sq mi)

Brezovci (pronounced [ˈbɾeːzɔu̯tsi]; Hungarian: Vasnyíres) is a village in the Municipality of Puconci in the Prekmurje region of Slovenia.

There is a small chapel in the centre of the village with a three-story belfry.

== Notable people ==
Notable people that were born or lived in Brezovci include:

- Ferenc Talányi (a.k.a. Ferenc Temlin), editor of the Prekmurje Slovene almanac Dober pajdás (The Good Friend).
