= József Bagáry =

Slovene religious leader

József Bagáry (Slovene: Jožef Bagari; January 8, 1840 – May 14, 1919) was Slovene Roman Catholic priest and writer in Hungary.

Born in Muraszombat, Vas County, Kingdom of Hungary (present-day Murska Sobota, Slovenia). His father was József Bagáry, Hungarian petty nobleman, his mother was Slovene, Katalin Monek.
He studied in Kőszeg and Szombathely, was consecrated on July 14, 1866. Chaplain in Szentgyörgy, Cserencsócz, Tissina and Muraszombat (now Sveti Jurij, Rogašovci, Črenšovci, Tišina and Murska Sobota, Slovenia).

By 1874 priest in Martyáncz (now Martjanci, Slovenia), in 1912 was retire on a pension, and died in Murska Sobota.

== Works ==
- First Reader (Perve Knige – čtenyá za Katholičanske vesničke šolé na Povelênye drüžbe svétoga Števana správlene: po Bárány Ignáci pripravnice vučitel – ravnitel Elsö olvasó – könyv)

== See also ==
- List of Slovene writers and poets in Hungary
