= Cantor-teacher Ruzsics =

Hungarian Slovene elementary school teacher, cantor and poet

Cantor-teacher Ruzsics (Prekmurje Slovene: Kantor-školnik Ružič, standard Slovene: Kantor-učitelj Ružič) was a Hungarian Slovene elementary school teacher, cantor, and poet in the 18th century. He lived and worked in village of Felsőszölnök, Hungary. His first name and ethnicity are unknown. The surnames Ruzsics and Rüsics occur in Felsőszölnök today, but this does not prove that his ancestors were Slovenians; he was most probably of Croatian descent.

He wrote a Slovenian hymnal in 1789; the book consists of liturgical songs in the Prekmurje dialect. It was later copied and distributed by Mihály Bertalanits and Ferenc Marics.

== See also ==
- List of Slovene writers and poets in Hungary
