= Martjanci =

Martjanci Marčanci, Merčonci
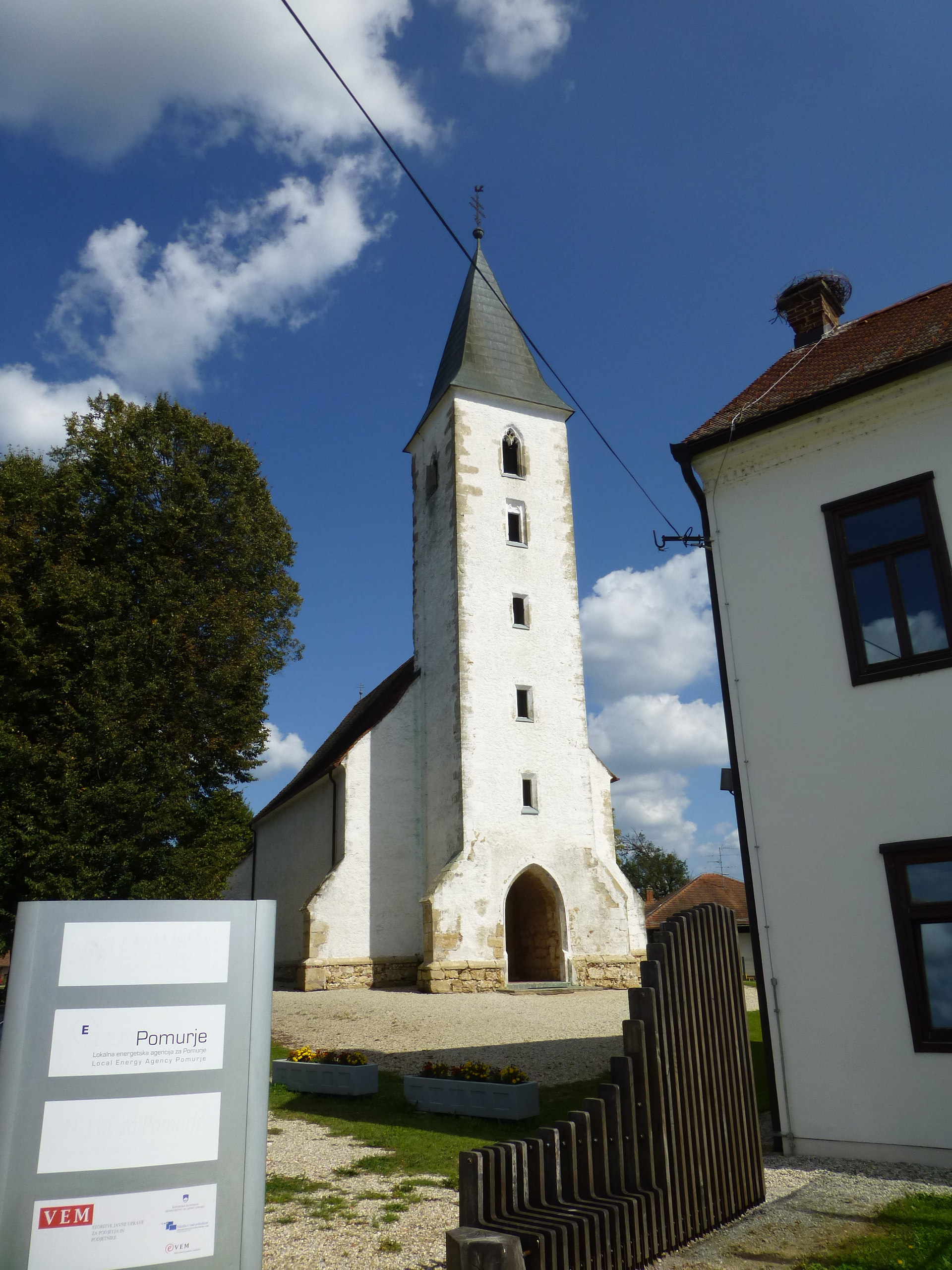
- Gothic St. Martin's Church in Martjanci

- Location in Slovenia
- Coordinates: 46°41′5.16″N 16°11′26.08″E
- Country: Slovenia
- Traditional region: Prekmurje
- Statistical region: Mura
- Municipality: Moravske Toplice

Area
  - Total: 3.7 km^{2} (1.4 sq mi)
- Elevation: 193.9 m (636 ft)

Population (2002)
  - Total: 492

Martjanci (pronounced [maɾˈtjaːntsi]; Hungarian: Mártonhely, Prekmurje Slovene: Marčanci or Merčonci) is a village between Murska Sobota and Moravske Toplice in the Prekmurje region of Slovenia.

It is known for its parish church dedicated to Saint Martin, from which the village gets its name. It is a single-nave church built in 1392 on the site of an older church. The presbytery is vaulted and covered in frescos by the 14th-century local artist Johannes Aquila (fl. 1378–1392), who also painted the churches in Velemér, Turnišče, and Fürstenfeld. The paintings are signed and a self-portrait of the artist is included in the scheme. It is among the earliest European self-portraits. The main altar was created in marble in 1925 based on plans by the architect Jože Plečnik (1872–1957).

The Martjanci hymnal (Slovene: Martjanska pesmarica) was compiled in Martjanci in a mixture of Prekmurje Slovene and Kajkavian dialect in the 16th and 17th centuries. This manuscript hymnal, kept at the university library in Maribor, is an exceptionally important literary monument because of its contents and the use of dialect, which influenced later transcriptions of Prekmurje folk songs.

The writers Miklós Legén, Mihály Terplán, József Pusztai, and József Bagáry lived in the village.

== Bibliography ==
- Novak, Vilko (1997). Martjanska pesmarica. Ljubljana: Založba ZRC. ISBN 961-6182-27-7.
