= István Kozel =

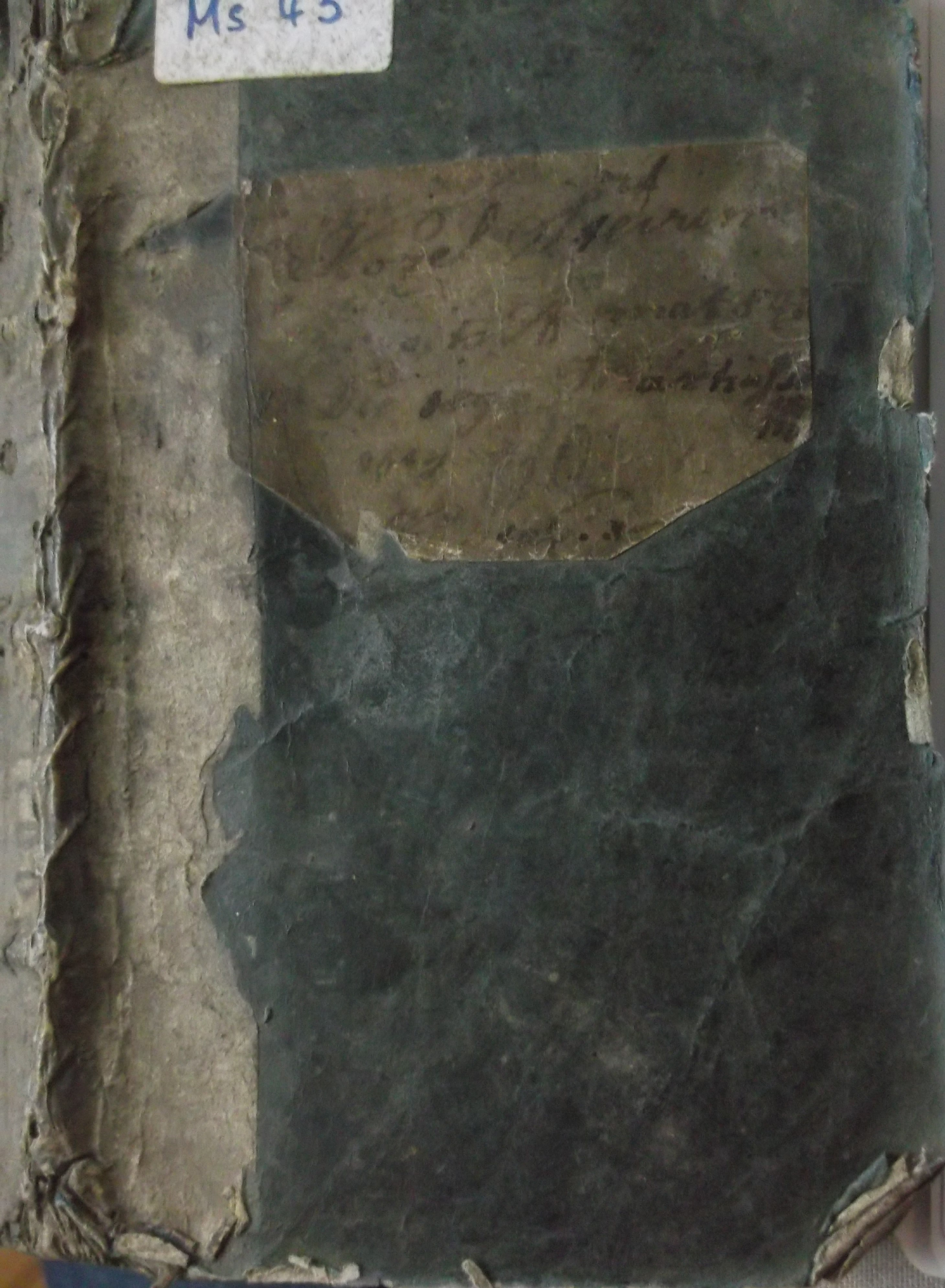
Kozel's hymnal.

István Kozel (Slovene: Števan Kozel) was the author of the Catholic hymnal Prva krašička pesmarica written in the Prekmurje Slovene in the 18th century. Kozel lived in Krašči in the Slovene March (Prekmurje) in the Kingdom of Hungary. The hymnal probably originally contained 350 pages, but only 328 pages remain.

== Literature ==
- Vilko Novak: Martjanska pesmarica, Založba ZRC. Ljubljana 1997. ISBN 961-6182-27-7

== See also ==
- List of Slovene writers and poets in Hungary
