= Ágoston Pável =

Hungarian Slovene linguist (1886–1946)

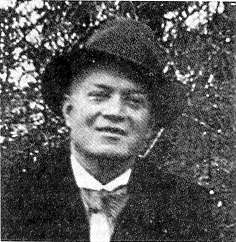

Ágoston Pável, also known in Slovenian as Avgust Pavel (28 August 1886, Cankova, Kingdom of Hungary, today in Slovenia – 2 January 1946, Szombathely, Hungary) was a Hungarian Slovene poet, ethnologist, linguist and teacher.

== Education ==
Ágoston Pável was born in Cankova (then part of Vas County) as the third child of Iván Pável, a tailor, and Erzsébet Obal. He attended elementary school in his native village. Although Slovene was his native language, Ágoston Pável graduated with excellence from a Hungarian-speaking high school in Szentgotthárd, being the top student among 28 from 1897 through 1901. In these early days, a friendly relationship developed between Pável and his class teacher Győző Schmidt. Schmidt, who was the high school's librarian and the editor of the local newspaper, and taught him both Hungarian and Latin.

Pável continued his studies at Premont College in Szombathely (1901–05). While attending college, he participated in the Society for Voluntary Further Education. Some of his first epigrams, ballads, and historical elegies appeared in Bimbófüzér, the school newspaper.

From 1905 to 1909, Pável studied Hungarian and Latin at the Philosophical Faculty of Péter Pázmány University in Budapest. In addition to his specialist area, he attended classes on Serbo-Croatian and Russian and on comparative research on the Slavonic languages as a research associate. Pável received a scholarship, was exempted from tuition fees, and taught as an assistant professor. One of his students was Albert Szent-Györgyi, later a Nobel Prize winner in physiology.

On May 15, 1909, he published a critical essay on two disquisitions by Oszkár Asbóth on Slavic-Hungarian speech forms — one which examined Slavic stem words and the mutations of the sounds "j" and "gy" among Hungarian Slovenes, and another on the academic speech of western Hungary, which had been Pável's research focus.

The first verses of Ágoston Pável were published (in Hungarian) in the newspaper Muraszombat és Vidéke ("Murska Sobota and its district") and (in the Prekmurje Slovene) in "Novine", "Martijin List" and "Kolendar". On November 13, 1909, Pável read some Slovene verse translations and some of his own poetry at the Hungarian folklore symposium.

Also in 1909 the Hungarian Academy of Science published Pável's essay on the phonology of Slovene in the district of Vashidegkút; the essay formed a part of his dissertation. This work won an award at the university and was highly recognized. Professor Asbóth commented: "I am a little angry, however, not at Pletersnik [a Slovene linguist and literary historian], but at such Hungarian linguists who use their vocabulary with simplicity. I explicitly recommend them Pável's rich essays, because they can learn a lot from them."

== Military service and teaching career ==
In 1909-10 Ágoston Pável served in the 7th Graz and then in the 82nd Székelyudvarhely (Transylvania) infantry. Due to an administrative mistake, the infantry number 83 was mistakenly written as number 82 and he was detailed to military service in Transylvania. The "People's News" of 1986 wrote in commemoration of Pável that he spent his little spare time in the army in collecting popular verse, songs, customs and clothing.

From 1910 to 1911 Pável served a practicum teaching at the academic main high school in the Budapest second district. From 1911 to 1913 he was a substitute teacher at the national main high school of Torda. On April 14, 1914, he married Irene Benko in Szentgotthárd.

On June 10, 1914, he became a fully certified teacher but was promptly drafted into military service. On September 6 he was badly injured in the battle of Lemberg (Lviv), which resulted in five years of illness. In 1986 the "People's News" noted: "Pável Ágoston despised the war a lot. What bigger joy could have befallen him than being injured right in the first battle, since he could get away from this senseless war. During the years of sickness he kept writing and translating."

In 1916 Pável received a Hungarian Academy of Science award for his work "Modern Standard Slovene." "With his work the author shows the ambitions that can be noticed in the field of standard language, with great poetic-linguistic expertise and with the basic knowledge of the national Slovene language, which approximates the Slovene that can be found in Austria and differs from it in its popularity" (Academic information sheet, May 1917).

In May 1919 he was elected as a member of the Department of Public Education of Dombóvár and was also appointed to the editorial committee of the local weekly paper. From May 1920 till August 1933 he worked as a teacher at the national girls' high school of Szombathely. On November 16, 1920, he was appointed to the Philosophical Faculty of the University of Ljubljana.

== Literary and academic work ==
In 1924, he was in charge of the library of the cultural organisation of Vas County and of the city of Szombathely. In 1925 he compiled and published a service directory of cultural organisations for the library of Vas County and the city of Szombathely. By January 1, 1926, he had completed the indexing and restructuring of the museum library. "The year 1926 marks a watershed in the history of the cultural organisation library, because due to the cooperation of Pável Ágoston a new vitality ran through the veins of the library, and thus the former strict rules and restrictions were lifted."

In February 1928 began a friendship with Ferenc Móra and Vilko Novak. In September 1928 he took charge of the museum of Vas County and of the folklore magazine, and in November 1928 of that year Pável founded the Association of Amity of the Vas County Museum. For the school year 1928-29 Pável opened his home to the 15-year-old Sándor Weöres, who was later to become a well-known Hungarian poet.

On April 27, 1932, Pável became a member of the caucus of the Folklore Society, and on June 12, 1939, a member of the correspondence department. In December 1932 was published his first compendium of verse called "Praying in The Bosom of The Blind Valley".

From March 1933 until his death in 1946 he was the editor of the scientific journal Vasi Szemle ("Vas Review"). Pável formulated and declared the journal's objective as "a dedication to and an appreciation of the cultural problems in the history of Vas County and west Hungary."

On August 1, 1933, he was shifted to Faludi High School. In 1934 became an honorary secretary member of the Hungarian National Culture Association. In the same year he gained membership of the Erdély Szépmíves Céh publishing company. From March 26, 1936, he was a member of the Tömörkény Society in Szeged.

In the spring of 1936 he and Dr. Sándor Gonyei went on a journey through the Örség National Park, which resulted in his work "Pictures from Örség". In 1936 his second compendium of verse, entitled "Forest On Fire", was published.

In 1937 Pável's translation of the most significant literary works of Ivan Cankar — Hlapec Jernej in njegova resnica ("The Bailiff Yerney and His Right"), Potepuh Marko ("Scapegrace Marko") and the novel Kralj Matjaž ("King Matthew") — were published in "Nyugat".

In 1940 due to the fusion of Vas County and Zala County the Vas review expanded its mandate to become a review for western Hungary. On June 15, 1940, he became a member of the Gárdony Society. On August 26, 1940, he again visited Örség, where together with István Győrffy and Károly Visky he accumulated material for a monograph. On December 13, 1940, he was elected member of the Pen Klub.

In 1941 the translation of the literary works of Ivan Cankar appeared as part of the series on south Slavic authors. The Hungarian culture review wrote on March 15, 1941: "The translation by Ágoston Pável is artistic and perfect." In February 1941 at the Philosophical Faculty of Szeged University Pável was private tutor for the subjects of South Slavic language and literature, and on September 27 of that year he joined the Janus Pannonius Society.

In 1944 he developed the curriculum for the study of the Hungarian language and composed a Hungarian literary history for use in the schools in the Mura region in Slovene-speaking Hungary. in May 1945 he was elected president of the local pedagogic "Free Province Organisation" and began work as an official interpreter for Russian in Vas County. In June 1945, on his own initiative, he developed and taught the first Russian course to be held in Szombathely. On November 18, 1945, he was a member of the János Batsányi Literary Society of Pécs.

Ágoston Pável died on January 2, 1946, in Szombathely.

== See also ==
- Hungarian Slovenes
- Prekmurje
- List of Slovene writers and poets in Hungary
