= Krašči =

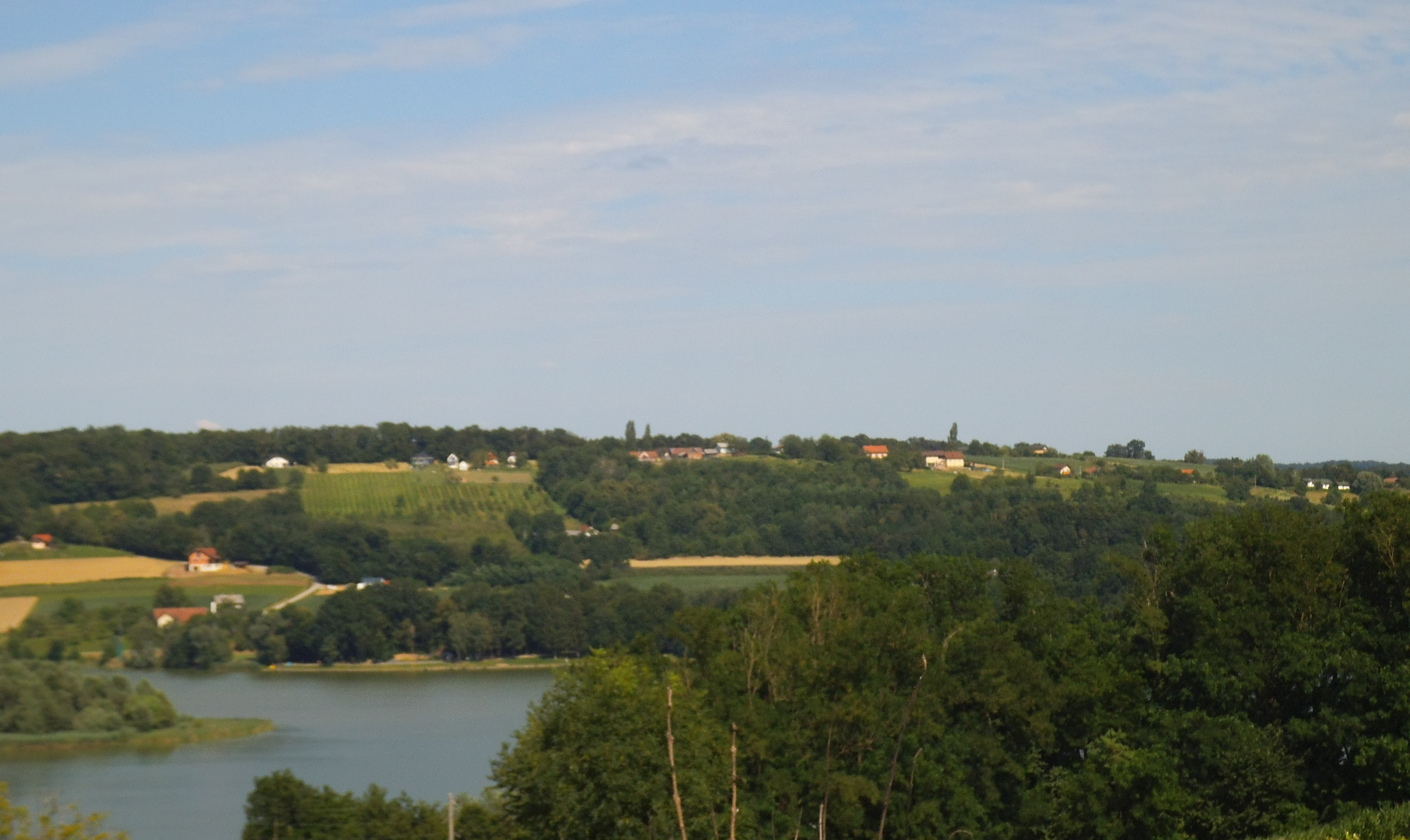

- Location in Slovenia
- Coordinates: 46°45′7.37″N 16°2′6.9″E
- Country: Slovenia
- Traditional region: Prekmurje
- Statistical region: Mura
- Municipality: Cankova

Area
  - Total: 3.39 km^{2} (1.31 sq mi)
- Elevation: 225.2 m (739 ft)

Population (2020)
  - Total: 245
  - Density: 72.3/km^{2} (187/sq mi)

Krašči (pronounced [ˈkɾaːʃtʃi]; Hungarian: Lendvakirályfa) is a village in the Municipality of Cankova in the Prekmurje region of northeastern Slovenia. The Ledava River runs through the settlement and the reservoir created by the dam south of the village divides the village into two settlements.

István Kozel wrote a hymnal in Prekmurje Slovene in the 18th century in Krašči.
