= Apátistvánfalva =

Apátistvánfalva Stephansdorf · Števanovci
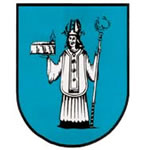
- Coat of arms

- Location of Apátistvánfalva
- Coordinates: 46.89679°N 16.25436°E
- Country: Hungary
- County: Vas

Area
  - Total: 12.86 km^{2} (4.97 sq mi)

Population (2015)
  - Total: 377
  - Density: 31.1/km^{2} (81/sq mi)
- Time zone: UTC+1 (CET)
  - Summer (DST): UTC+2 (CEST)
- Postal code: 9982
- Area code: 94

Apátistvánfalva (Slovene: Števanovci, German: Stephansdorf) is a village in Vas County, Hungary.

== Notable residents ==
- Károly Krajczár (born 1936), Hungarian Slovene teacher
- Ferenc Marics (1791–1844), Hungarian teacher
- Antal Stevanecz (1861–1921), Hungarian Slovene teacher and writer
- Iren Pavlics (1934–2022), Hungarian Slovene author and editor
