= Irén Barbér =

Irén Barbér, born Irén Talabér (Slovene: Irena Barber February 9, 1939 – May 1, 2006), was a Slovene author, journalist, and notary in Hungary.

Born in Permise (Kétvölgy), her parents were Ferenc Talabér and Teréz Merkli. She studied in Győr and Szombathely, and worked in Felsőszölnök and Alsószölnök as a notary. In 1957 she formed an amateur theater company and primarily wrote comedies in Prekmurje Slovene (the Raba March dialect). Her first of several works was the Živlenje je kratko (Life is Short) and Trnova paut (Thorny Path).

She died in Szombathely, in the Markusovszky Hospital.
