= Iván Bassa =

Slovenian Roman Catholic priest and writer

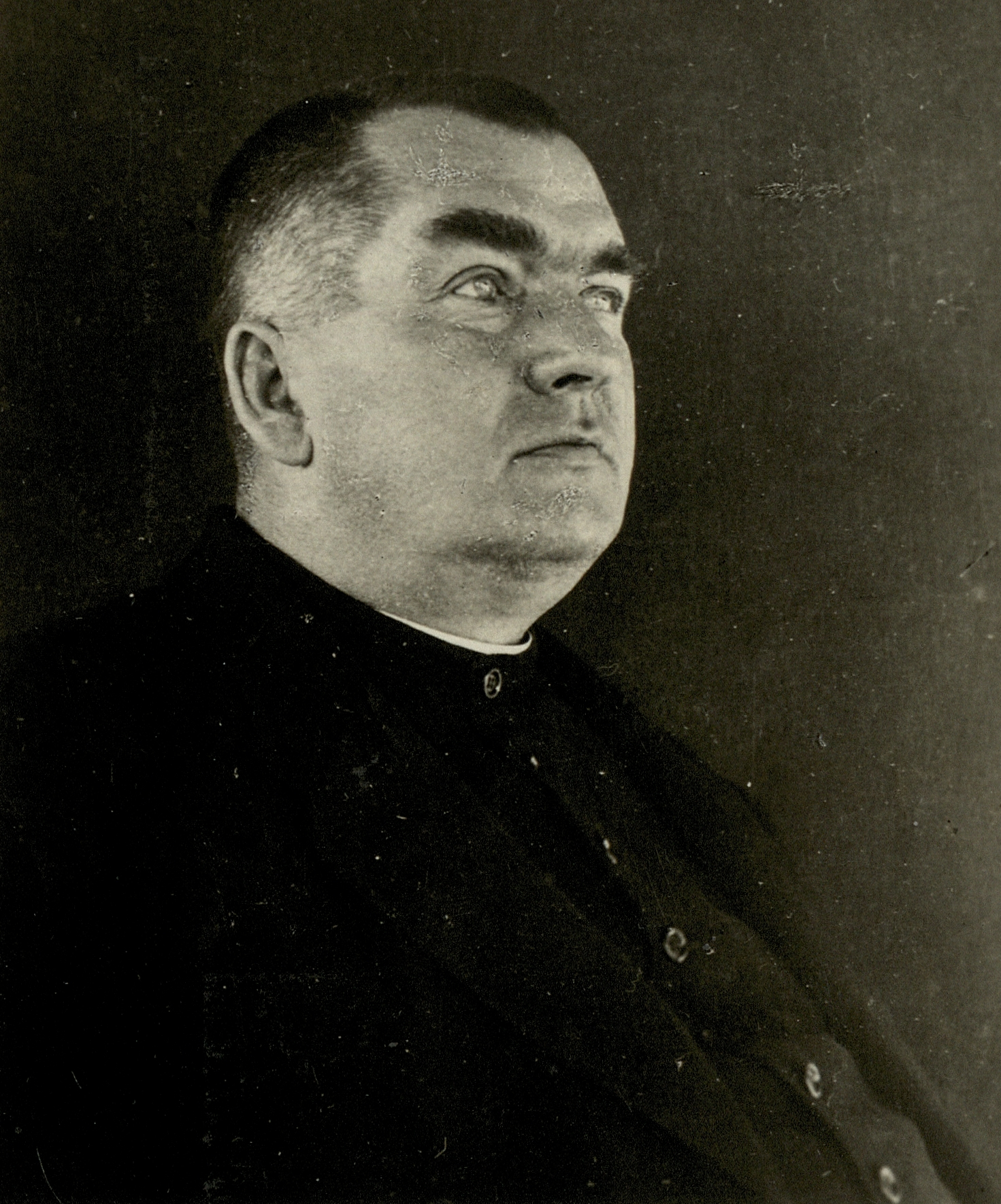
Ivan Bassa

Iván Bassa Slovene Ivan Baša (11 April 1875 – 13 February 1931) Slovenian Roman Catholic priest, writer and politic.

Born in Beltinci (in Prekmurje, then part of Hungary), his parents József Bassa and Anna Vucsko. Was consecrate on 16 July 1898. Chaplain in Sankt Martin an der Raab, Sveti Jurij, Rogašovci and Rechnitz. In 1905-1908 priest in Újhegy, then in Bogojina.

Bassa was befriend Yugoslavia and the accession Wendic March (Prekmurje on the State of Slovenes, Croats and Serbs. After 1920 be at the back of the catholic Hungarian schools in the Prekmurje. In 1925 build a new church in Bogojina.

== Works ==
- Katolicsanszki katekizmus za solare III.-V. razreda. Budapest. Od Drüzsbe szvétoga Stevana (szlovén kis katekizmus). 1909.
- Katolicsanszki katekizmus za solare III.-V. razreda. Drügi natisz. Budapest. Od Drüzsbe szvétoga Stevana. 1913.

== See also ==
- List of Slovene writers and poets in Hungary
