= Szentgotthárd =

Szentgotthárd Monošter
- Town
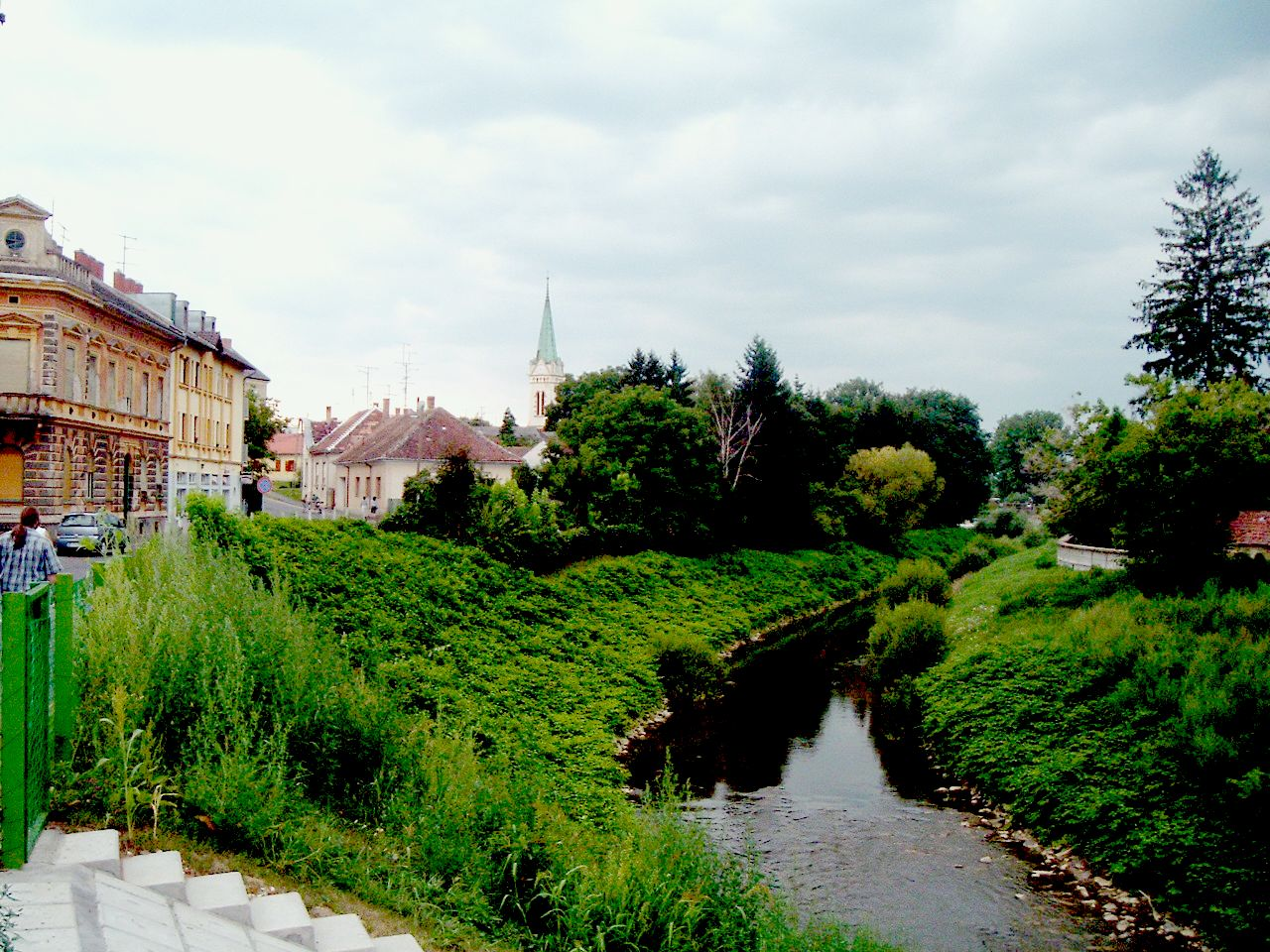
- Town centre with the Rába River

- Flag Coat of arms

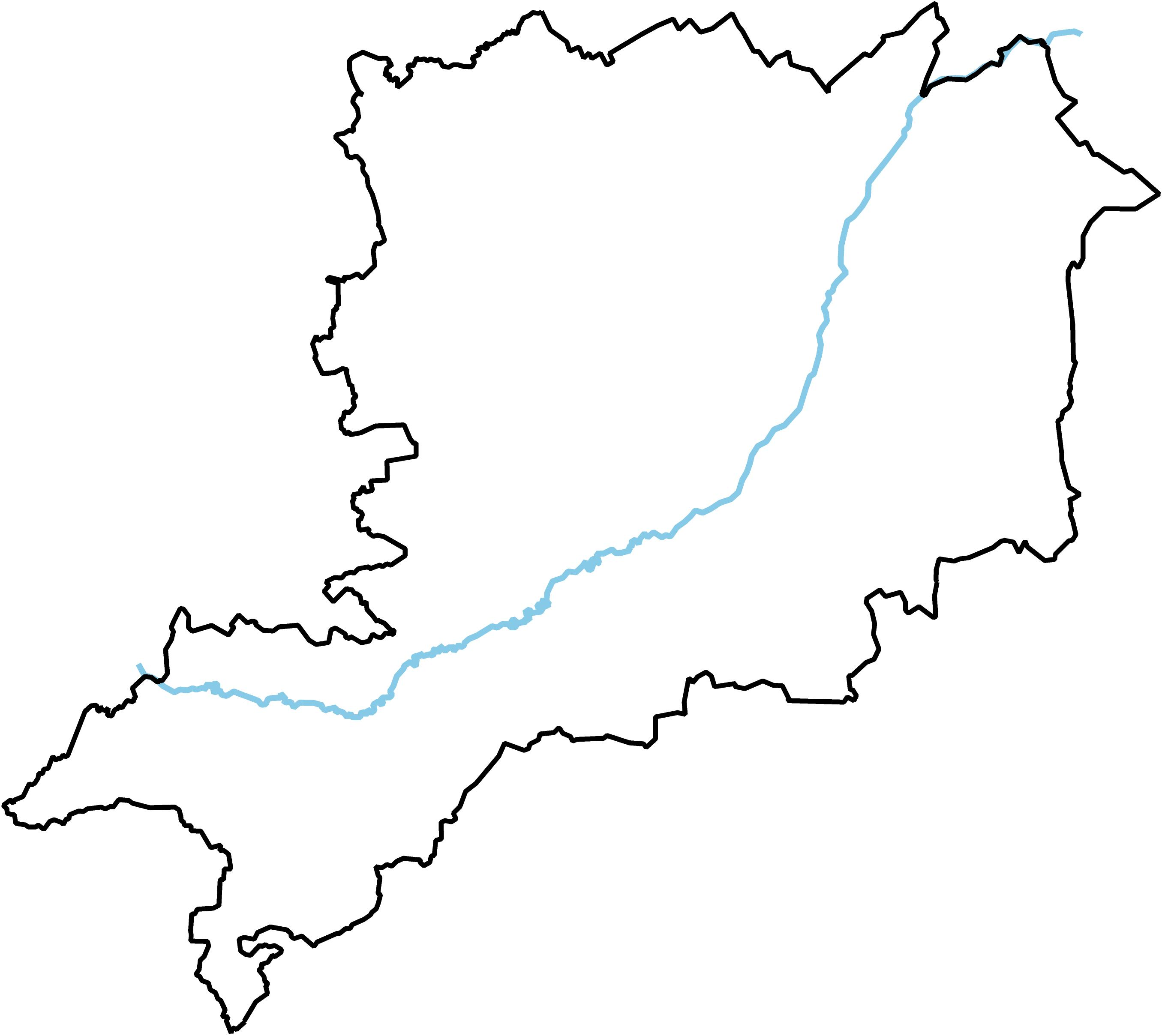
- Location of Szentgotthárd Szentgotthárd (Hungary)
- Coordinates: 46.94876°N 16.27907°E
- Country: Hungary
- County: Vas
- District: Szentgotthárd

Area
  - Total: 67.73 km^{2} (26.15 sq mi)

Population (2022)
  - Total: 8,696
  - Density: 128.4/km^{2} (332.5/sq mi)
- Time zone: UTC+1 (CET)
  - Summer (DST): UTC+2 (CEST)
- Postal code: 9970
- Area code: (+36) 94
- Website: www.szentgotthard.hu

Szentgotthárd (Hungarian pronunciation: [ˈsɛndɡothaːrd]; Slovene: Monošter) is the westernmost town of Hungary. It is situated on the Rába River near the Austrian border.

== History ==
The town took its name from, and grew up round, the Cistercian Szentgotthárd Abbey, founded here in 1183.

In 1664, it was the site of the Battle of Saint Gotthard, where an Austrian army led by Raimondo Montecuccoli defeated the Ottoman Empire so that the Turks had to agree to the Peace of Vasvár, which held until 1683.

A second Battle of Saint Gotthard in 1705 was a victory for Rákóczi's anti-Habsburg Hungarian rebels.

During World War II, Szentgotthárd was captured by Soviet troops of the 3rd Ukrainian Front on 31 March 1945 in the course of the Vienna Offensive.

The town is also considered as a centre of Rába Slovenes, the Slovenians living in the Rába region.

== Climate ==
Pápa's climate is classified as oceanic climate (Köppen Cfb). The annual average temperature is 10.0 °C (50.0 °F), the hottest month in July is 20.0 °C (68.0 °F), and the coldest month is −0.4 °C (31.3 °F) in January. The annual precipitation is 763.4 millimetres (30.06 in), of which July is the wettest with 94.2 millimetres (3.71 in), while January is the driest with only 26.3 millimetres (1.04 in). The extreme temperature throughout the year ranged from −18.5 °C (−1.3 °F) on January 24, 2006 to 39.1 °C (102.4 °F) on August 8, 2013.

Climate data for Pápa, 1991−2020 normals
Month	Jan	Feb	Mar	Apr	May	Jun	Jul	Aug	Sep	Oct	Nov	Dec	Year
Record high °C (°F)	19.0 (66.2)	22.4 (72.3)	23.4 (74.1)	28.5 (83.3)	32.1 (89.8)	35.1 (95.2)	38.8 (101.8)	39.1 (102.4)	33.1 (91.6)	25.3 (77.5)	22.6 (72.7)	16.6 (61.9)	39.1 (102.4)
Mean daily maximum °C (°F)	3.2 (37.8)	6.3 (43.3)	11.2 (52.2)	16.6 (61.9)	20.7 (69.3)	24.4 (75.9)	26.3 (79.3)	26.1 (79.0)	20.3 (68.5)	14.9 (58.8)	8.5 (47.3)	3.5 (38.3)	15.2 (59.4)
Daily mean °C (°F)	−0.4 (31.3)	1.5 (34.7)	5.6 (42.1)	10.5 (50.9)	14.7 (58.5)	18.3 (64.9)	20.0 (68.0)	19.7 (67.5)	14.8 (58.6)	9.9 (49.8)	5.0 (41.0)	0.2 (32.4)	10.0 (50.0)
Mean daily minimum °C (°F)	−3.3 (26.1)	−2.4 (27.7)	1.3 (34.3)	5.6 (42.1)	9.4 (48.9)	12.9 (55.2)	14.5 (58.1)	14.4 (57.9)	10.4 (50.7)	6.1 (43.0)	2.2 (36.0)	−2.3 (27.9)	5.7 (42.3)
Record low °C (°F)	−18.5 (−1.3)	−17.5 (0.5)	−16.2 (2.8)	−4.3 (24.3)	−0.3 (31.5)	1.7 (35.1)	6.5 (43.7)	4.6 (40.3)	1.0 (33.8)	−7.8 (18.0)	−9.5 (14.9)	−18.4 (−1.1)	−18.5 (−1.3)
Average precipitation mm (inches)	26.3 (1.04)	38.4 (1.51)	39.7 (1.56)	47.6 (1.87)	73.7 (2.90)	92.5 (3.64)	94.2 (3.71)	90.3 (3.56)	87.4 (3.44)	63.7 (2.51)	61.2 (2.41)	48.4 (1.91)	763.4 (30.06)
Average precipitation days (≥ 1.0 mm)	4.7	5.2	5.5	7.3	9.3	9.9	8.9	8.2	8.1	7.1	7.6	6.6	88.4
Average relative humidity (%)	85.2	76.7	70.1	67.2	71.9	72.9	72.7	75.4	82.3	85.9	88.9	88.2	78.1
Source: NOAA

== Notable people ==
- Ferenc Joachim (1882–1964), painter
- Alajos Drávecz (1866–1915), Slovenian ethnologist and writer
- Ágoston Pável (1886–1946), Hungarian Slovene writer and poet, graduated here
- János Brenner (1931–1957), Roman Catholic priest, died here
- Irén Pavlics (1934–2022), Hungarian Slovene author and editor
- Tibor Gécsek (born 1964), hammer thrower
- Krisztián Pars (born 1982), hammer thrower

== Twin towns – sister cities ==
Szentgotthárd is twinned with:

- Delle, France
- Dilovası, Turkey
- Frumoasa, Romania
- Izola, Slovenia
- Lendava, Slovenia
- Tarvisio, Italy
- Walldürn, Germany
