= Slovene March (Kingdom of Hungary) =

Historical area in southern Europe

The Slovene March or Slovene krajina (Slovene: Slovenska krajina, Hungarian: Vendvidék, Szlovenszka krajina, Szlovén krajina) was the traditional denomination of the Slovene-speaking areas of the Vas and Zala County in the Kingdom of Hungary from the late 18th century until the Treaty of Trianon in 1919. It comprised approximately two-thirds of modern Prekmurje, Slovenia, and the modern area between the current Slovenian-Hungarian border and the town of Szentgotthárd, where Hungarian Slovenes still live. In Hungarian, the latter area is still known as Vendvidék, which is the Hungarian denomination for the Slovene March, while in Slovene it is referred as Porabje (literally, 'the area along the Rába river').

It should not be confused with the medieval Slovene (or Windic) March of the Holy Roman Empire which was located in the present-day south-east Slovenia, roughly in the areas of the regions of Lower Carniola, White Carniola and Lower Sava Valley.

== Origins of the name ==
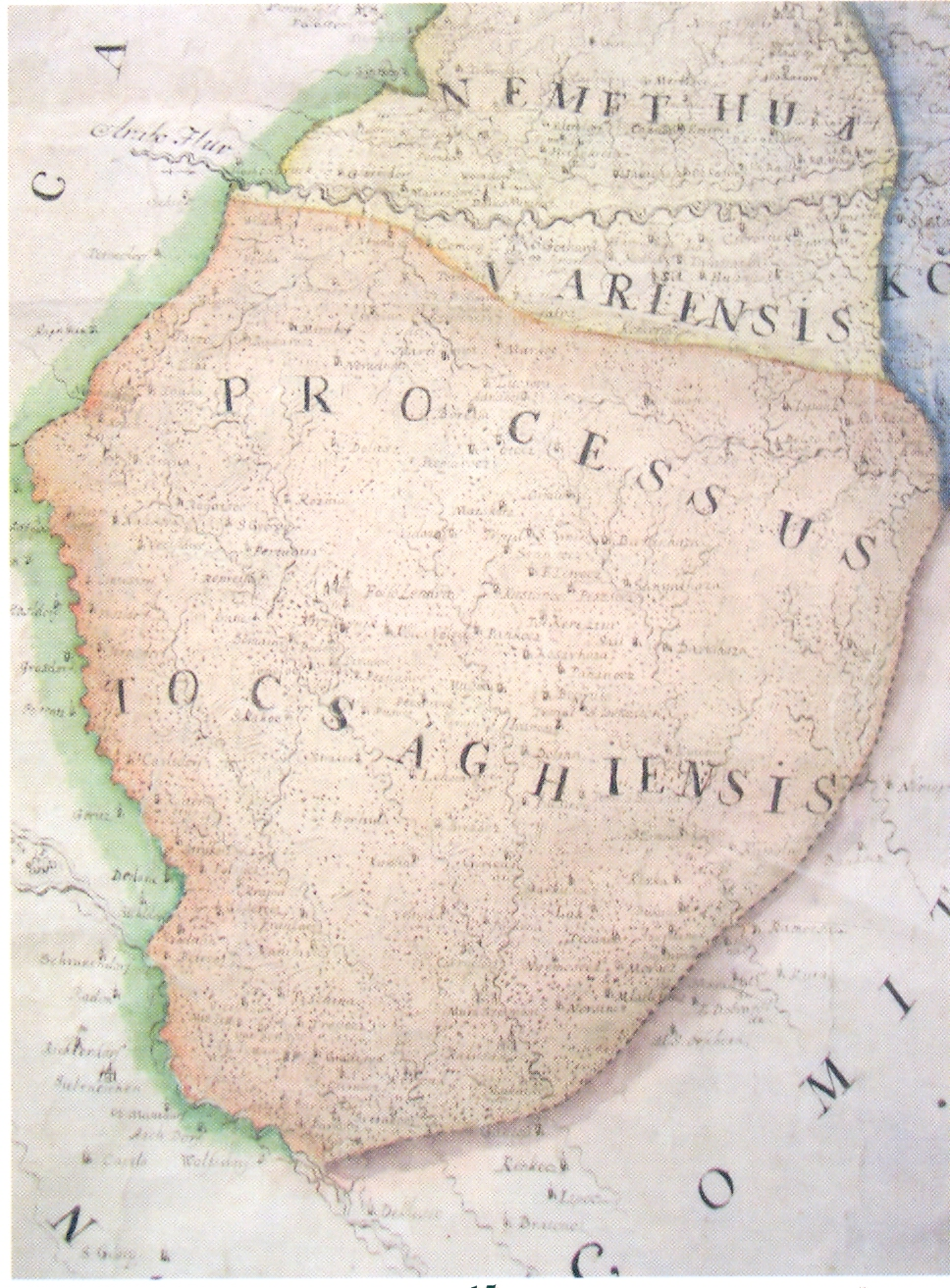
The Tótság district by 1790.

March, or "territory" (cognate to "mark"), is a word indicating a border county of a kingdom.

Since the 10th century, the Slovene-inhabited area between the Mura and Rába rivers was part of the Kingdom of Hungary. Most of this area was included in Vas County, while a smaller portion to the southeast (the areas between Lendava and Beltinci) belonged to Zala County. In the 12th century, the bishop of Győr founded a Slovene deanery district in his bishopric, under the name Tótság.

The name came from the Hungarian term Tót, which meant 'Slav'. In the local Slovene dialect, the ecclesiastical administrative unit became known as the Szlovenszka okroglina 'Slovene District'. In 1778, this area was transferred to the newly created Bishopric of Szombathely, and the first bishop, János Szily, created a district called Vendvidék 'Wendic March', from the Hungarian term Vend for the local Slovenes. Roman Catholic priests of the region called it Slovenska krajina, from the name of the local Slavic people, which in their local dialect, as in all Slovene dialects, is Slovenci or Slovénge.

== The quest for autonomy ==
In the late 19th century, the Hungarian authorities followed an assimilatory policy towards the minorities, pushing the Catholic majority of Slovenes, and their leaders József Borovnyák and Ferenc Ivanóczy, to aspire for autonomy of the Slovene March. In 1918, with the breakdown of the Austro-Hungarian Empire, the Slovene politicians in Prekmurje were confronted with the choice between continuing to be part of the newly established Hungarian Democratic Republic, seek for an autonomous entity, establish an independent state (Republic of the Slovene March), or join the new State of Slovenes, Croats and Serbs (Yugoslavia). The Hungarian republican leaders Mihály Károlyi and Oszkár Jászi were inclined to give a wide autonomy to the Slovene March. The Slovene governor József Klekl worked out a detailed program of autonomy together with Jászi. The proposal included an autonomous Slovene assembly in Murska Sobota, a regional defence unit, the establishment of a Slovene high school in Szentgotthárd, and the introduction of a trilingual administration in the territories of Szentgotthárd, Murska Sobota, Lendava and Őriszentpéter, with an equality between Prekmurje Slovene, Hungarian and German. The name of the proposed entity would be Slovene March (Slovenska krajina). On 19 January 1918, a convention was assembled in Beltinci, which proposed that the Slovene March became an autonomous territory in Slovenia and in Yugoslavia. Some Slovene politicians, such as Mihael Kuhar, Joško Godina, Ivan Jerič and the great Slovene politician Anton Korošec also felt that the idea of an independent Slovene March was possible. But Klekl disagreed and pushed for the inclusion of the Slovene March into Slovenia, which was then part of the Kingdom of Serbs, Croats and Slovenes.

Initially, the area was assigned to Hungary, but with the outbreak of the Hungarian Revolution of 1919, the situation changed dramatically. After a short interim of the Hungarian Soviet Republic, the Republic of Prekmurje was proclaimed in late May 1919 by the activist Vilmos Tkálecz. After less than two weeks, the tiny Republic was invaded by the Army of the Kingdom of Serbs, Croats and Slovenes that occupied the entire Prekmurje. With the Treaty of Trianon of June 1920, almost the totality of the area was assigned to the Kingdom of Serbs, Croats and Slovenes.

== After 1919 ==
After 1919, the name Slovene March fell into disuse. In the Kingdom of Yugoslavia, it was gradually replaced by the name Prekmurje, although most of the local elites preferred the old name Slovene March. The name however made little sense in the changed circumstances, since the region was not any more a Slovene-speaking peripheral area of Hungary, but was considered part of Slovenia. During the 1920s, the name Slovene March was thus replaced by 'March of the Mura' (Slovene: Murska krajina; Prekmurje dialect: Mörska krajina), which was used together with the denomination Prekmurje (literally 'the region over the Mura' or 'Trans-Mura'). After World War Two, this latter name prevailed, and all the others fell in disuse.

== See also ==
- Prekmurje
- Hungarian Slovenes
- Prekmurje Slovene
- Republic of Prekmurje

== Sources ==
- Források a Muravidék Történetéhez/Viri za zgodovino Prekmurja (Sources with the history of Prekmurje) 2. tome, Edit: László Mayer és András Molnár, Slovene translation: Magda Berden, Szombathely-Zalaegerszeg 2008. ISBN 978-963-7227-19-6
- Göncz László: A muravidéki magyarság 1918-1941 (Prekmurje Hungarians in 1918-1941)
- Tengely Adrienn: Az egyházak és a nemzetiségi kérdés 1918-ban
- Nemzetiségi viszonyok és nemzetiségi politika Magyarországon 1901-1919
