= Hungarian Slovenes =

Ethnic and linguistic group in Hungary

Hungarian Slovenes (Slovene: Madžarski Slovenci, Hungarian: Magyarországi szlovének) are an autochthonous ethnic and linguistic Slovene minority living in Hungary. The largest groups are the Rába Slovenes (Slovene: porabski Slovenci, dialectically: vogrski Slovenci, bákerski Slovenci, porábski Slovenci) in the Rába Valley in Hungary between the town of Szentgotthárd and the borders with Slovenia and Austria. They speak the Prekmurje Slovene dialect. Outside the Rába Valley, Slovenes mainly live in the Szombathely region and in Budapest.

== History ==
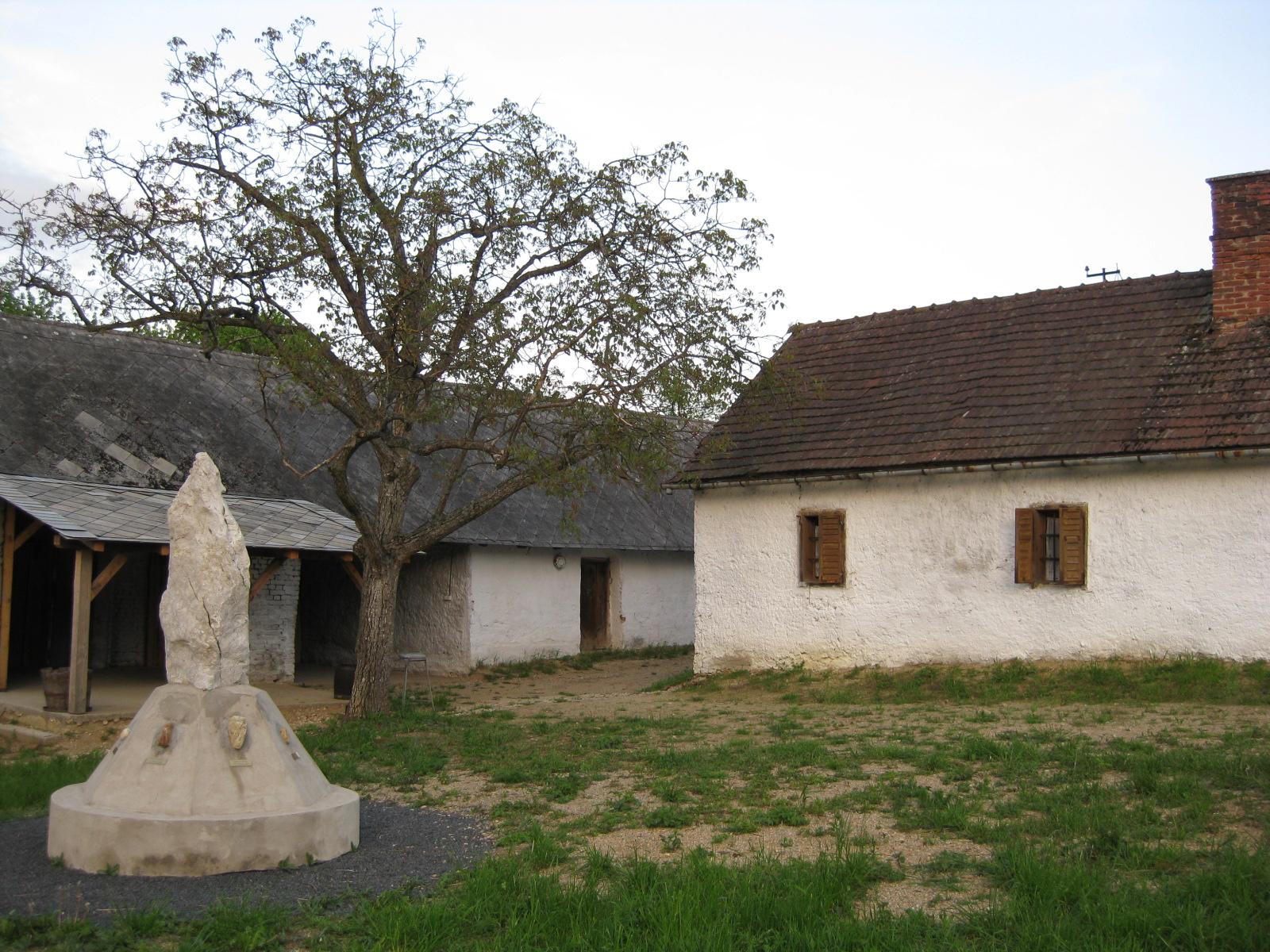
Monument to the Slovene culture in Hungary, made from a rock from Mount Triglav, in the village of Orfalu (Andovci), Vas County

The ancestors of modern Slovenes have lived in the western part of the Carpathian basin since at least the 6th century AD; their presence thus dates back to before the Magyars came into the region. They formed the Slavic Balaton Principality and were later incorporated in Arnulf's Kingdom of Carantania which extended to most of modern south-eastern Austria, southern Hungary and northern Croatia. After the Hungarian invasion in the late 9th century, most of the local Slavs were magyarized. Between the 11th and 12th century, the current linguistic and ethnic border between the Hungarian and Slovene people was established.

In the 10th century, the western border of the Kingdom of Hungary was fixed on the river Mura, so the region between the Mura and Rába rivers, known in Slovene as Slovenska krajina and in Hungarian as Vendvidék, inhabited by Slovenes, remained in Hungary. After World War One, there was a failed attempt by a small group of Hungarian Slovenes to acquire independence (see Slovene March and Mura Republic). In 1919, the majority of the region was annexed to the Kingdom of Serbs, Croats and Slovenes (later renamed to Yugoslavia), and became known under the name of Prekmurje. Only a small portion in Vas County, in the triangle between the northern border of Slovenia, the Rába River and Austria, remained in Hungary.

In 1920, the number of Slovenes that had remained in Hungary was estimated at around 7,000, but in the next decades many of them emigrated to other Hungarian cities, mostly to Budapest. In 2001, there were around 5,000 Slovenes in Hungary, of whom only around 3,000 remained in their original settlement zone in western Vas County, with others living mostly in larger urban areas.

== Language and terminology ==
The Hungarian Slovenes speak a specific dialect of Slovene (the Prekmurje Slovene), which is almost identical with the dialect spoken in the Prekmurje region of Slovenia. The traditional Magyar name for the Slovenes used to be Vendek or Vends; as a result, many Slovenes in Hungary accepted this name as a common denomination, although in their dialect, they always referred to themselves as Slovenes (Slovenci). In the last decades of the 19th century, and especially during the Horthy regime, the denomination "Wends" was used in order to emphasize the difference between the Hungarian Slovenes and other Slovenes, including attempts in creating a separate identity.

== Religion ==
Differently from their counterparts in Prekmurje, where there is a significant Lutheran minority, almost all Rába Slovenes are Roman Catholic, with religion playing an important role in their local traditions and communal life.

== Slovenes in Somogy ==
In the 17th and 18th century numerous Slovene families from Vas County settled down in Somogy County. According to research, there were 16 Slovene settlements in three country districts (Csurgó, Nagyatád, Marcali). The Slovenes came to Somogy County from what is now known as Prekmurje in two waves: the first was caused by Ottoman attacks around 1600 and the second took place in the 18th century, when they escaped persecution of their Protestant faith. In most cases, the Slovenes who immigrated to Somogy gradually became assimilated into the local Hungarian surroundings. Today, only a few indications that evoke the historic presence of Slovenes in Somogy County still exist. Among them, the most evident is the local cuisine.

The other most relevant reminiscence of Slovene presence is the wedding custom in Tarany, where the figure of the guest caller at weddings, still present in the local traditions of the Slovenes from the Rába Valley and those from the Prekmurje region in Slovenia, has been maintained. Both in Tarany and in the Rába Valley the guest caller is dressed in a robe decorated with knitting. In addition, he carries a stick with a hedgehog fur wrapped round its bottom. The customs at the deathbed, the vigil, and funerals are also similar. Furthermore, the descendants of the Slovenes in Somogy do not observe the typical Hungarian Easter Monday custom, in which men and boys douse women and girls with Eau de Cologne, otherwise typical in the region.

Whereas the Slovenes from the Rába Valley still maintain their language and culture, the consciousness of the inhabitants of Tarany about their ancestors is in constant decrease. In the 2001 Hungarian census, just 44 people declared themselves Slovene in the Somogy County.

== Frequent Slovene surnames in Hungary ==
- Bajzek (Bajzek)
- Doncsecz (Dončec)
- Gyécsek (Geček)
- Korpics (Korpič)
- Pavlics (Pavlič)
- Sulics (Šulič)
- Szvétecz (Svetec)

== Prominent Slovenes in Hungary ==
- Mihály Bakos - priest, author and educator
- Károly Doncsecz - potter
- Tibor Gécsek - hammer thrower
- József Kossics - writer, priest, ethnologist, linguist and historian
- István Küzmics - writer
- Ágoston Pável - poet, ethnologist, linguist and teacher
- Antal Rogán - politician
- Antal Stevanecz - teacher and writer

== See also ==
- Hungary–Slovenia relations
- Demographics of Hungary
- Hungarians in Slovenia
- List of Slovene writers and poets in Hungary
- Republic of Prekmurje
- Slovene Lands
- Slovenes in Somogy
- Wendish question
- Slovene March (Kingdom of Hungary)
- Prekmurje
- Prekmurje Slovenes

== Bibliography ==
- Mária Mukics: Changing World - The Hungarian Slovenes (Változó Világ - A magyarországi szlovének) Press Publica
