= List of Prekmurje Slovene literature =

This article is a list of literature that was published in the Prekmurje Slovene dialect.

- Ferenc Temlin: Mali katechismus (Small Catechism) the first printed book in Prekmurje Slovene, 1715
- Abeczedarium Szlowenszko (Slovene / Prekmurje Slovene ABC book) the first Prekmurje Slovene coursebook, author is unknown, 1725
- Mihály Szever Vanecsai: Réd zvelicsánsztva (Expectant salvation) in 1742
- István Küzmics: Vöre krsztsánszke krátki návuk (Small tenet of the Christian religion) 1754
- István Küzmics: Nouvi Zákon (New Testament) translation of the Bible, 1771
- Miklós Küzmics: Krátka summa velikoga katekizmusa (Small tenets of the great Catechism), the first Catholic catechism, 1780
- Miklós Küzmics: Szlovenszki silabikár (Slovene / Prekmurje Slovene Agenda) 1780
- Miklós Küzmics: Szvéti evangyeliomi (Holy Gospels) 1780
- Miklós Küzmics: Kniga molitvena (Prayerbook) 1783
- Mihály Bakos: Szlovenszki Abecedár (Slovene ABC book) in 1786
- Mihály Bakos: Nouvi Graduvál (New Agenda) in 1789
- Miklós Küzmics: ABC kni'zicza (ABC book) in 1790
- Miklós Küzmics: Sztároga i nouvoga Testamentoma szvéte histórie krátka summa (Small tenets of the holy history of Old and New Testaments) in 1796
- Mihály Bakos: Győrſzki Kátekizmus (Catechism of Raab) in 1796
- István Szijjártó: Mrtvecsne peszmi (Dead Hymns) in 1796
- István Szijjártó: Molitvi na ſztári ſzlovenſzki jezik (Prayers in the old Slovene language) 1797
- István Szijjártó(?): Sztarisinsztvo i zvacsinsztvo, 1807
- Mihály Barla: Diktomszke, verszuske i molitvene kni'zice (Small book of hymns, verses and prayers)
- Mihály Barla: Krscsanszke nôve peszmene knige (New Christian hymnbook), 1823
- József Kossics: Krátki návuk vogrszkoga jezika za zacsetníke (Small tenets of the Hungarian language), 1833
- György Czipott: Dühovni Áldovi (Ghostly Blessing), 1829
- István Lülik: Novi abeczedár (New ABC book), 1833
- János Kardos: D. Luther Martina máli kátekismus (Small catechism of Martin Luther), 1837
- János Kardos: Krátki návuk krsztsansztva (Small tenets of the Christianity), 1837
- János Kardos: Mála historia bibliszka (Small history of Bible), 1840
- József Kossics: Zobriszani Szloven i Szlovenka med Műrov i Rábov (Educated Slovene Man and Women between the Mura and Raba), 1845
- Sándor Terplán: Dvakrat 52 Bibliszke Historie (Twice 52 History from Bible), 1847
- János Kardos: Krsztsanszke czerkvene peszmi (Christian church hymns), 1848
- János Kardos: Krsztsanszke mrtvecsne peszmi (Christian dead hymns), 1848
- Sándor Terplán: Knige 'zoltárszke (Book of Psalms), 1848
- József Kossics: Zgodbe vogerszkoga králesztva (History of the Hungarian Kingdom), 1848
- József Kossics: Sztarine 'Seleznih ino Szalaszkih Szlovencov (Antiques of the Slovenes in Vas and Zala), 1845
- József Kossics: Jezus moje po'selejnye (Jesus my wish), 1851
- János Kardos: Pobo'zne molítvi (Church prayers), 1853
- János Kardos: ABC ali Návuk na píszajôcs-cstenyé (ABC book, or the Tenet of the writing and reading), 1867
- Szlovenszki ABCDAR (Slovene ABC book), 1868
- József Borovnyák: Dühovna hrána (Nutriment), 1868
- János Murkovics: Abecednik za katholičanske vesničke šolé (ABC-book for elementary schools), 1871
- István Szelmár: Zgodbe Sztároga i Nóvoga Zákona (Histories of the Old and New Testaments), 1873
- Imre Augustich: Prijátel (Friend), 1875-1879
- József Borovnyák: Szvéti Angel Csuvár (Holy Guardian Angel), 1875
- Imre Augustich: Návuk vogrszkoga jezika (Tenets of the Hungarian language), 1876
- Imre Augustich: Prirodopis s kepami (Natural history with images), 1878
- József Bagáry: Perve knige – čtenyá za katholičánske vesničke šolê (First book of the reading for the Catholic Elementary Schools), 1886
- József Pusztai–József Borovnjak–József Bagáry: Krscsánszko katholicsánszke cerkvene peszmi (Christian Catholic Hymnal), 1893
- Péter Kollár: Mála biblija z-kejpami (Small Bible with pictures), 1897
- József Szakovics: Katolicsanszki katekizmus z glávnimi zgodbami biblije (Small catechism with the main histories of Bible), 1907
- Iván Bassa: Katolicsanszki katekizmus za solare (Catholic catechism for Schoolchildren), 1909
- József Klekl sg.: Hodi k oltarskomi svestvi (Come on to Eucharist), 1910
- József Klekl sg.: Novine (Tidings), 1913-1941
- Števan Kühar: Mörszka krajina 1890-1963
