= Prekmurje Slovene =

Slovene dialect

- Prekmurje dialect, Eastern Slovene, Wendish
- prekmürščina, prekmörščina, panonska slovenščina, prekmurščina, prekmursko narečje
- Native to: Slovenia, Hungary and emigrant groups in various countries
- Ethnicity: Prekmurje Slovenes
- Native speakers: (undated figure of 110,000)
- Language family: Indo-European: Balto-Slavic; Slavic; South Slavic; Western South Slavic; Slovene; Pannonian; Prekmurje Slovene
- Writing system: Latin script

Language codes
- ISO 639-3: –
- Glottolog: prek1239
- Map of Slovenian dialects. Prekmurje Slovene is marked in dark yellow at the top right.

Prekmurje Slovene, also known the Prekmurje dialect or Eastern Slovene, occasionally Prekmurian (Slovene: prekmurščina, prekmursko narečje; Hungarian: vend nyelv, muravidéki nyelv; Prekmurje Slovene: prekmürski jezik, prekmürščina, prekmörščina, prekmörski jezik, panonska slovenščina), is the language of Prekmurje in Eastern Slovenia, and a variety of the Slovene language. As a part of the Pannonian dialect group, it is spoken in the Prekmurje region of Slovenia and by the Hungarian Slovenes in the Vas County in western Hungary. It is used in private communication, liturgy and publications by authors from Prekmurje as well as in television, radio and newspapers. It is closely related to other Slovene dialects in neighboring Slovene Styria as well as to Kajkavian with which it is mutually intelligible to a considerable degree, and forms a dialect continuum with other South Slavic languages.

Prekmurje Slovene is part of the Pannonian dialect group (Slovene: panonska narečna skupina), which is also known as the eastern Slovene dialect group (vzhodnoslovenska narečna skupina). Prekmurje Slovene shares many common features with the dialects of Haloze, Slovenske Gorice, and Prlekija, with which it is completely mutually intelligible. It is also closely related to the Kajkavian dialects of Croatian, although mutual comprehension is difficult. Prekmurje Slovene, especially its more traditional version spoken by the Hungarian Slovenes, is not readily understood by speakers from central and western Slovenia, whereas speakers from eastern Slovenia (Lower Styria) have much less difficulty understanding it. The early 20th-century philologist Ágoston Pável stated that Prekmurje Slovene is actually a major, independent dialect of Slovene, from which it differs mostly in the aspects of stress, intonation, the softening of consonants and—as a result of the lack of linguistic reform—in the striking dearth of modern vocabulary and that it has preserved many older features from Proto-Slavic.

== Geographical distribution ==
Prekmurje Slovene is spoken by approximately 110,000 speakers worldwide. of which 80,000 in Prekmurje, 20,000 throughout in Slovenia (especially in Maribor and Ljubljana) and 10,000 in other countries. In Hungary, it is used by the Slovene-speaking minority in the Vas County in and around the town of Szentgotthárd. Other speakers of the dialect live in other Hungarian towns, particularly Budapest, Szombathely, Bakony, and Mosonmagyaróvár. The dialect was also spoken in Somogy (especially in the village of Tarany), but it has nearly disappeared in the last two centuries. There are some speakers in Austria, Germany, the United States, and Argentina.

== Status ==
Nouvi Zákon (New Testament) by István Küzmics. The Prekmurje language was standardized with this book.

Prekmurje Slovene has a defined territory and body of literature, and it is one of the few Slovene dialects in Slovenia that are still spoken by all strata of the local population. Some speakers have claimed that it is a separate language. Prominent writers in Prekmurje Slovene, such as Miklós Küzmics, István Küzmics, Ágoston Pável, József Klekl Senior, and József Szakovics, have claimed that it is a language, not simply a dialect. Evald Flisar, a writer, poet, and playwright from Prekmurje (Goričko), states that people from Prekmurje "talk in our own language". It also has a written standard and literary tradition, both of which were largely neglected after World War II. There were attempts to publish in it more broadely in the 1990s, primarily in Hungary, and there has been a revival of literature in Prekmurje Slovene since the late 1990s.

Others consider Prekmurje Slovene a regional language, without denying that it is part of Slovene. The linguist Janko Dular has characterized Prekmurje Slovene as a "local standard language" for historical reasons, followed by the Prekmurje writer Feri Lainšček. However, Prekmurje Slovene is not recognized as a language in Slovenia or Hungary, nor does it enjoy any legal protection under the European Charter for Regional or Minority Languages. In 2016, the General Maister Society (Društvo General Maister) proposed that primary schools offer education in the Prekmurje Slovene. Some regional politicians and intellectuals advocate Prekmurje Slovene.

Alongside Resian, Prekmurje Slovene is the only Slovene dialect with a literary standard that has had a different historical development than the rest of the Slovene ethnic territory. For centuries, it has been used as a language of education as well as in the press and liturgy. The historical Hungarian name for the Slovenes living within the borders of the Kingdom of Hungary (as well as for the Slovenes in general) was Vendek, or the Wends. In the 18th and 19th centuries, Prekmurje authors used to designate this language variety as sztári szlovenszki jezik 'old Slovene'. Both then and now, it is also referred to as the "Slovene language between the Mura and Raba" (Slovenščina med Muro in Rabo; Slovenski jezik med Mürov i Rábov).

Prekmurje Slovene is widely used in the regional media (Murski Val Radio, Porabje, Slovenski utrinki), films, literature. The youth write SMS messages and web comments in their local tongue. In Prekmurje and Hungary, several streets, shops, hotels, etc. bear Prekmurje Slovene names. In the 2012 protests in Slovenia in Murska Sobota, the protesters used Prekmurje Slovene banners. It is the liturgical language in the Lutheran and Pentecostal churches and in the Catholic Church of Hungarian Slovenes. Marko Jesenšek, a professor at the University of Maribor, has stated that the functionality of Prekmurje Slovene is limited, but "it lives on in poetry and journalism."

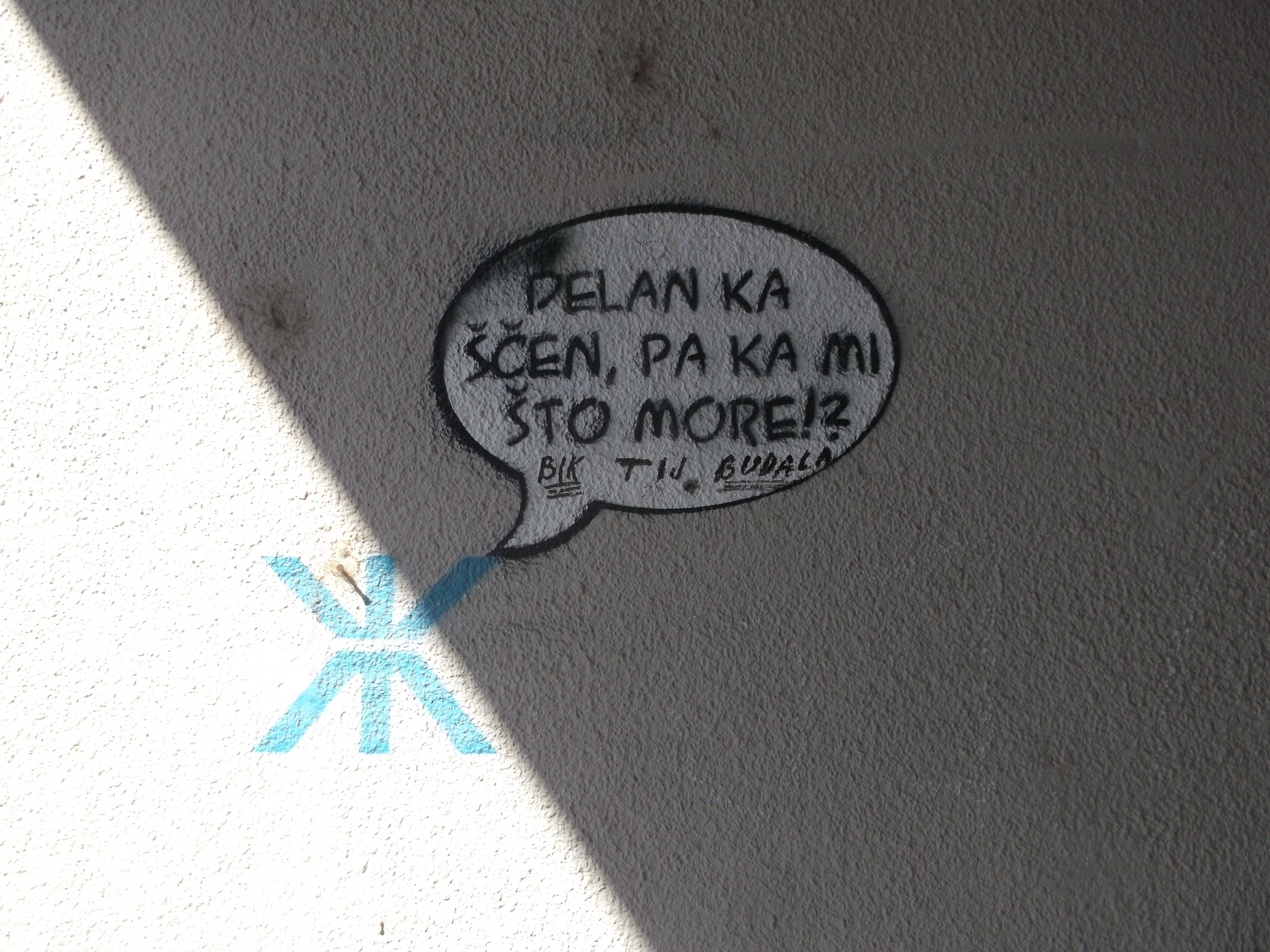
Prekmurje Slovene graffiti in Murska Sobota.

Scholars in modern linguistics, dialectology and other fields consistently use the term prekmurščina, denoting it as a language. The Slovene affix -ščina signifies a language (e.g. nemščina 'German'), dialect (e.g., celjščina 'Celje dialect'), or manner of speaking (e.g. latovščina 'jargon').

== Name ==
In 1988, Slovene English-language specialist Stanko Klinar declared that it is grammatically correct to use the name Prekmurian (alongside forms like Ljubljanian and Mariboran).

The term Prekmurian first appeared in a scientific publication in 1977. Previous scientific texts in the 1990s and 2000s mostly used the terms Prekmurje Slovene, Prekmurje language, Prekmurje dialect etc. (e.g. Greenberg). Nowadays, the most popular term in scientific texts is Prekmurian.

== Dialects ==
Prekmurje Slovene is used as:

- The dialect of the hilly Goričko, in northern Prekmurje, particularly in the villages of Grad, Gornji Petrovci, Križevci, Kuzma, Kuzma, Rogašovci, Šalovci, and Mačkovci.
  - The Raba March (Porabje) subdialect in Hungary, a variety of the Goričko dialect.
- The dialect of the lowland Ravensko in Central Prekmurje, particularly in the villages of Puconci, Cankova, Bogojina, Bakovci, Tišina, Petanjci, Moravske Toplice, and Rakičan.
  - The Murska Sobota subdialect, i.e. the speech of the town of Murska Sobota; it is a variety of the Ravensko dialect.
- The Dolinsko subdialect in South Prekmurje, particularly in the villages of Beltinci, Bratonci, Črenšovci, Velika Polana, Turnišče, Žižki, Renkovci, Bistrica (Dolnja, Gornja and Srednja). It is also named the Marko (markovsko or markasto) dialect due to the prevalence of the personal name Marko (Mark) in the past.

== History ==
=== Early history ===
The Prekmurje Slovene developed from the language of the Carantanian Slavs who settled around Balaton in the 9th century. Due to the political and geographical separation from other Slovene dialects (unlike most of the contemporary Slovenia, which was part of the Holy Roman Empire, Prekmurje was under the authority of the Kingdom of Hungary for almost a thousand years), the Prekmurje Slovene acquired many specific features. Separated from the cultural development of the remainder of ethnic Slovene territory, the Slovenes in Hungary gradually forged their own specific culture and also their own literary language.

in the 16th and 17th centuries, a few Slovene Protestant pastors fled from Carniola and Styria to Hungary. They brought along the Bible of Jurij Dalmatin, which was used in Felsőszölnök. and Postil of Primož Trubar, which was used in Gornji Petrovci. The Hungarian Slovenes found it difficult to understand the language of these books.

By the 16th century, a theory linking the Hungarian Slovenes to the ancient Vandals became popular. Accordingly, Prekmurje Slovene was frequently designated in Hungarian Latin documents as the Vandalian language (Latin: lingua vandalica, Hungarian: Vandál nyelv).

For a long time, the circumstances of the two-tier development of the Slovene language was ignored in Slovenian linguistics and science. The current form of the standard Slovene language only developed in the 19th century. Prior to this, the Slovene language norm was twofold: the Central Slovene language (mostly in Carniola) and the Eastern Slovene language (in Styria and Hungary).

For a brief period, there were also two variants of the Eastern Slovene language: the Prekmurje Slovene and the Eastern Styrian Slovene (in the regions of Ormož, Ljutomer and Lenart of Slovene Hills).

The literary traditions of the Prekmurje Slovene developed during the Protestant Reformation: mostly manuscript hymnals with religious hymns, psalms from the 16th and 17th century, and a contract from 1643. The standard language emerged at the beginning of the 18th century and developed slowly. The standard Prekmurje Slovene followed homogeneous grammatical rules and phonetic characteristics. An example of this is the use of the wovels ö or ü and diphthongs in writing.

Manuscripts were also written in the Eastern Styrian Slovene language. Printed books in this language were also published. However, there were no homogeneous grammatical or phonologycal forms in this language variant. Styrian Slovene authors had thoroughly different ideas about the standard language. The Styrian Slovene literary language eventually ceased to exist and was replaced by the Central Slovene language.

=== 18th century ===
The first book in the Prekmurje Slovene appeared in 1715 and was written by the Lutheran pastor Ferenc Temlin. The most important authors from this period were the Lutheran pastor István Küzmics and the Roman Catholic priest Miklós Küzmics who set the standard for the Prekmurje regional standard language in the 18th century.

István translated the entire New Testament into Prekmurje Slovene (Nouvi Zákon 1771). István was born in Ravensko (lowland) and based his standard language on the Ravensko dialect of Prekmurje Slovene, just like it was used in old regional manuscripts. He also expanded the language with elements from the Goričko (highland) dialect.

Who will prevent those Slovenians who live between the Mura and the Raba the right to translate these holy books into the language that they understand God talking to them through prophets and epistles? God ordaines them to read these books to get prepared for the salvation in the faith of Jesus Christ. However, they cannot receive this from Trubar's, Dalmatin's, Francel's, or other translations (versio). The language of our Hungarian Slovenes differs from other languages and has unique characteristics. There are differences already in the said translations.

— István Küzmics, József Torkos, Predgovor, Nouvi Zákon (1771)

Miklós Küzmics was born in Goričko but he followed István's language scheme. He adopted further elements from the Goričko and Dolinsko dialects. Miklós wrote several books, which were reprinted in the 20th century. His prayer book (Kniga molitvena, 1783) became very popular. His text and coursebook (ABC Kni'sicza, 1790) was used for decades in Slovene schools.

Important standardization work in Prekmurje Lutheran literature was also performed by István Szijjártó and Mihály Bakos.

Versus Vandalici, the first literary poem in the Prekmurje Slovene, was written in 1774.

=== 19th century ===
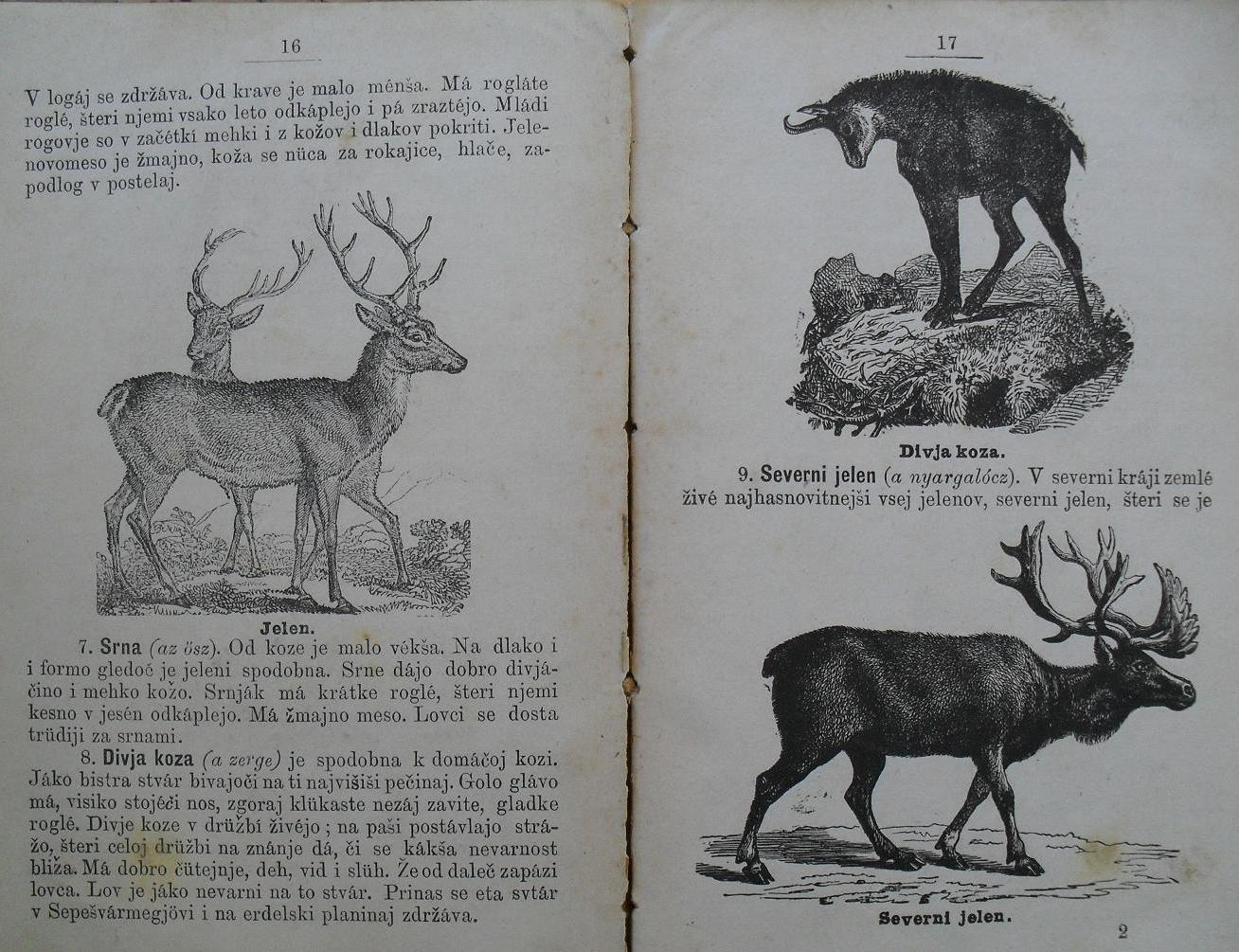
Natural history in the Prekmurje Slovene. The scientific vocabulary in the Prekmurje Slovene was codified by Imre Augustich's Prirodopis (1878).

In 1823, Mihály Barla wrote a new set of rules for writing the Prekmurje Slovene. He introduced three new characters to denote diphthongs: ô (ou), ê (ej), and â (aj). The new orthography was put forward in two new hymnals, Diktomszke, versuske i molitvene kni'zicze (1820) and Krscsanszke nôve peszmene knige (1823). In 1820, a Lutheran teacher named István Lülik wrote a new textbook Nôvi abeczedár, which was published three times (1853, 1856, 1863). His book used Barla's orthography even though it was only used in the Prekmurje Lutheran literature.

Lülik wrote the first grammar of the Prekmurje Slovene, but it was never printed.

The first secular book in the Prekmurje Slovene was a ceremony book for weddings (Sztarisinsztvo i zvacsinsztvo. 1804; the author is probably István Szijjártó).

The Catholic priest József Kossics used the Prekmurje Slovene in new functions. He didn't write religious books but books on history, grammar and etiquette. His stance was in line with the tendency for national encouragement.

The Lutheran pastor Sándor Terplán translated the Psalms (Knige 'zoltárszke. 1848) and wrote new schoolbooks.

János Kardos translated numerous poems of Sándor Petőfi, János Arany and a few Hungarian poets. He drafted new schoolbooks, for ex. Nôve knige cstenyá za vesznícski sôl drügi zlôcs. Kardos approached the language in a conservative manner: he was not open for Slovene or Croatian and stuck to archaic elements. Kárdos' purism was very similar to the purism of Fran Levstik in Carniola.

Unlike Kardos, József Borovnyák was a Catholic priest who adapted standard Prekmurje Slovene to the standard Slovene. Borovnyák also contributed to the functional development of the Prekmurje Slovene, e.g. with his political brochure Máli politicsni vodnik (1869).

In 1875, the poet, writer, translator and journalist Imre Augustich established the first Prekmurje Slovene newspaper. Prijátel (The Friend). Then he wrote a new Hungarian–Prekmurje Slovene grammar (Návuk vogrszkoga jezika, 1876) and translated works of Hungarian poets and writers.

Augustich approached the standard Slovene, but at first he retained the Hungarian alphabet. Later he introduced the Gaj alphabet in the Prijátel and in a new coursebook Prirodopis s kepami, the first natural science book in the Prekmurje Slovene.

In 1871, József Bagáry wrote the first schoolbook that used the Gaj alphabet (Perve knige – čtenyá za katholičánske vesničke šolê). The Magyarization policy tried to exclude it from school usage but it enjoyed such a popularity in schools that it was reprinted in 1886.

At the turn of the 19th and 20th centuries, the terms "Wends" and "Wendish language" were promoted mostly by pro-Hungarians to emphasize the difference between the Hungarian Slovenes and other Slovenes, attempting to create a separate ethnic identity for them.

The Prekmurje Slovene language kept up with the changes of the modern era and was able to reinvent itself on its own or by adopting innovations from the (Central) Slovene and Croatian languages. The assertion that the Prekmurje Slovene slowly declined with modernization in the mid-19th century is not credible. It is contradicted by the first science books (by Kossics and Augustich) and the first news publications.

=== 20th century ===
In 1908, Albert Apponyi, the Hungarian minister of education and religion, implemented a new act that demanded the school subjects to be taught in Hungarian language in all schools of the Kingdom of Hungary. The purpose of the act was to magyarize national minorities. School education in Prekmurje Slovene ceased.

In 1914–1918, József Klekl, a politician and later a congressman in Belgrade, reformed the Prekmurje Slovene literary language by using elements of the Croatian and Slovene languages. In 1923, a new prayerbook titled Hodi k oltarskomi svesti (Come on to the Eucharist) was written in the Gaj alphabet.

In 1919, the majority of Prekmurje became part of the Kingdom of Serbs, Croats and Slovenes, and Slovene and Serbo-Croatian replaced Hungarian as the languages of education and administration. Prekmurje Slovene remained the language of literature, journalism and church service.

Even though education in Prekmurje Slovene did not resume in Yugoslavia (the teaching languages were Serbo-Croatian and standard Slovene), Prekmurje Slovene flourished as a language of news in the 1920s and 1930s. It was used to write articles in the periodicals Novine, Marijin list, Marijin ograček, the calendar Kalendar Srca Jezušovoga, the Lutheran Düševni list and Evangeličanski kalendari. Slovene emigrants from Prekmurje also had their own weekly in the United States between 1921 and 1954 written in the Prekmurje Slovene: Amerikanszki Szlovencov Glász (American Windish Voice).

József Szakovics was actively involved in cultivating the Prekmurje Slovene with his books and articles in newspapers and calendars and with reprints of the oldest book of Miklós Küzmics. The prominent Prekmurje writer Miško Kranjec also wrote in Prekmurje Slovene.

In this period, several works of the world literature were also translated into the Prekmurje Slovene, e.g. Molière's Le Médecin malgré lui.

János Berke started to collect the vocabulary for the first Prekmurje Slovene dictionary, which was then published in part by János Fliszár under the title Vogrszki-vendiski rêcsnik in 1922. The entire dictionary with fifty thousand terms has been preserved in manuscript.

In 1941, the Hungarian Army occupied the area of Prekmurje, and it aimed to eradicate Prekmurje Slovene and standard Slovene by 1945, assisted by the Slovene irredentist Mikola.

After 1945, the Communist Yugoslavia banned the printing of books and newspapers in the Prekmurje Slovene, and only standard Slovene and Serbo-Croatian were used in administration and education. In Hungary, the dictator Mátyás Rákosi banned every minority language and deported the Slovenes to the Hungarian Plain.

There has been a significant uptick of interest in the Prekmurje Slovene and cultural heritage since Slovenia became independent. Several associations, publishers, and self-published prints of both old and new books have appeared in the Prekmurje Slovene.

=== 21st century ===
In the 21st century, the Prekmurje Slovene has become more visible in Slovenian cultural life. It can be more frequently heard in different interviews on TV channels and radios (Murski val, Slovenski utrinki). Today, the Prekmurje Slovene is also written on public signs, such as some shop signs, which attests to its growing use in the region.

In 2018, a translation of Exupery's The Little Prince was published in Prekmurje Slovene.

In 2018, the singer and songwriter Nika Zorjan wrote the Prekmurje Slovene version of Mariah Carey's All I Want for Christmas Is You under the title Fse ka bi za Božič. On an occasion she opined: "The Prekmurje people are often local patriots and sometimes we say with pride: This is Prekmurje Slovene, not Slovene."

The popular Slovenian singer-songwriter Vlado Kreslin also sings in the Prekmurje Slovene. His website is fully available in Prekmurje Slovene.

== Phonology ==
The vowel ö occurs only in a few words as a variant of closed e or ö. It has plain a in long stressed syllables and rounded a in short stressed and unstressed syllables in the Goričko (upland) and Ravensko (lowland) dialects. The relationship is reversed in the lower Dolinsko dialect where the long stressed a is rounded.

Long vowels and most diphthongs occur only stressed in syllables. If the stress shifts the vowel shortens and the diphthong usually loses its glide, e.g.: Nom. Boug; Gen. Bogá.

=== Diphthongs ===
The diphthong ej (ei) is a short, closed e followed by a shorter, less fully articulated i, e.g.: dejte (child), bejžati (run), pejnezi (money), mlejko (milk), bejli (white).

The diphthong ou consists of a short o and a short, less fully articulated u, e.g.: rouka (hand), nouga (foot), goloub (dove), rour (chimney), gospoud (lord).

Prekmurje Slovene is very rich in the diphthongs ej and ou. Various Slovene dialects feature these diphthongs, but they differ phonetically from the diphthongs of Prekmurje Slovene. The diphthongs ou and ej were written in the old standard Prekmurje Slovene with separate signs ê and ô, but they were only used in the books and newspapers of the Lutheran Slovenes.

The diphthong ou in the northern Goričko subdialects (mostly near the Rába) and in the settlements along the Hungarian-Slovene border is reduced to au. The Ravensko dialect and some Goričko subdialects have diphthongs üj or öj.

Diphthongs in open syllables, when part of polysyllabic words, separate into their components, e.g. nominative sou (salt), genitive soli or nominative krau (king) and genitive krala.

=== Vowel alternations ===
a>e
Unstressed a and a in a diphthong with i or j often sound like an open e. This system is most typical of the lower Lowland (Dolinsko) dialect, e.g. eli (or) (Ravensko, Goričko, Standard Slovene: ali), nezaj (back) (Ravensko, Goričko, Standard Slovene: nazaj), dele (forward) (Ravensko, Goričko: dale, Standard Slovene: dalje).

o>i
This is a sporadic dissimilation and assimilation. e.g.: visiki (high, Standard Slovene visok).

o>e
In inflected forms, a soft consonant (c, č, š, ž, j) is usually followed by o instead of e in Standard Slovene. For example: z noužicon (Standard Slovene z nožem 'with knife'), s konjon (Standard Slovene s konjem 'with horse'). In neuter nominative singular and accusative o is also heard instead of e, e.g.: mojo delo, našo delo, (Standard Slovene moje delo, naše delo 'my work', 'our work'). Innovative e may be only heard in the eastern subdialects of the Dolinsko dialect, mostly along the Slovene-Croatian border (near the Međimurje).

o>u
The diactric ŭ refers to the non-frontedness of the vowel. For ex. un, una Standard Slovene on, ona (he, she). The diactric u occurs even more frequently in the Dolinsko dialect, e.g. kunj (horse) (Ravensko, Goričko, Standard Slovene: konj), Marku (Mark) (Ravensko, Goričko, Standard Slovene Marko).

a>o
For example zakoj (why) (Standard Slovene zakaj).

u>ü
The historical u is pronounced almost without exception as ü and it is also spelled this way. For example küp (mound) (Standard Slovene kup), küpiti (purchase) (Standard Slovene kupiti), düša (soul) (Standard Slovene duša), lüknja (slit) (Standard Slovene luknja), brüsiti (facet) (Standard Slovene brusiti).

In words starting with a v, there are mixed forms, whereas Standard Slovene retains u, for example vüjo (ear) (Standard Slovene uho), vujti (escapes) (Standard Slovene uiti).

The u derived from the earlier ol preceding a consonant does not convert into ü, for ex. pun (full) (Standard Slovene poln), dugi (long) (Standard Slovene dolg), vuna (wool) (Standard Slovene volna), vuk (wolf) (Standard Slovene volk).

=== Consonant alternations ===
Z prior to nj often sounds like ž, for example ž njin (with him) (Standard Slovene z njim).

k>c
For example tenko, natenci (thin, thinly) (Standard Slovene tanko, natanko). This type of alternation was even more frequent in the old Prekmurje Slovene, for example vuk, vucke, vuci (wolf, wolves) (Standard Slovene volk, volki, Croatian vuk, vuci). Today it is preserved in the speech of the elderly in Goričko and the subdialect of Hungarian Slovenes.

m>n
The final m in Prekmurje Slovene almost always sounds like n (just like in other Pannonian Slovene dialects or in the Chakavian). For example znan (I know) (Standard Slovene znam), man (I have) (Standard Slovene imam), tan (there) (Standard Slovene tam), vüzen (Easter) (Standard Slovene vuzem z zlaton (with gold) (Standard Slovene z zlatom), ran (building) (Standard Slovene hram). Exceptions: grm (bush), doum (home), tram (strut) etc.

The change of m>n can also occur in a middle position, preceding consonants; for example: Nom. vüzen, Gen. vüzma.

nj>n
The n has developed from an nj in final or medial positions, for example ogen (fire) (Standard Slovene ogenj), kniga (book) (Standard Slovene knjiga). Nj reappears in declined forms, for example ognja (Genitive).

lj>l
The hard lj (ł) has totally disappeared from Prekmurje Slovene, for example: klüč (key) (Standard Slovene ključ), lübiti, lübezen (love) (Standard Slovene ljubiti, ljubezen), grable (rake) (Standard Slovene grablje).

h>j or ∅
In certain regions and in certain positions it is still present as h.

1. In initial positions before a vowel or syllable forming r its usage is ambiguous and regionally variable. For example hüdi, üdi (evil) (Standard Slovene hud). In noun iža (house) (Standard Slovene hiša) h is absent in all Prekmurje dialects.
2. in the middle position between vowels where h is present, a j has replaced it, for example küjati (cook) (Standard Slovene kuhati).
3. G usually disappears if followed by consonants and in the middle position preceded by consonants, for example lad (cold) (Standard Slovene hlad), sprneti (decay) (Standard Slovene trohneti).
4. H in the final syllable and in medium position followed by consonants usually turns into j, which merges with the preceding vowel to form a diphthong,; for example lejko (perhaps, easily) (Standard Slovene lahko).
5. In the final position, preceded by a vowel, it changes into j,; for example grej (sin) (Standard Slovene greh), krüj (bread) (Standard Slovene kruh).

There are a few exceptions: shajati (to go along with something), zahtejvati (demand) etc.

bn>vn
For example drouvno (tiny) (Standard Slovene drobno).

p>f
For example ftic, ftič, ftica (bird) (Standard Slovene ptic, ptič, ptica).

j>d
For example žeden (thirsty) (Standard Slovene žejen).

hč>šč
For example nišče (nobody) (Standard Slovene nihče).

kt>št
For example što (who) (Standard Slovene: kdo).

ljš>kš
For example boukši (better, right) (Standard Slovene boljši).

dn (dnj)>gn (gnj)
For example gnes, gnjes (today) (Standard Slovene danes). Nom. škegen (barn), Gen. škegnja.

t>k
Mainly preceding an l.

1. In the initial position, for example kmica (darkness), klačiti (to tread) (Standard Slovene tlačiti), kusti (thick, fat) (Standard Slovene tolst).
2. In the medial position, for example mekla (broom) (Standard Slovene metla).
3. In the final position, soldak (soldier).

== Orthography ==
Historically, Prekmurje Slovene was not written in the Bohorič alphabet used by Slovenes in Inner Austria, but in the Hungarian alphabet. János Murkovics's textbook (1871) was the first book to use Gaj's Latin alphabet.

Before 1914: Aa, Áá, Bb, Cc, Cscs, Dd, Ee, Éé, Êê, Ff, Gg, Gygy, Hh, Ii, Jj, Kk, Ll, Lyly, Mm, Nn, Nyny, Oo, Ôô, Öö, Őő, Pp, Rr, Szsz, Ss, Tt, Uu, Üü, Űű, Vv, Zz, Zszs.

After 1914: Aa, Áá, Bb, Cc, Čč, Dd, Ee, Éé, Êê, Ff, Gg, Gjgj, Hh, Ii, Jj, Kk, Ll, Ljlj, Mm, Nn, Njnj, Oo, Ôô, Öö, Pp, Rr, Ss, Šš, Tt, Uu, Üü, Vv, Zz, Žž.

== Morphology ==
Nouns in Prekmurje Slovene can be masculine, feminine or neuter, like in Standard Slovene. Nouns, adjectives and pronouns have three numbers: singular, dual, and plural, just like in Standard Slovene.

=== Feminine ===
Feminine nouns ending in a.

Declension patterns of feminine nouns ending in a (Prekmurje Slovene)
Grammatical case\Number	Singular	Dual	Plural
Nom.	-a	-i/ej	-e
Gen.	-e	-∅/ej	-∅
Dat.	-i/ej	-ama	-an
Ac.	-o/ou	-i/ej	-e
Loc.	-i/ej	-ama/aj	-aj
Inst.	-of(v)/-ouf(v)	-ama	-ami

Declension patterns of feminine nouns ending in a (Standard Slovene)
Grammatical case\Number	Singular	Dual	Plural
Nom.	-a	-i	-e
Gen.	-e	-∅	-∅
Dat.	-i	-ama	-am
Ac.	-o	-i	-e
Loc.	-i	-ah	-ah
Inst.	-o	-ama	-ami

Feminine nouns ending with a consonant.

Declension patterns of feminine nouns ending in a (Prekmurje Slovene)
Grammatical case\Number	Singular	Dual	Plural
Nom.	-∅	-i/ej	-i
Gen.	-i	-i/ej	-i
Dat.	-i	-ama	-an
Ac.	-∅	-i/ej	-i
Loc.	-i	-ama/aj	-aj
Inst.	-jof(v)/-of(v)	-ama	-ami

Declension patterns of feminine nouns ending in a (Standard Slovene)
Grammatical case\Number	Singular	Dual	Plural
Nom.	-∅	-i	-i
Gen.	-i	-i	-i
Dat.	-i	-ema	-em
Ac.	-∅	-i	-i
Loc.	-i	-eh/ih	-eh/ih
Inst.	-o	-ema	-mi

Declension of feminine adjectives.

Declension patterns of feminine adjectives (Prekmurje Slovene)
Grammatical case\Number	Singular	Dual	Plural
Nom.	-a	-ivi/evi	-e
Gen.	-e	-ivi(j)/evi(j)	-i(j)
Dat.	-oj	-ima	-in
Ac.	-o	-ivi/evi	-e
Loc.	-oj	-ima/ivaj/evaj	-i(j)
Inst.	-of(v)	-ima/ivima/evima	-imi

Declension patterns of feminine adjectives (Standard Slovene)
Grammatical case\Number	Singular	Dual	Plural
Nom.	-a	-i	-e
Gen.	-e	-ih	-ih
Dat.	-i	-ima	-im
Ac.	-o	-i	-e
Loc.	-i	-ih	-ih
Inst.	-o	-ima	-imi

=== Masculine ===
Masculine nouns ending in a consonant. The singular accusative of masculine nouns designating animate things is the same as their genitive. The singular accusative of nouns designating inanimate things is the same as their nominative.

Declension patterns of masculine nouns ending with a consonant (Prekmurje Slovene)
Grammatical case\Number	Singular	Dual	Plural
Nom.	-∅	-a	-i
Gen.	-a	-a/of(v)	-of(v)
Dat.	-i	-oma	-on
Ac.	-∅/a	-a	-e
Loc.	-i	-oma/aj	-aj/i
Inst.	-on	-oma	-ami

Declension patterns of masculine nouns ending with a consonant (Standard Slovene)
Grammatical case\Number	Singular	Dual	Plural
Nom.	-∅	-a	-i
Gen.	-∅/a	-ov	-ov
Dat.	-u	-oma	-om/-em
Ac.	-∅/a	-a	-e
Loc.	-u	-ih	-ih
Inst.	-om/-em	-oma	-i

Masculines nouns ending in a.

Declension patterns of feminine nouns ending in a (Prekmurje Slovene)
Grammatical case\Number	Singular	Dual	Plural
Nom.	-a	-a	-e/i
Gen.	-o/e	-of(v)/a	-∅/of(v)
Dat.	-i	-oma	-on
Ac.	-o	-a/i	-e
Loc.	-i	-oma/aj	-aj
Inst.	-of(v)	-oma	-ami/i

Declension patterns of feminine nouns ending in a (Standard Slovene)
Grammatical case\Number	Singular	Dual	Plural
Nom.	-a	-i	-e
Gen.	-e	-∅	-∅
Dat.	-i	-ama	-am
Ac.	-o	-i	-e
Loc.	-i	-ah	-ah
Inst.	-o	-ama	-ami

Declension of masculine adjective.

Declension patterns of masculine adjectives (Prekmurje Slovene)
Grammatical case\Number	Singular	Dual	Plural
Nom.	-i	-iva/eva	-i
Gen.	-oga	-iva/ivi(j)/eva/evi(j)	-i(j)
Dat.	-omi	-ima	-in
Ac.	-i/oga	-iva/eva	-e
Loc.	-on	-ima/ivaj/evaj/i(j)	-i(j)
Inst.	-in	-ima/ivima/evima	-imi

Declension patterns of masculine adjectives (Standard Slovene)
Grammatical case\Number	Singular	Dual	Plural
Nom.	-∅	-a	-i
Gen.	-∅/ega	-ih	-ih
Dat.	-emu	-ima	-im
Ac.	-∅/ega	-a	-e
Loc.	-em	-ih	-ih
Inst.	-im	-ima	-imi

=== Neuter ===
Neuter nouns ending in o and e.

Declension patterns of neuter nouns ending in o or e (Prekmurje Slovene)
Grammatical case\Number	Singular	Dual	Plural
Nom.	-o/e	-i	-a
Gen.	-a	-i/∅	-∅
Dat.	-i	-oma	-an
Ac.	-o/e	-i	-a
Loc.	-i	-oma/aj	-aj/ami/i
Inst.	-on	-oma	-ami/i

In declension, nouns such as tejlo (body, Standard Slovene: telo) or drejvo (three, Standard Slovene: drevo) do not lengthen as in the Standard Slovene with the syllable –es (Prekmurje Slovene: nominative tejlo, drejvo, genitive tejla, drejva; Standard Slovene: nominative telo, drevo, genitive telesa, drevesa).

Declension patterns of masculine nouns ending in e (Standard Slovene)
Grammatical case\Number	Singular	Dual	Plural
Nom.	-e	-i	-a
Gen.	-a	-∅	-∅
Dat.	-u	-ema	-em
Ac.	-e	-i	-a
Loc.	-u	-ih	-ih
Inst.	-em	-ima	-i

Declension patterns of masculine nouns ending in o (Standard Slovene)
Grammatical case\Number	Singular	Dual	Plural
Nom.	-o	-i	-a
Gen.	-a	-∅	-∅
Dat.	-u	-oma	-om
Ac.	-o	-i	-a
Loc.	-u	-ih	-ih
Inst.	-om	-oma	-i

Declension of neuter adjective.

Declension patterns of masculine adjectives (Prekmurje Slovene)
Grammatical case\Number	Singular	Dual	Plural
Nom.	-o	-ivi/evi	-a
Gen.	-oga	-ivi(j)/evi(j)/i(j)	-i(j)
Dat.	-omi	-ima/ivima/evima	-in
Ac.	-o	-ivi/evi	-a
Loc.	-on	-ima/ivima/evima/i(j)	-i(j)
Inst.	-in	-ima/ivima/evima	-imi

Declension patterns of neuter adjectives (Standard Slovene)
Grammatical case\Number	Singular	Dual	Plural
Nom.	-o/e	-i	-a
Gen.	-ega	-ih	-ih
Dat.	-emu	-ima	-im
Ac.	-o/e	-i	-a
Loc.	-em	-ih	-ih
Inst.	-im	-ima	-imi

=== Personal pronouns ===
==== Singular ====
Singular (Prekmurje Slovene)
Nom.	ges/jes (Masc.Fem.)	ti(j) (Masc.Fem.)	un (Masc.)	una (Fem.)
Gen.	mene(j) me	tebe(j) te	njega ga	nje je
Dat.	meni mi	tebi ti	njemi	njej/njoj ji
Ac.	mene(j) me	tebe(j) te	njega ga	njou jo
Loc.	meni	tebi	njen	njej/njoj
Inst	menof(v)/meuf	tebof(v)/teuf	njin	njouf(v)

Singular (Standard Slovene)
Nom.	jaz (Masc.Fem.Neut.)	ti (Masc.Fem.Neut)	on (Masc.)	ona (Fem.)	ono (Neut.)
Gen.	mene me	tebe te	njega ga	nje je	njega ga
Dat.	meni mi	tebi ti	njemu mu	njej/nji ji	njemu mu
Ac.	mene me -me	tebe te -te	njega ga -(e)nj	njo jo -njo	njega/ono ga -(e)nj
Loc.	pri meni	pri tebi	pri njem	pri njej/nji	pri njem
Inst.	z mano/menoj	s tabo/teboj	z njim	z njo	z njim

==== Dual ====
Dual (Prekmurje Slovene)
Nom.	müva (Masc.), müve (Fem.)	vüva (Masc.), vüve (Fem.)	njüva/njiva/oneva (Masc), njüve/njive (Fem.)
Gen.	naj(a)	vaj(a)	njiva(Masc), njivi (Fem.)
Dat.	nama	vama	njima
Ac.	naj(a)	vaj(a)	njiva(Masc), njivi (Fem.)
Loc.	nama	vama	njima
Inst.	nama	vama	njima

Dual (Standard Slovene)
Nom.	midva (Masc.), medve (Fem.Neut.)	vidva (Masc.), vedve (Fem.Neut.)	onadva (Masc.), onidve (Fem.Neut.)
Gen.	naju	vaju	njiju
Dat.	nama	vama	njima jima
Ac.	naju	vaju	njiju ju -nju
Loc.	naju	vaju	njiju
Inst.	nama	vama	njima

==== Plural ====
Plural (Prekmurje Slovene)
Nom.	mi (Masc. fem.)	vi (Masc. fem.)	uni (Masc.), une (Fem.)
Gen.	nas	vas	njih/nji jih/je
Dat.	nan	van	njin jin
Ac.	nas	vas	njih/nje jih je
Loc.	nas/nan	vas/van	njij
Inst.	nami	vami	njimi

Plural (Standard Slovene)
Nom.	mi (Masc.), me (Fem. neut.)	vi (Masc.), ve (Fem. neut.)	oni (Masc.), one (Fem.), ona (Neut.)
Gen.	nas	vas	njih jih
Dat.	nam	vam	njim jim
Ac.	nas	vas	njih/nje jih -nje
Loc.	nas	vas	njih
Inst.	nami	vami	njimi

==== Reflexive pronoun ====
Prekmurje Slovene
Nom.	—
Gen.	sebe(j) se
Dat.	sebi si
Ac.	sebe(j) se
Loc.	sebi/sebej
Inst.	sebof(v)/seuf

Standard Slovene
Nom.	—
Gen.	sebe se
Dat.	sebi si
Ac.	sebe se -se
Loc.	sebi
Inst.	sabo/seboj

==== Numerals ====
The names for numerals in Prekmurje Slovene follow a similar way to that found in Standard Slovene or other Slavic languages. Then again, the archaic way of forming two-digit numbers has been preserved. The ten comes first, followed by the singular digit number. A conjunction is not needed. In Standard Slovene, the numerals from 21 to 99 are formed by placing the singular in front of the ten ("four-and-twenty"), like in German language.

Numerals
Prekmurje Slovene	Standard Slovene	Number
štirideset eden	enainštirideset	41
štirideset dva	dvainštirideset	42
štirideset tri(j)	triinštirideset	43
štirideset štiri	štiriinštirideset	44

=== Verb ===
The verb ending in Prekmurje Slovene is most frequently üvati or avati, more rarely ovati (the ending ovati is the most frequent in Standard Slovene). In conjugation, the endings are also dissimilar in Prekmurje Slovene and standard Slovene. Example: Prekmurje Slovene: nategüvati, obrezavati, conj. nategüvlen/nategüjen, obrezavlen, Standard Slovene: nategovati, obrezovati, conj. nategujem, obrezujem.

In the Goričko dialect and some western subdialects of Ravensko, the infinitive ending is -niti (zdigniti), as it is in Standard Slovene (dvigniti), or rarely -nouti (Prekmurje Slovene obrnouti, Standard Slovene obrniti). In the Dolinsko dialect and other Ravensko subdialects, the infinitive ending is -noti (zdignoti), as it is in Croatian (and Kajkavian).

==== Present tense ====
Prekmurje Slovene
Singular	lübin	lübiš	lübi
Dual	lübiva	lübita	lübita
Plural	lübimo	lübite	lübijo

Standard Slovene
Singular	ljubim	ljubiš	ljubi
Dual	ljubiva	ljubita	ljubita
Plural	ljubimo	ljubite	ljubijo

==== Past tense ====
Prekmurje Slovene
Singular	san/sen lübo(Masc.) lübila(Fem.)	si lübo(Masc.) lübila(Fem.)	je lübo(Masc.) lübila(Fem.)
Dual	sva lübila(Masc.) lübili(Fem.)	sta lübila(Masc.) lübili(Fem.)	sta lübila(Masc.) lübili(Fem.)
Plural	smo lübili(Masc.) lübile(Fem.)	ste lübili(Masc.) lübile(Fem.)	so lübili(Masc.) lübile(Fem.)

Standard Slovene
Singular	sem ljubil(Masc.) ljubila(Fem.)	si ljubil(Masc.) ljubila(Fem.)	je ljubil(Masc.) ljubila(Fem.)
Dual	sva ljubila(Masc.) ljubili(Fem.)	sta ljubila(Masc.) ljubili(Fem.)	sta ljubila(Masc.) ljubili(Fem.)
Plural	smo ljubili(Masc.) ljubile(Fem.)	ste ljubili(Masc.) ljubile(Fem.)	so ljubili(Masc.) ljubile(Fem.)

==== Future tense ====
Prekmurje Slovene
Singular	mo lübo(Masc.) lübila(Fem.)	boš lübo(Masc.) lübila(Fem.)	de lübo(Masc.) lübila(Fem.)
Dual	va lübila(Masc.) lübili(Fem.)	ta lübila(Masc.) lübili(Fem.)	ta lübila(Masc.) lübili(Fem.)
Plural	mo lübili(Masc.) lübile(Fem.)	te lübili(Masc.) lübile(Fem.)	do lübili(Masc.) lübile(Fem.)

Standard Slovene
Singular	bom ljubil(Masc.) ljubila(Fem.)	boš ljubil(Masc.) ljubila(Fem.)	bo ljubil(Masc.) ljubila(Fem.)
Dual	bova ljubila(Masc.) ljubili(Fem.)	bosta ljubila(Masc.) ljubili(Fem.)	bosta ljubila(Masc.) ljubili(Fem.)
Plural	bomo ljubili(Masc.) ljubile(Fem.)	boste ljubili(Masc.) ljubile(Fem.)	bodo ljubili(Masc.) ljubile(Fem.)

==== Present conditional ====
Prekmurje Slovene
Singular	bi lübo(Masc.) lübila(Fem.)	bi lübo(Masc.) lübila(Fem.)	bi lübo(Masc.) lübila(Fem.)
Dual	bi lübila(Masc.) lübili(Fem.)	bi lübila(Masc.) lübili(Fem.)	bi lübila(Masc.) lübili(Fem.)
Plural	bi lübili(Masc.) lübile(Fem.)	bi lübili(Masc.) lübile(Fem.)	bi lübili(Masc.) lübile(Fem.)

Standard Slovene
Singular	bi ljubil(Masc.) ljubila(Fem.)	bi ljubil(Masc.) ljubila(Fem.)	bi ljubil(Masc.) ljubila(Fem.)
Dual	bi ljubila(Masc.) ljubili(Fem.)	bi ljubila(Masc.) ljubili(Fem.)	bi ljubila(Masc.) ljubili(Fem.)
Plural	bi ljubili(Masc.) ljubile(Fem.)	bi ljubili(Masc.) ljubile(Fem.)	bi ljubili(Masc.) ljubile(Fem.)

== Vocabulary ==
The Prekmurje Slovene vocabulary is very rich and differs significantly from the Standard Slovene vocabulary. The dialect includes many archaic words that have disappeared from modern Slovene. Along with the three dialects spoken in Venetian Slovenia and the Slovene dialects of eastern Carinthia, Prekmurje Slovene is considered the most conservative of all Slovene dialects in regard to the vocabulary.

The Prekmurje Slovene has expanded its vocabulary to a large degree with words from other Slavic languages (mainly from Kajkavian Croatian, Standard Slovene, Styrian Slovene, Serbo-Croatian, partly from the Czech and Slovak) and non-Slavic languages (mainly from Hungarian and German, partly from Latin and Italian). More recent and less assimilated words are typically from English.

=== Comparison ===
Prekmurje Slovene	Standard Slovene	Kajkavian Croatian	Serbo-Croatian	English
bajžlek	bazilika	bajžulek, bažuljek	bosiljak	basil
bejžati	hiteti, teči	bežati	trčati	run
betvo	betev	betvo	stabljika	stem
blejdi	bled	bledi	blijed	white-faced
bliskanca	bliskavica	bliskavica, blesikavec	blistanje	flashing
bougati	ubogati	poslušati	pokoravati se, slušati	submit
brač	trgač	brač	berač	vintager
brbrati, brbravi	klepetati, klepetav	brbotati, brblivi, brbotlivi	brbljati, brbljavi	chatter, chatterbox
comprnjak	čarovnik, čarodej	coprnik carovnik	čarobnjak	wizard
cükati	lulati	cukati	piškiti	urinate
čarni, črni	črn	črni	crn	black
česnek	česen	česen, češnjak	češnjak	garlic
činiti	delati, opravljati	činiti	činiti	make
čun	čoln	čun	čamac	boat
čüti	slišati	čuti	čuti	hear
den	dan	den	dan	day
dečko	fant, deček	dečko	dečak	boy
deklina, dekla	deklica	dekle	devojka	girl
delati	delati	delati	raditi	work
dokeč	dokler	doklam, dok	dok	until
dveri	vrata	vrata	vrata	door
fala	hvala	fala/hvala	hvala	thanks, gratitude
fčela	čebela	čmela	pčela	bee
fčera/včera	včeraj	čera	jučer	yesterday
geniti	ganiti	genuti	ganuti	move
ge	kje, kjer	de, gde	gdje	where
gorice	vinograd	trsje	vinograd	vineyard
grbanj	jurček	vrganj	vrganj	penny bun
gnes, gnjes	danes	denes	danas	today
gnüs	gnus	gnus, gnjus	gnus	disgust
gostüvanje	ženitovanje	goščenje	svadba	wedding
goušča	gozd	šuma	šuma	forest
gučati	govoriti	govoriti	govoriti	speak, talk
grüška	hruška	hruška	kruška	pear
inda	nekoč	negda	nekada	once
istina	resnica	istina	istina	truth
iža	hiša	hiža	kuća	house
Jezuš Kristuš	Jezus Kristus	Jezuš Kristuš	Isus Krst	Jesus Christ
ka	kaj	kaj	što	what
ka	da	da	da	that
ka	ker	arold jernew	jer	as
kakši	kakšen	kakvi	kakov	what
kama	kam, kamor	kam	kamo	to where
kapla	kaplja	kaplja, kapla	kapljica	drop
keden, tjeden	teden	tjeden	tjedan	week
kelko	koliko	kulko, kuliko	koliko	how much
kisili	kisel	kisel	kiseo	sour
kitina	kutina	kutina	dunja	quince
klejt	klet, shramba	sramba	podrum	cellar
klün	kljun	klun	kljun	beak
kmica	tema	tmica, kmica	tama, tmina	darkness
koupanca	kopalnica	kopel	kupatilo	bathroom
kopün	kopun	kopon, kopun	kopun	capon
koula	voz	kola, vozica	kola	cart
krapanca	krastača	krastača	krastača	toad
krpliva	kopriva	kopriva	kopriva	nettle
krpüšnica	robidnica, robida	kupina	kupina	blackberry
krumpiš, krumpič, krumše	krompir	krumpir	krumpir	potato
krüj	kruh	kruh	hlijeb, kruh	bread
krv	kri	krv	krv	blood
kukorca	koruza	kuruza	kuruza	corn
küščar	kuščar	kuščer	gušter	lizard
lapec	hlapec	hlapec	sluga	servant
ledičen	samski	ledičen	samac	bachelor
lejko	lahko	lehko	lako	possible
len	lan	len	lan	flax
lice	obličje	lice	lice	face
liki	toda, ampak	nego	međutim, ali	but
loški	divji	divji	divlji	wild (plant)
lübezen	ljubezen	ljubav, lubav	ljubav	love
mejšati	mešati	mešati	miješati	mix
meša	maša	meša	misa	mass
metül	metulj	metul, metulj	leptir	butterfly
mouč	moč	jakost	jakost	power
modroust	modrost	mudrost	mudrost	wisdom
Möra, Müra	Mura	Mura	Mura	Mura (river)
mrejti	umreti	hmreti, vumreti	umreti	die
mrlina	mrhovina, crkovina	mrcina	lešina	corpse
miditi	muditi	muditi	kasniti	be late
müja	muha	muha	muha	fly
nači(k)	drugače	inače	inače	other
natelebati	natepsti	nabobotati, namlatiti	istuči	beat
nedela	nedelja	nedela	nedjelja	Sunday
nigdar	nikoli	nigdar	nikada	never
nigi	nikjer	nigde, nigdi	nigdje	nowhere
nikak	nikakor	nikak	nikako	no way
nojet	noht	nohet	nokat	nail
norija	norost, neumnost	norost, norija	glupost	foolishness
obed, obid, oböd	kosilo	obed	ručak	lunch
oditi	hoditi	hoditi	hoditi	move
odzaja	odzadaj, zadaj	odzaj	odostraga	from behind
ograd	vrt	vrt	vrt	garden
ovak	drugače	inače	inače	other
öček	sekirica	sekirica	sjekira	ax
pajžli	parkelj	parkel	kopita	hoof
paroven	pohlepen, požrešen	paraven	proždrljiv	gluttonous
paska	pazljivost	paska	skrbljenje	prudence
pejati	bosti	pehati	ubosti	prod
pejsek	pesek	pesek	pijesak	sand
pesen	pesem	pesem	pjesma	song
pondejlek	ponedeljek	pondelek	ponedjeljak	Monday
pitati, pitanje	vprašati, vprašanje	pitati, pitanje	pitati, pitanje	ask, question
plantavi	šepav	šantavi, plantavi	šepav, šantav	lame
plastič	kopica, kopa	stok	plast sena	haycock
plüča	pljuča	pluča	pluća	lung
plüskati	klofutati	pluskati	ošamariti	slap
poboukšati	poboljšati	pobolšati	poboljšati	improve
pogača	potica	pogača	pogača	scone
pojeb, pojbič	fant, fantič	dečec	dečak	boy
pokapanje	pokop	pokapanje	pogreb	burial
pozoj	zmaj	pozoj	zmaj	dragon
pükša	puška	puška, pušak	puška	riffle
praviti	reči	reči	reći	say
püščava	puščava	pustina	pustinja	desert
radost	veselje	radost	radost	joy
ranč tak, gli tak	prav tako	ravno tak	isto tako	alike
rasoje, rašoške	vile, vilice	rasohe	vile, viljuška	pitchfork, fork
rejč	beseda	reč	riječ	word
sklejca	skleda, krožnik	zdela	zdjela	dish
sledi, sledkar	kasneje	stopram	kasnije	later
slejpi	slep	slepi	slijep	blind
smej	smeh	smeh	smijeh	laugh
spitavati	izpraševati, spraševati	spitavati	ispitavati	interrogate
sprejvod	pogreb	sprevod, pogreb	pogreb	funeral
spuniti	izpolniti	spuniti	ispuniti	fulfil
stüdenec	vodnjak	zdenec	bunar	well
sunce	sonce	sunce	sunce	sun
svaja	prepir	svaja	svađa	conflict
ščava	kislica	ščava	štavelj	sorrels
šinjek	vrat, tilnik	šinjak	vrat	neck
šoula, škola	šola	škola	škola	school
školnik	učitelj	školnik	učitelj	teacher
škrampeu	krempelj	krampel	pandža	claw
taca	šapa	taca	šapa	paw
telko	toliko	tulko, tuliko	toliko	that much
tejlo	telo	telo	tijelo	body
tenja	senca	senca	zasenak	shadow
tou	to	to, ovo	to, ovo	this
trplenje	tprljenje	muka	muka	pain
trüd	trud	trud	napor	effort
türen, tören	stolp	turem	toranj	tower
ugorka	kumara	vugorek	krastavac	cucumber
vaga	tehtnica	vaga	vaga	scales
veleti	ukazati	veleti	naređivati	instruct
vejnec	venec	venec	vjenac	wreath
vonjati	smrdeti	smrdeti	smrdeti	smell
vonjüga	smrad	smrad	smrad	stench
vüpati, vüpanje	upati, upanje	vufati, vufanje	ufati, ufanje	hope, trust
vživati	uživati	vživati	uživati	enjoy
zajtra	zjutraj	vjutro	ujutro	morning
zoubar	zobozdravnik	zobar	zubar	dentist
zveličanje	zveličanje	zveličenje	spasenje	redemption
žalec	želo	žalec	žaoka	sting
žmeten	težek	teški	teški	heavy
žnjec	žanjec	žnjač	žetelac	harvester
žuč	žolč	žuč	žuč	bile
žuna	žolna	žuna	detlić	woodpecker
župa	juha	juha	supa	soup

=== Loanwords ===
Prekmurje Slovene also contains many words of mostly German and Hungarian origin. The German loanwords mostly originate from the Austro-Bavarian dialect. There is still a strong German influence in the Goričko dialect.

Prekmurje Slovene	Hungarian	Standard Slovene	English
beteg, betežen	betegség, beteg	bolezen, bolan	illness, ill
čonta, čunta	csont	kost	bone
engriš	egres	kosmulja	gooseberry
gezero, jezero	ezer	tisoč	thousand
pajdaš	pajtás	kamerad	buddy
laboška	lábas, lábos	kozica	pot
ugorka	uborka	kumara	cucumber
koudiš	koldus	berač	beggar
valon	való	veljaven	suitable
varaš	város	mesto	city, town

Prekmurje Slovene	German	Standard Slovene	English
brütif, brütof	Friedhof	pokopališče	cemetery
cajgar	Zeiger	kazalec	hand of watch
cigeu	Ziegel	opeka	brick
cimprati	zimmparon(Bav.)	graditi	build (with wood)
cug	Zug	vlak	train
cvek	zwëc(Middle High German)	žebelj	spike
dönok, denok	dennoch(Middle High German)	vendar	however
fabrika	Fabrik	tovarna	factory
fašenek	Fasching	pust	carnival
farba	Farbe	barva	color
farar	Pfarrer	duhovnik	Protestant pastor
fejronga	Vorhang	zavesa	curtain
förtoj	Fürtuch(Bavarian)	predpasnik	woman apron
glaž	Glas	steklo	glass
gratati	geraten	postati, nastati	to arise
gvant	Gewand	obleka	clothes
lampe	Lippen	usta	mouth
pejgla	Bügeleisen	likalnik	clothes iron
plac	Plaz	trg	square
rafankeraš, rafankerar	Rauchfangkehrer	dimnikar	chimney-sweep
šalica	Schale(Bavarian)	skodelica	cup
šker	geschirre(Middle High German)	orodje	tool
špilati	spielen	igrati	play
šrajf	Schrafe(Bavarian)	vijak	screw
šraklin	Schürhakel	žarač, grebača	fire rake
žajfa	Seife	milo	soap

We also find Latin loanwords: bauta, bunta (storage, Latin voluta, Standard Slovene trgovina), cintor (cemetery, Latin coementerium, Standard Slovene pokopališče), kanta (can, Latin canna, Standard Slovene ročka), oštarija (inn, Italian osteria, Standard Slovene gostilna), upkaš (hoopoe, Latin upupa, Standard Slovene smrdokavra) etc.

Loanwords adopted from Serbo-Croatian in the period of Yugoslavia: dosaden (tedious, Serbo-Croatian dosadan, Standard Slovene dolgočasen), novine (newspaper, Serbo-Croatian novine, Standard Slovene časopis), život (live, Serbo-Croatian život, Standard Slovene življenje).

== Wendish question ==
There are many theories on how Prekmurje Slovene emerged as a language. The oldest theory from the 16th century argued that the Slovenes east of the Mura were descendants of the Vandals.

In 1627, a notable event was the Protestant visitation in the Tótság or Slovene District (this is the historical name of the Prekmurje and Raba March, Prekmurje Slovene: Slovenska okroglina).

According to Hungarian dissenters, the Wendish (Prekmurje Slovene) language was of Danish, Sorbian, Germanic, Celtic, Eastern Romance or West Slavic extraction. These were false political or exaggerated claims.

According to Hungarian nationalist groups, the Wends were captured by Turkish and Croatian troops who later became part of the Hungarian society. Another popular theory created by some Hungarian nationalists was that the speakers of the Wendish language were actually Magyar peoples and that some had merged into the Slavic population of Slovenia over the last 800 years.

In 1920, Hungarian physicist Sándor Mikola wrote a number of books about Slovene inhabitants of Hungary and the Wendish language: the Wendish-Celtic theory. Accordingly, the Wends (Slovenens in Hungary) were of Celtic descent, not Slavic. Mikola later also adopted the belief that the Wends were actually Slavic-speaking Hungarians. This theories were supported by the Hungarian ethnonationalistic state programme. Mikola also thought the Wends, Slovenes and Croatians, were all descendants of the Pannonian Romans, therefore they have their Latin blood and culture.

During the Hungarian revolution when Hungarians rebelled against Habsburg rule, the Catholic Slovenes sided with the Catholic Habsburgs. The Lutheran Slovenes, however, supported the rebel Lajos Kossuth siding with Hungary and they pleaded for the separation of Hungary from Habsburg Austria which had its anti-Protestant policy. At that time, the reasoning that the inhabitants of the Rába Region were not Slovenes but Wends and "Wendish-Slovenes" respectively and that, as a consequence, their ancestral Slavic-Wendish language was not to be equated with the other Slovenes living in the Austro-Hungarian Empire was established. In the opinion of the Lutheran-Slovene priest of Hodoš, the only option for the Lutheran Slovenes emerging from the Catholic Slovenian population was to support Kossuth and his Hungarian culture. Thereafter, the Lutheran Slovenes used their language in churches and schools in the most traditional way in order to distinguish themselves from the Catholic Slovenes and the Slovene language (i.e., pro-Hungarian or pan-Slavic Slovene literature). Lutheran priests and believers remained convicted that they could only adhere to their Lutheran faith when following the wish of the Hungarians (or the Austrians) and considering themselves "Wendish Slovenes". If they did not conform to this, they would be in danger of being assimilated into Hungarian culture.

In the years preceding World War I, the Hungarian Slovenes were swept into the ideology of Panslavism, the national unity of all Slavic-speaking peoples of Eastern Europe. The issue was volatile in the fragmented Austro-Hungarian empire, which was defeated in the war. In the 1921 Treaty of Trianon, the southern half (not the whole) of the Prekmurje region was ceded to the Kingdom of Serbs, Croats and Slovenes.

After 1867, the Hungarian government in Budapest tried to assimilate the Prekmurje Slovenes. In the 19th century, there was still a ban on using Prekmurje Slovene In Somogy. József Borovnyák, Ferenc Ivanóczy, and other Slovene politicians and writers helped safeguard the Prekmurje Slovene and identity.

In the late 20th century and today, the new notion for Prekmurje Slovenes is to conceive Prekmurje Slovene as actually a Slovene language, but not dialect. The people of Prekmurje and other Slovenes have common national and ethnic identity but the people of Prekmurje have also their special separate language identity, literature, grammar and spelling. Literature in Prekmurje Slovene is linguistically clearly distinguished from the literature in standard Slovene or other Slovene dialectical traditions. Prekmurje literature is always variegated, multifarious and not only a repository of religious books, as Slovene linguistics and literary history once claimed.

In the Communist Yugoslavia, Prekmurje Slovene was looked down upon because numerous writers, such as József Klekl, were anti-communists.

== Examples ==
A comparison of the Lord's Prayer in Standard Slovene, Old Prekmurje Slovene, new Prekmurje Slovene, Kajkavian Croatian, and Standard Croatian. The Prekmurje Slovene versions is taken from a 1942 prayer book (Zálozso János Zvér, Molitvena Kniga, Odobrena od cérkvene oblászti, Murska Sobota, 1942, third edition) and from a 2022 prayer book Jezuš tovariš moj. For easier comparison, the original Hungarian alphabet has been transliterated into Gaj's Latin alphabet, as used in other versions.

Standard Slovene

Oče naš, ki si v nebesih,
posvečeno bodi tvoje ime,
pridi k nam tvoje kraljestvo,
zgodi se tvoja volja
kakor v nebesih tako na zemlji.
Daj nam danes naš vsakdanji kruh
in odpusti nam naše dolge,
kakor tudi mi odpuščamo svojim dolžnikom,
in ne vpelji nas v skušnjavo,
temveč reši nas hudega.
Amen.

Old Prekmurje Slovene

Oča naš, ki si vu nebésaj!
Svéti se Ime tvoje.
Pridi králestvo tvoje.
Bojdi vola tvoja,
kak na nébi, tak i na zemli.
Krüha našega vsakdanéšnjega daj nam
ga dnes.
I odpüsti nam duge naše,
kak i mi odpüščamo dužnikom našim.
I ne vpelaj nas vu sküšávanje.
Nego odslobodi nas od hüdoga.
Amen.

New Prekmurje Slovene

Oča naš, šteri si v nebesaj,
sveti se ime tvojo,
pridi k nan kralestvo tvojo,
bodi vola tvoja
kak na nebi tak na zemli.
Krüj naš sakdanešnji daj nan gnes,
odpüsti nan duge naše,
kak mi odpüščamo dužnikon našin.
Ne pelaj nas v sküšnjavo,
nego rejši nas hüdoga.
Amen.

Standard Kajkavian

Otec naš, koji jesi v nebesih,
sveti se ime tvoje,
dojdi kralevstvo tvoje,
budi volja tvoja,
kak na nebu tak i na zemli.
Kruh naš svakdašni daj
nam denes
i otpusti nam duge naše,
kak i mi otpuščamo dužnikom našim,
i ne uvedi nas v napast,
nek izbavi nas od zla.
Amen.

Standard Croatian

Oče naš, koji jesi na nebesima,
sveti se ime tvoje,
dođi kraljevstvo tvoje,
budi volja tvoja,
kako na nebu tako i na zemlji.
Kruh naš svagdanji daj
nam danas
i otpusti nam duge naše,
kako i mi otpuštamo dužnicima našim,
i ne uvedi nas u napast,
nego izbavi nas od zla.
Amen.

=== Examples from main Prekmurje Slovene dialects ===
Highland (Goričko) dialect (Selo, Moravske Toplice)

Mouž pa žena sta domou gnala kravo, štero sta na senji v Motvarjavcaj küjpila. Nouč je že bjla, nejbo je bilou puno zvejzd pa mejsec fejst svejto. Mouž je kravo vlejko za lanc, žena jo je pa odza gonila z boton.

Preci potij sta že opodila, kda sta pa bila blüjzi potoka, sta na nejbi pod seuf vídla glij takšiva dva, kak kravo ženejta. Kak da bi samiva sebe vidla v glendali! Samo ka njima je tista ženska majütala z rokouv, ka naj idete bole na pravo rokou. Tak sta tüdi šla, pa sta zabloudila mijmo mousta pa v potok spadnola s kravov vrejt. Šče sreča, ka je bilou malo vodej v njon, vači bi se vsi trgej zalejali v njon.

Kda so se vö rejšili z vodej, je tista prikazen z nejba minoula.

Standard Slovene

Mož in žena sta vodila kravo, kupljeno na senju v Motvarjevcih, proti domu. Bila je že noč, nebo je bilo posejano z zvezdami in mesec je sijal. Mož je vlekel kravo za verigo, žena pa jo je od zadaj priganjala s palico.

Dobršen kos poti sta že prehodila, ko pa sta se približala potoku, sta na nebu nad sabo zagledala prav taka, kot onadva, ki sta ravno tako gnala kravo. Kot da bi videla sama sebe v ogledalu! Vendar pa jima je tista ženska na nebu mahala z roko, naj gresta bolj na desno. Tako sta tudi ravnala, vendar pa sta zgrešila most in s kravo vred padla v potok Še sreča, da je bilo le malo vode v njem, sicer bi se vsi trije utopili.

Ko pa so rešili iz vode, je nebesna prikazen izginila.

Lowland (Ravensko) dialect (Murski Črnci)

Eden moški je kesno vnoči s konjami vlejko pune mele z mlina domou.

Kda je pelo prejk potoka Mokoša, je vido gouske, štere so se koupale notri. Zeu je bič pa z norije začno mlatiti po nji. Pa so priletele do kola, prijale potače, pa so ga nej püstile naprej. Tisti moment so se spremejnile v čarno oblečene ženske, štere so bile doma ž njegove pa s sousidni vesnic. Zgrabile so ga pa začnole gvant ž njega trgati, zraven pa so njemi zagrouzile, ka njemi gezik vö potegnejo, če je vö ovadi komi.

Standard Slovene

Nek možakar je pozno ponoči s konjsko vprego vlekel poln voz moke iz mlina domov.

Ko je prečkal Mokoš, je videl goske, ki so se kopale v njem. Vzel je bič in iz objestnosti švrkal po njih, pa so priletele do voza, prijele za kolesa in ga niso pustile naprej. V tem so se že spremenile v črno oblečene ženske, domačinke iz njegove in sosednje vasi. Ujele so ga in pričele trgati obleki iz njega, grozeč mu, da mu iztrgajo jezik, če jih komu izda.

Lower Lowland (Dolinsko) dialect (Bratonci)

Zidari so pri ednoj iži zidali nouvo ižo. Vertinja njin je dobro dvorila. Pouleg župe pa mesa so meli sakši den na stouli šče dobre retaše pa krapce. Piti so si pa točili po vouli.

Krav pa pri iži nej bilou, ka bi je dojijli, moški so pa tüdi nigdar nej vidli, ka bi kakša sousida prinesla k iži mlejko eli kislikaj, kak je v Prekmörji pač bijla stara navada. Če so ge zidali, so sousidje pa rodbina pomagali z delon pa jestijon.

Gda so zidari tak že več dnij dobro jeli, je eden od njij, šteromi je bilou sümlivo, stoupo pred obedon v küjnjo gledat, kak vertinja küja.

Ravno te je zela krapce s peči, te je pa v rokaj stiskavala krotajco, šteroj je z gobca prikaplalo vrnje, z njin je pa namazala krapce.

Tak so zidari gor prišli, ka je vertinja cumprnica, pa v pamet zeli, otket njoj telko kisilaka pa vrnja.

Standard Slovene

Zidarji so pri neki hiši zidali novo zgradbo. Gospodinja jim je dobro stregla. Ob juhi in mesu so imeli vsak dan na mizi tudi zavitke in pogače. Tudi pijačo so si točili po volji.

Krave pa pri hiši ni bilo, da bi jo dojili in možje nikoli niso videli, da bi katera izmed sosed prinesla k hiši mleko ali skuto, kakor je bila v Prekmurju navada. Če so namreč kje zidali, so sosedje in sorodniki pomagali z delom in hrano.

Ko so zidarji tako že nekaj dni dobro jedli, je eden izmed njih, ki mu je bilo vse skupaj sumljivo, stopil pred kosilom v kuhinjo, da bi videl, kako gospodinja kuha.

Ravnokar je vzela pogače iz peči. Nato je v rokah stiskala krastačo, ki ji je prikapljalo iz gobca smetano, s katerim je namazala pogače.

Tako so zidarji spoznali, da je gospodinja čarovnica, in ugotovili, odkod ji toliko smetane in skute.

=== Slovene national anthem in Prekmurje Slovene ===
Original version (by France Prešeren)

Spet trte so rodile
prijatli, vince nam sladkó,
ki nam oživlja žile,
srcé razjásni in oko,
ki utopi
vse skrbi,
v potrtih prsih up budi!

Komú najpred veselo
zdravljico, bratje! čmò zapét'!
Bog našo nam deželo,
Bog živi ves slovenski svet,
brate vse,
kar nas je
sinóv sloveče matere!

V sovražnike 'z oblakov
rodú naj naš'ga treši gróm;
prost, ko je bil očakov,
naprej naj bo Slovencov dom;
naj zdrobé
njih roké
si spone, ki jih še težé!

Edinost, sreča, sprava
k nam naj nazaj se vrnejo;
otrók, kar ima Slava,
vsi naj si v róke sežejo,
de oblast
in z njo čast,
ko préd, spet naša boste last!

Bog žívi vas Slovenke,
prelepe, žlahtne rožice;
ni take je mladenke,
ko naše je krvi dekle;
naj sinóv
zarod nov
iz vas bo strah sovražnikov!

Mladenči, zdaj se pije
zdravljica vaša, vi naš up;
ljubezni domačije
noben naj vam ne usmŕti strup;
ker zdaj vàs
kakor nàs,
jo sŕčno bránit' kliče čas!

Živé naj vsi naródi,
ki hrepené dočakat' dan,
da koder sonce hodi,
prepir iz svéta bo pregnan,
da rojak
prost bo vsak,
ne vrag, le sosed bo mejak!

Nazadnje še, prijatlji,
kozarce zase vzdignimo,
ki smo zato se zbrat'li,
ker dobro v srcu mislimo;
dókaj dni
naj živí
vsak, kar nas dobrih je ljudi!

Prekmurje Slovene version (translated Peter Brenčič, 2018)

Pajdaši! poroudilo,
je tršče víjno nan sladko,
štero nam žilé poživê,
srcê bistrî pa okô,
štero doj vtopî,
sakše skrbi,
v potrtij prsaj vüpanje bidî !

Komi naj najprlê vesêjlo
zdravico, bratja !mo spopêvali !
Boug našo nam krajino,
Boug živi Slovenski cêjli svejt,
brate vse,
ka nas je,
sinov sloveče matere!

F te štêri nas mrzê, doj z oblakov
roda naj našoga' ga vdari gron;
prost, tak kak je biu že očákov
dale naj bo Slovencov doum;
naj spotêrejo
njüve roke
si lance štêri jih drž ê!

Fküp držanje, sreča, spravlênje
k nan naj nazaj pridejo;
dicê, kelko jih ma Slava,
vsi si naj v roke sêgnejo,
te de vlast
vkup z njo pa čast,
kak prle, boujo naša last!

Boug živi vas Slovenke,
lepe, érašne roužice;
nega takših mladih diklin,
kak naša je krf dekel
naj sinov
zarod nouv
od vas de straj neprijatelof.

Pojge, zdaj se pige
zdravica vaša, vi naš vüp;
lübezen domačije
ni eden naj vas ne buje strup;
kak zdaj vas,
tak kak nas,
jo srčno branoti zove čas !

Živêjo naj vsi narodi,
štêri trdno ščêjo dočakat dên,
da tan gê sunce odi
svaja iz svejta de stirana,
gda rojak
sloboden bou fsak,
nej vrag, liki sousid bou mejak!

Na kunci pa še, pajdaši,
küpice za sebe zdignimo,
šteri smo se zato pobratili,
ka dobro v srci mislimo;
püno dni
naj živi
saki, pa vsi ka nas je dobrij lidi!

== Gallery ==
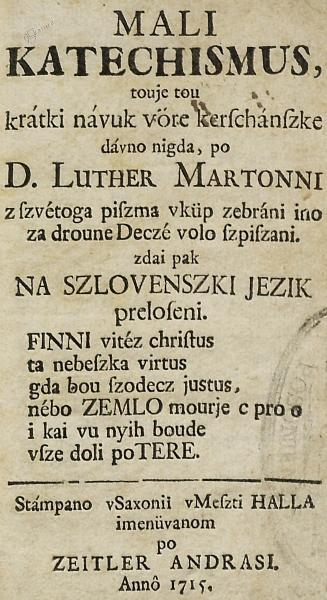
The first printed book in Prekmurje Slovene: Mali cathecismus (Small Catechism), by Ferenc Temlin.

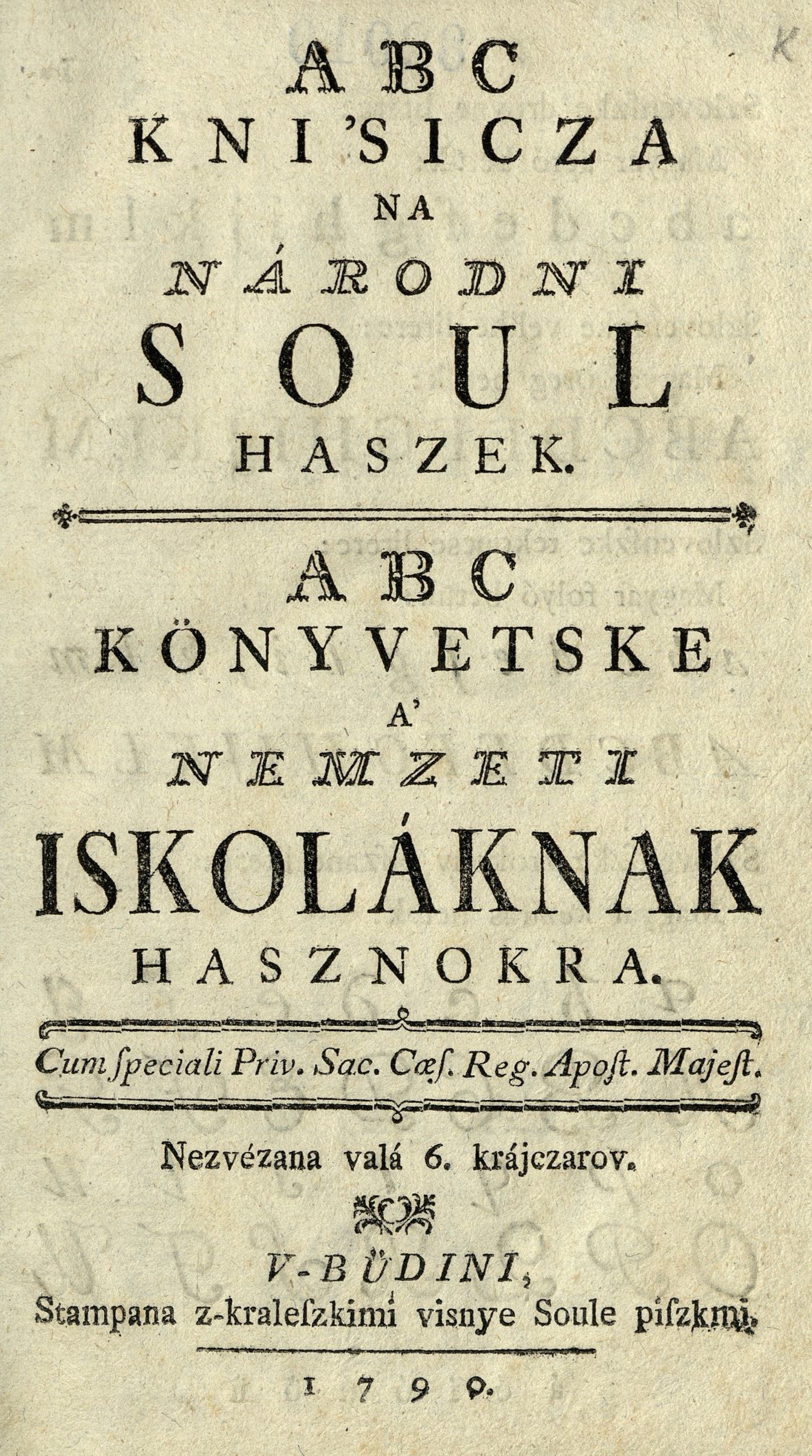
The ABC-book of Miklós Küzmics. This is also the first Hungarian-Slovenian Dictionary.

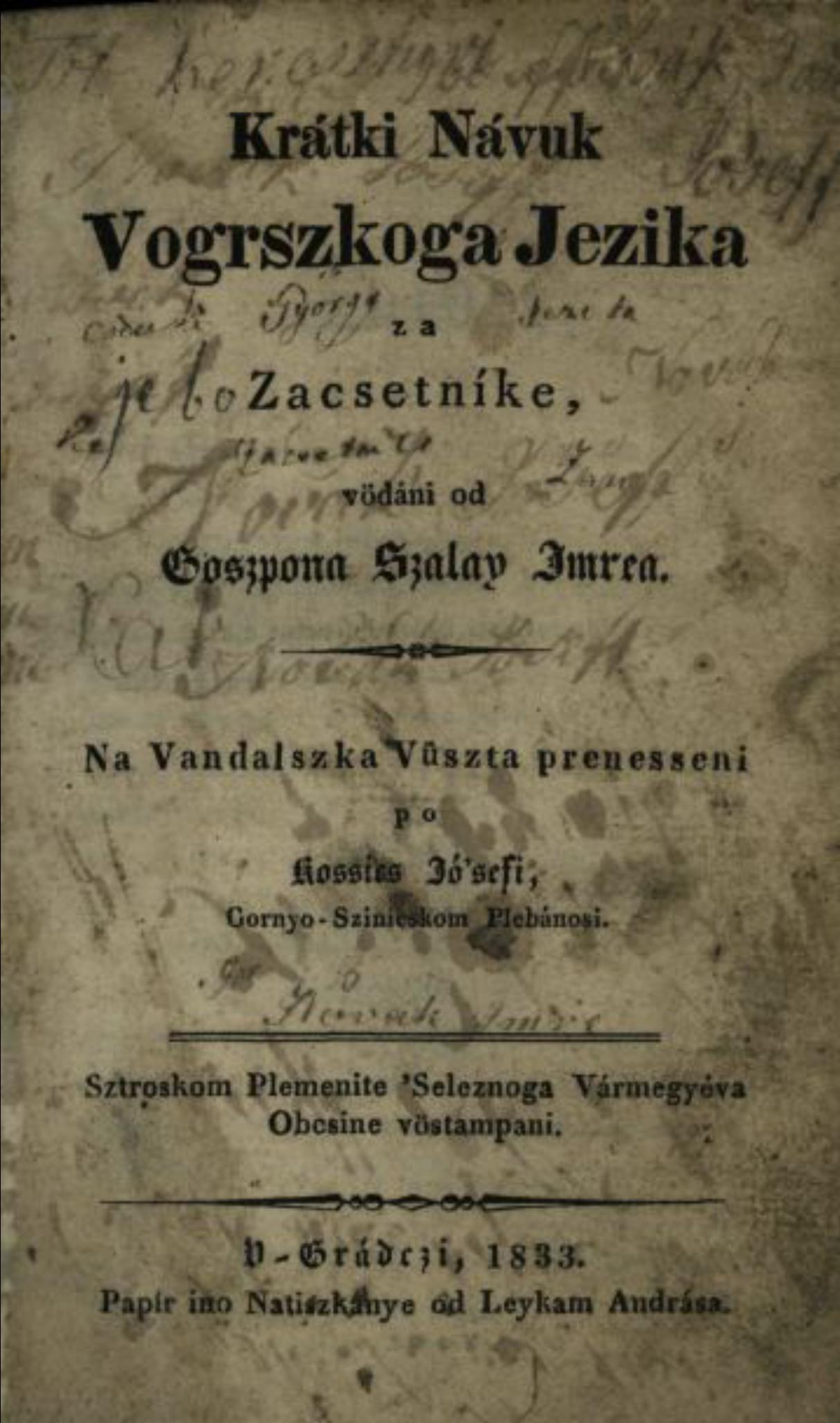
József Kossics: Small Grammar of the Hungarian language and Vandalic language

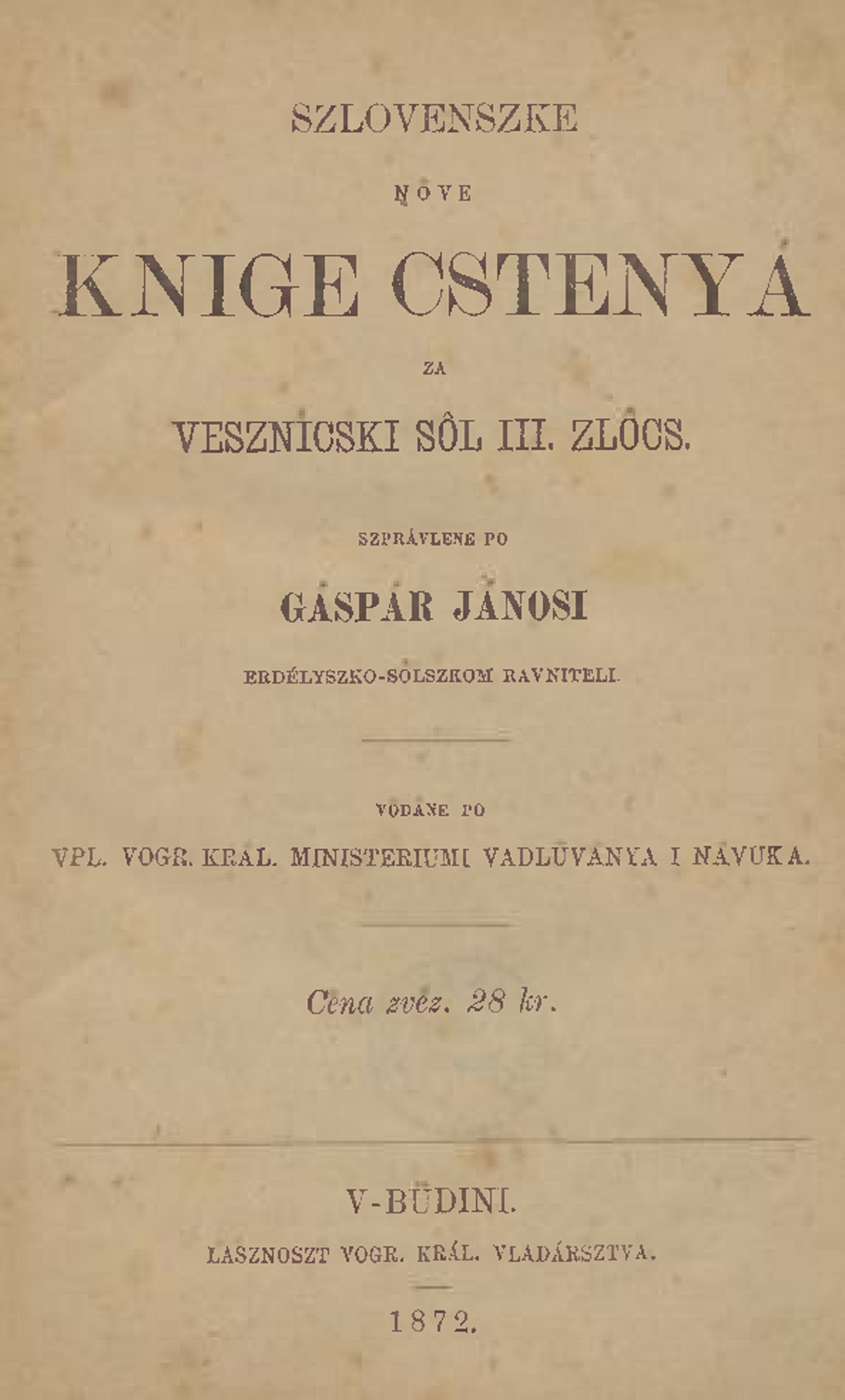
János Kardos's school book from 1872

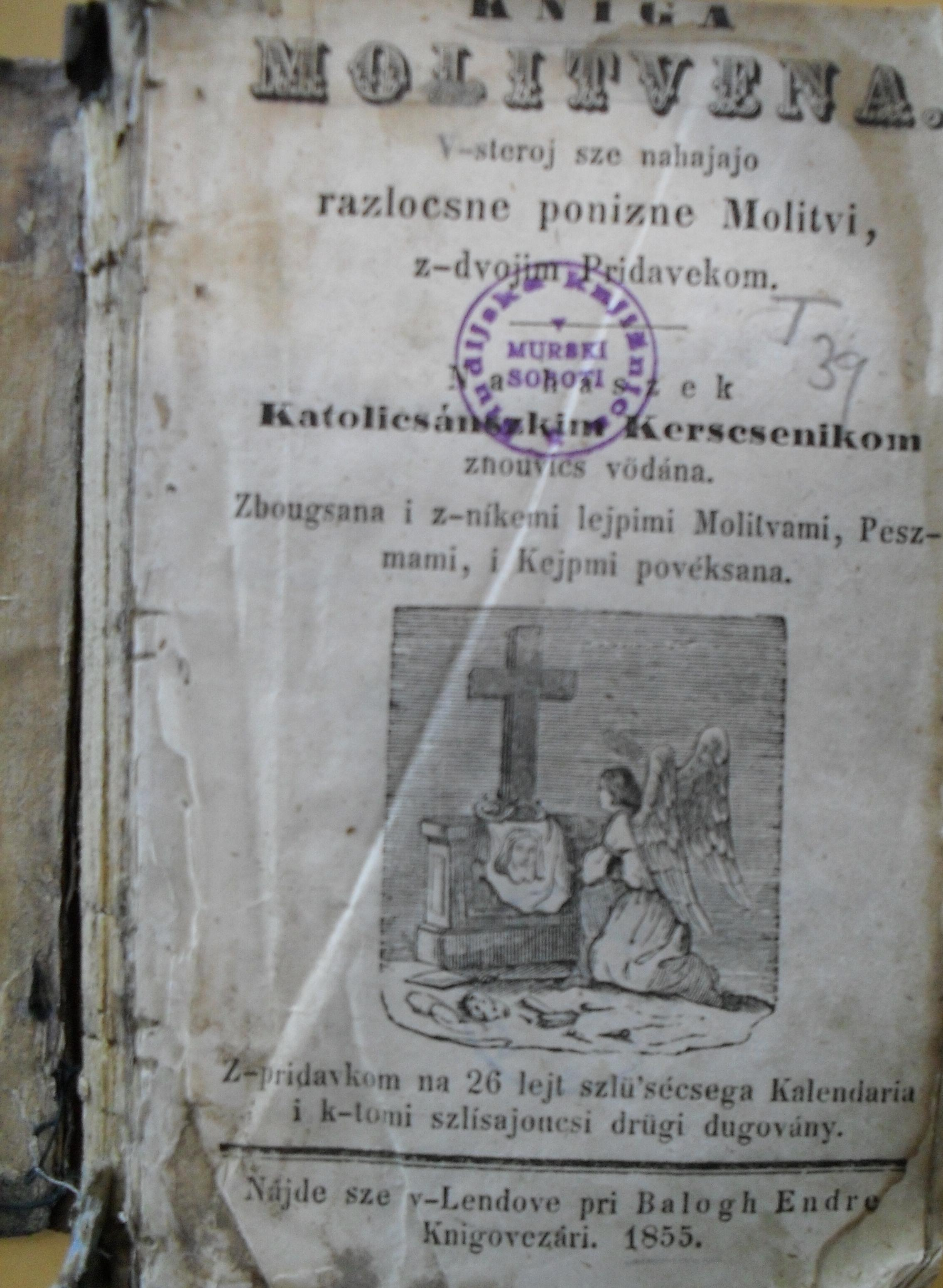
The famous Prekmurje Slovene prayer-book, the Kniga molitvena from 1855.

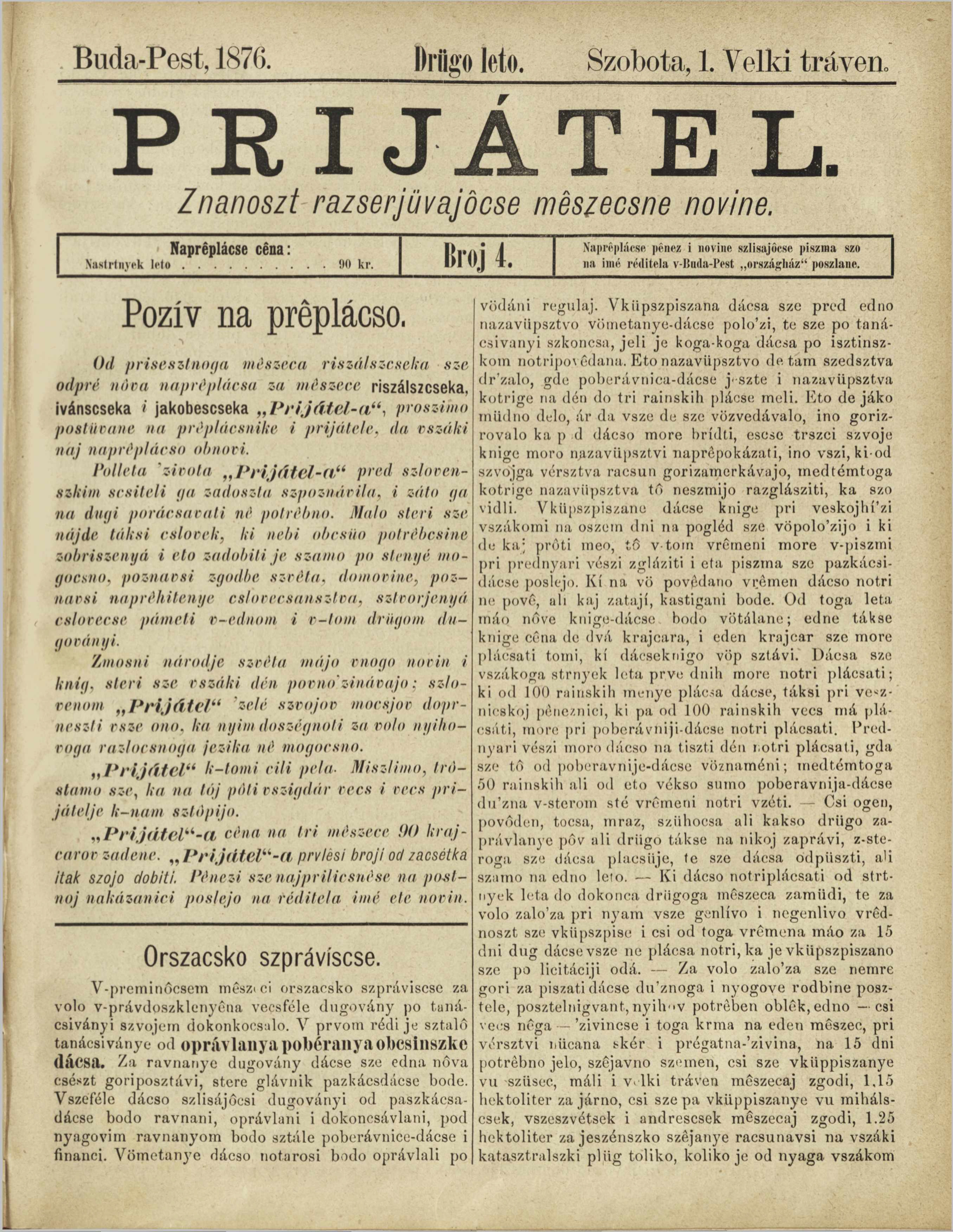
The first Prekmurje newspaper Prijátel (Friend) by Imre Augustich

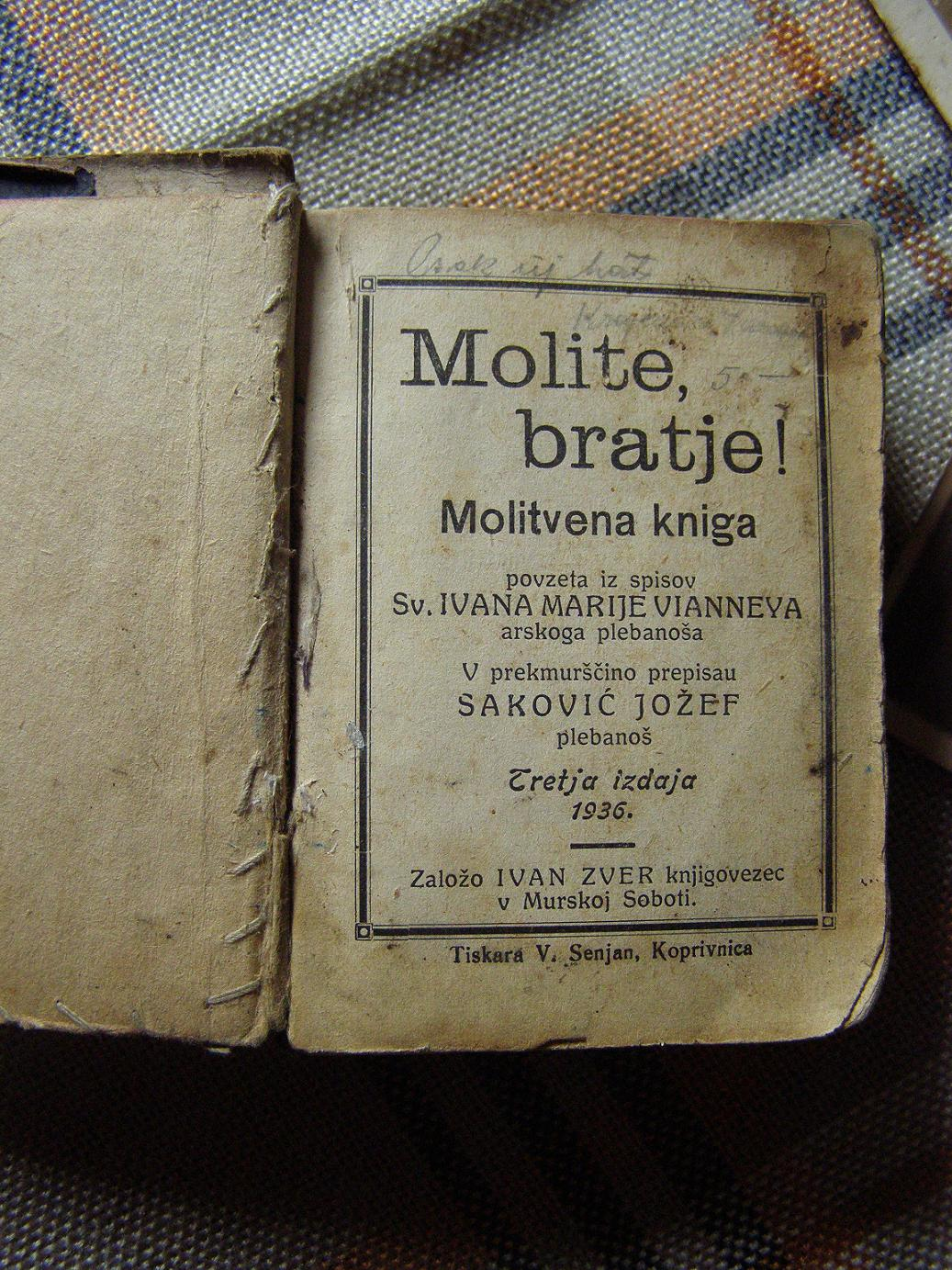
Pray my brothers! Prayer-book of József Szakovics in 1936. His script was written in the Slovene alphabet.

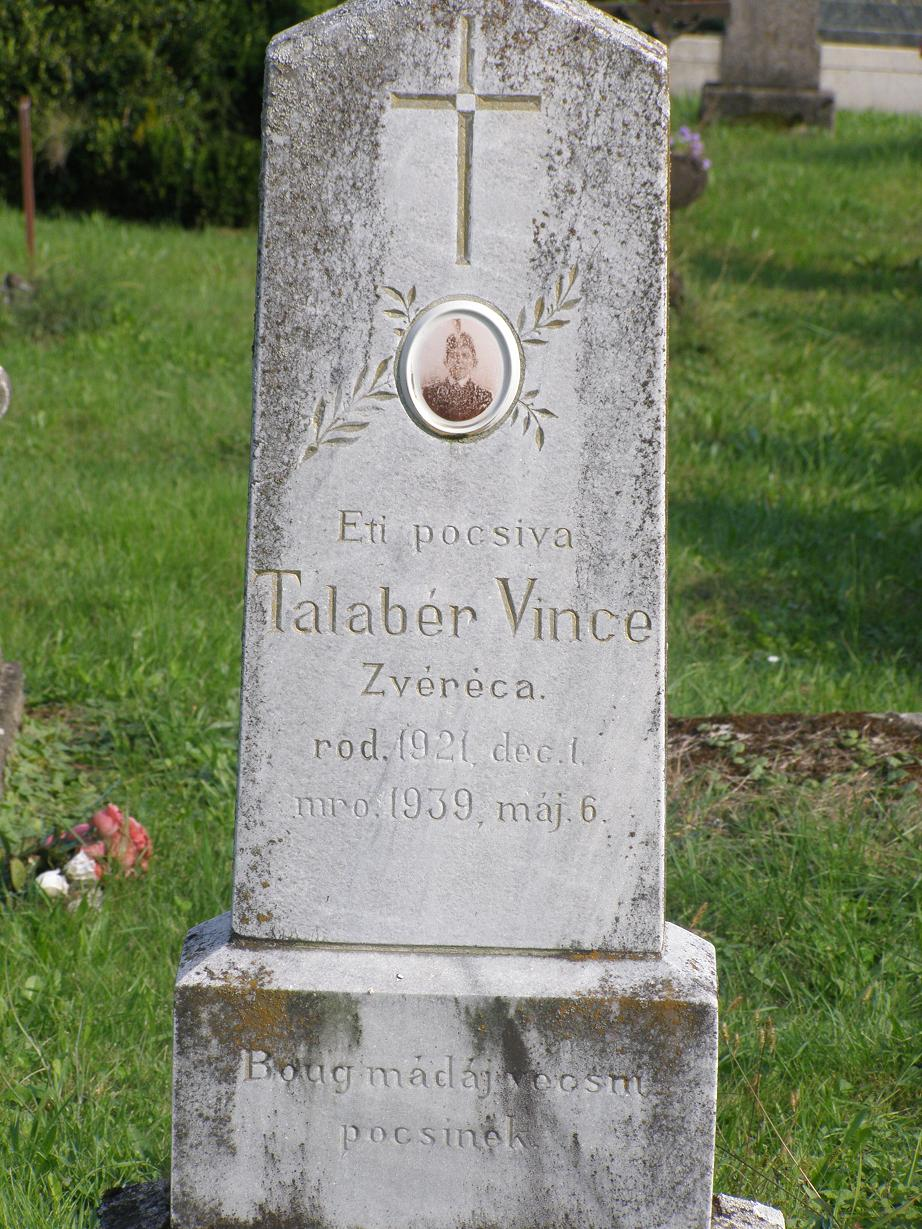
The tomb of the young Vince Talabér from Permise (Kétvölgy) in the cemetery of Apátistvánfalva with Prekmurje Slovene inscription.

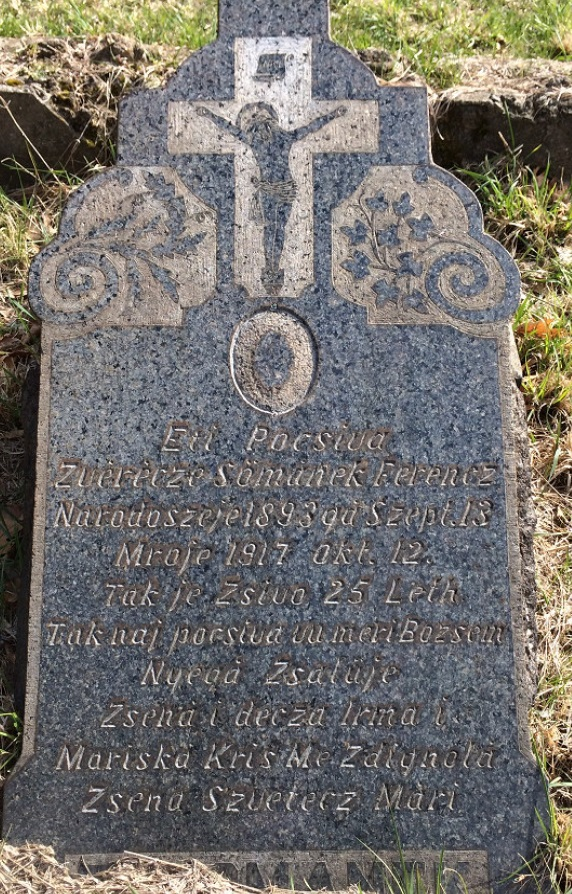
Prekmurje Slovene gravestone in the United States (St. Michael's Cemetery, South Bethlehem, Pennsylvania)

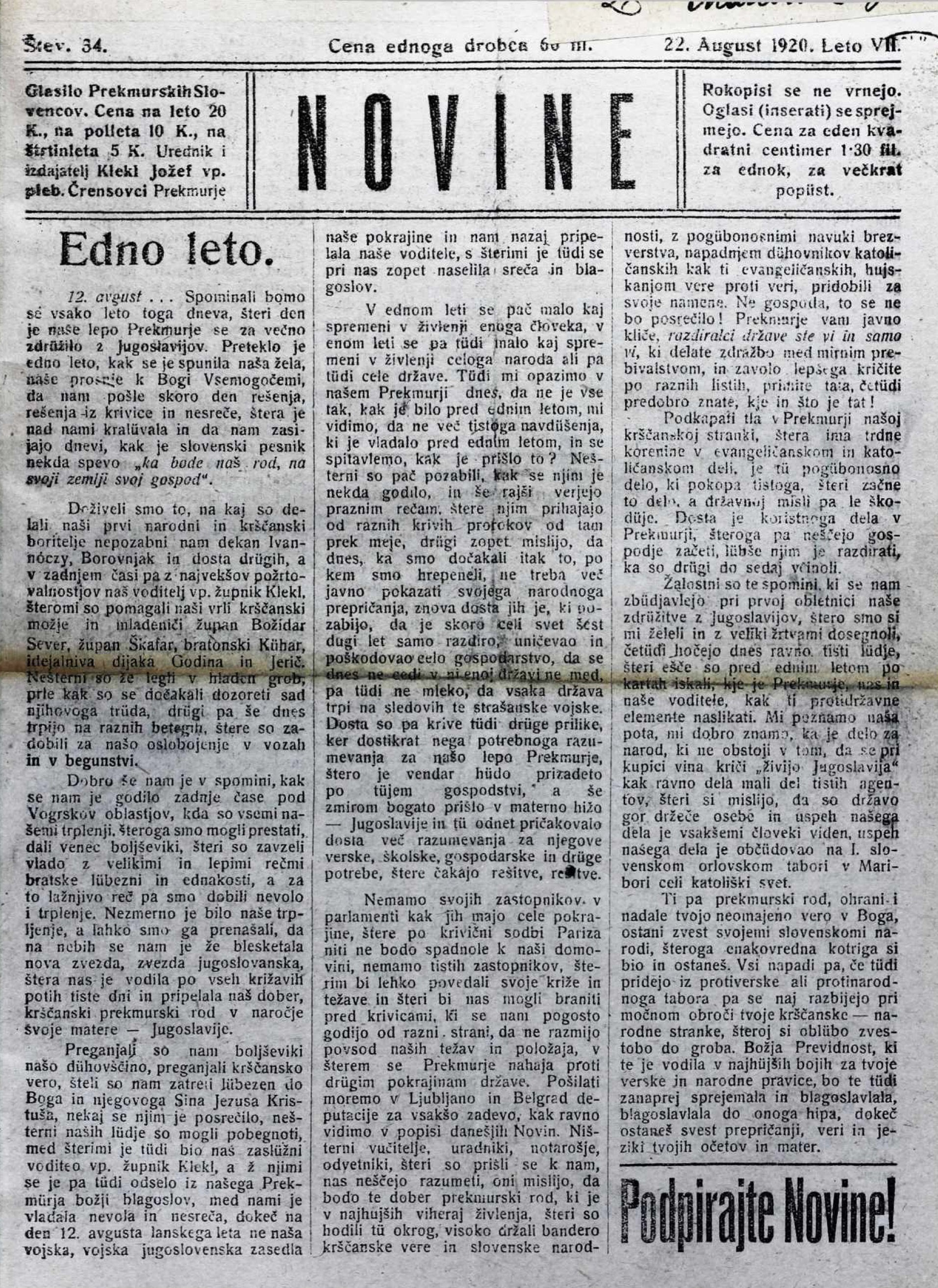
The most important Prekmurje Slovene-language newspaper Novine (1913–1941) by József Klekl

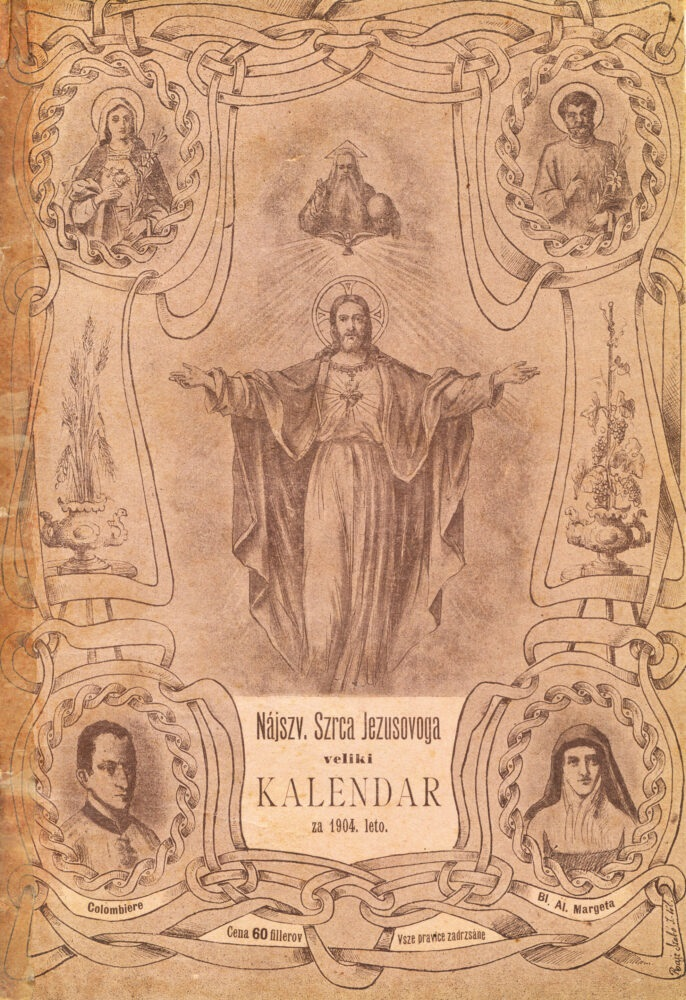
Kalendar Srca Jezušovoga (Jesus's Heart Calendar) was Prekmurje Catholic calendar between 1904 and 1944.

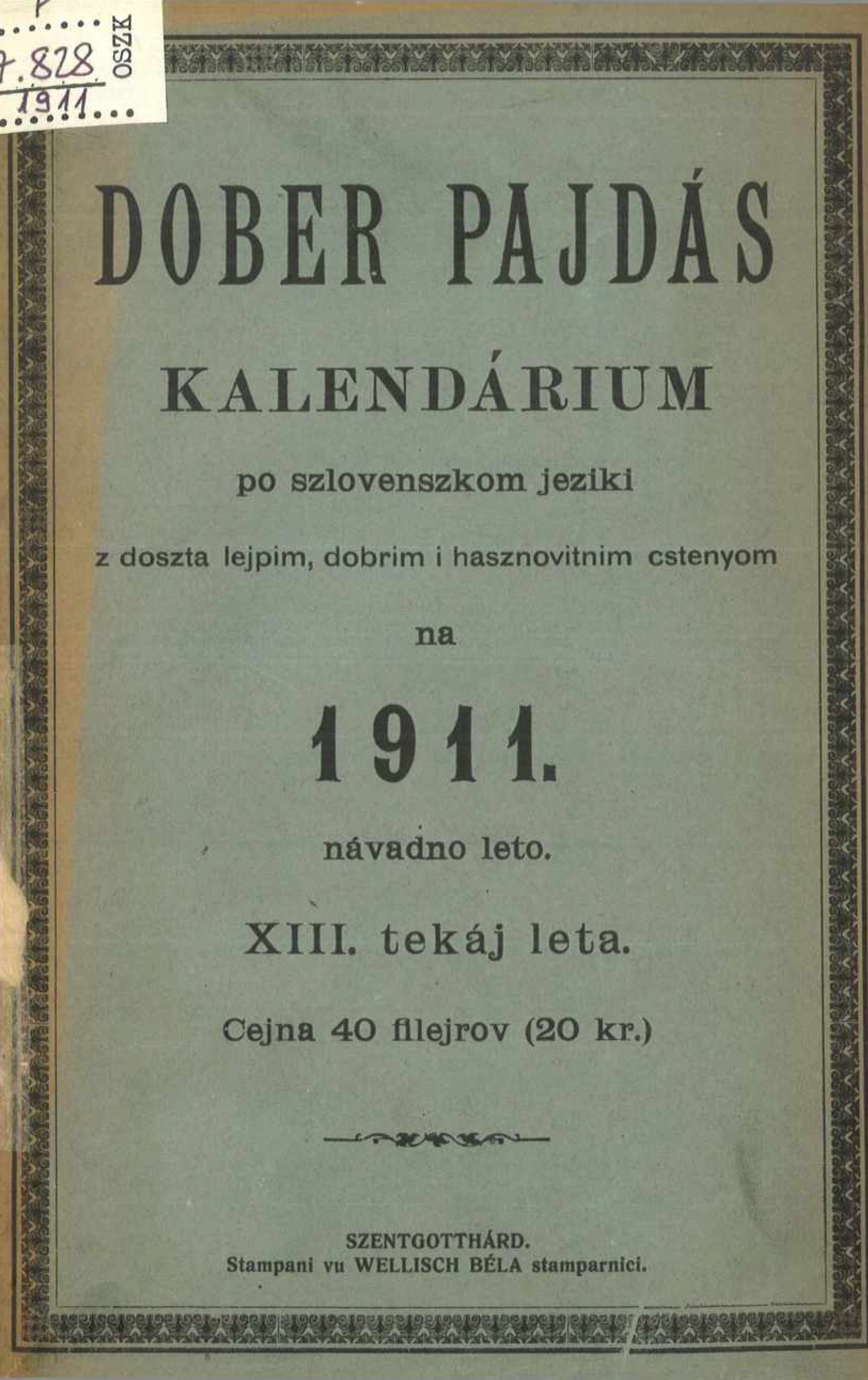
Dober pajdás kalendárium (Good Friend Calendar) from 1911. It contains various articles on politics, everyday life, literature and science

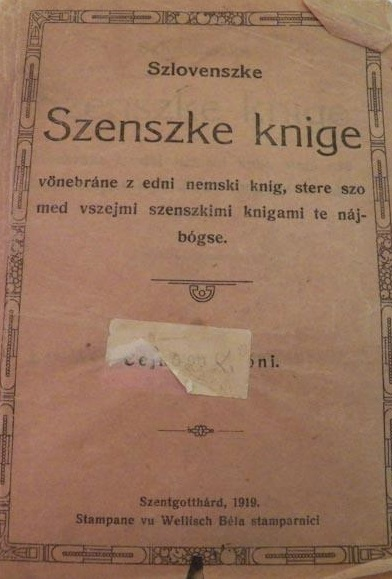
Oneiromancy in Prekmurje Slovene

== See also ==
- Languages of Slovenia
- List of Slovene writers and poets in Hungary
- Slovene March (Kingdom of Hungary)
- Vandalic language
- János Fliszár
- József Klekl (politician)
- Ágoston Pável

== Bibliography ==
- Dobrovoljc, Helena (2011). Prekmurščina. Prekmurje za radovedneže in ljubitelje. Uredil: Oto Luthar. Ljubljana: ZRC SAZU. pp. 22–26. ISBN 978-961-05-0058-2.
- Doncsecz, Etelka (2009). Deportálások a szentgotthárdi járásból az 1950-es években. Vasi honismereti és helytörténeti közlemények 2009/3. Szombathely: Vas Megyei Levéltár. pp. 76–89.
- Dončec, Akoš Anton (2018). Megyimurszki-szlovenszki — Nevjerojatna sudbina "međimurskoga jezika" (1. dio). Kaj: časopis za književnost, umjetnost, kulturu. Vol. 51 (240) No. 1-2 (350-351). Zagreb: Kajkavsko spravišče. pp. 55–81.
- Dončec, Akoš Anton (2023). Megyimurszki-szlovenszki — Nevjerojatna sudbina "međimurskoga jezika" (2. dio). Kaj: časopis za književnost, umjetnost, kulturu. Vol. 56 (255) No. 1-2 (380-381). Zagreb: Kajkavsko spravišče. pp. 49–80.
- Franček, Rudolf (1990). Kratka zgodovina Slovencev: legenda o strukturi. Ljubljana: Mladinska knjiga. ISBN 9788611054629.
- Greenberg, Marc L. (2020). Fortuin, Egbert; Houtzagers, Peter; Kalsbeek, Janneke (eds.). Prekmurje Slovene Grammar: Avgust Pavel's Vend nyelvtan (1942). Critical edition and translation from Hungarian by Marc L. Greenberg. Leiden, Boston: Brill Rodopi. ISBN 978-9004419117.
- Gutschimdt, Karl; Kempgen, Sebastian; Berger, Tilman; Kosta, Peter, eds. (2014). Die slavischen Sprachen/The Slavic Languages. Berlin, Munich, Boston: Walter de Gruyter GmbH. ISBN 978-3-11-017153-2.
- Hajdinjak, Maja (2020). Opis sodobne prekmurščine. Magistrsko delo. Ljubljana: Filozofska fakulteta Univerze v Ljubljani. Oddelek za slovenistiko.
- Haramija, Dragica (2019). "V knjižni prekmurščini objavljena neumetnostna gradiva v Marijikinem ogračku" (PDF). Slovenski Javni Govor in Jezikovno-kulturna (Samo)zavest: 397–406. doi:10.4312/Obdobja.38.397-406. ISBN 978-961-06-0259-0.
- Jesenšek, Marko (2010). Prekmuriana. Fejezetek a szlovén nyelv történetéből. Cathedra Philologiae Slavicae. Budapest: Balassi Kiadó. ISBN 978-963-506-846-3.
- Jesenšek, Marko (2013). Poglavja iz zgodovine prekmurskega knjižnega jezika. Maribor: Mednarodna založba Oddelka za slovanske jezike in književnosti, Filozofska fakulteta, Univerza v Mariboru. ISBN 978-961-6656-93-1.
- Jesenšek, Marko (2018). Prekmurski jezik med knjižno normo in narečjem. Maribor: Mednarodna založba Oddelka za slovanske jezike in književnosti, Filozofska fakulteta, Univerza v Mariboru. ISBN 978-961-286-222-0.
- Josipovič, Damir (2012). "Prekmurje in prekmurščina / Prekmurje (Trans-Mura region) and Prekmurian language". Združenje Pomurska akademsko znanstvena unija. 2: 92–102.
- Just, Franci (2000). Med verzuško in pesmijo. Poezija Prekmurja v prvi polovici 20. stoletja. Murska Sobota: Franc-Franc. ISBN 961-219-025-9.
- Just, Franci (2006). Panonski književni portreti 1. Prekmurje in Porabje A–I. Murska Sobota: Franc-Franc. ISBN 961-219-093-3.
- Koletnik, Mihaela (2001). Slovenskogoriško narečje. Maribor: Mednarodna založba Oddelka za slovanske jezike in književnosti, Filozofska fakulteta, Univerza v Mariboru. ISBN 961-6320-04-1.
- Kozár, Mária; Gyurácz, Ferenc (2001). Száz magyar falu: Felsőszölnök. Száz magyar falu könyvesháza Kht. ISBN 963-9287-20-2.
- Kuhar, Drago (1997). Prekmurska zgodba. Protestantiana v Prekmurijani, Kolobarijna Reformiana. Ljubljana: Self-publishing. ISBN 9789616073110.
- Kuzmič, Franc (1999). Bibliografija prekmurskih tiskov 1920–1998. Ljubljana: Založba ZRC. ISBN 961-6182-78-1.
- Kuzmič, Franc (2000). Petanjski grad v domačem tisku. Protestantizem – zatočišče izgnanih na Petanjcih. Ur. Jože Vugrinec. Petanjci: Ustanova dr. Šiftarjeva fundacija. Ljubljana: Znanstvenoraziskovalni center SAZU. pp. 75–84.
- Kuzmič, Franc (2008). Predgovor. Nouvi Zákon. Stevan Küzmics. Murska Sobota: Pokrajinski Muzej Murska Sobota. ISBN 978-961-6579-04-9.
- Kuzmič, Mihael (2001). Slovenski izseljenci iz Prekmurja v Bethlehemu v ZDA 1893–1924. Naselitev in njihove zgodovinske, socialne, politične, literarne in verske dejavnosti. Založba ZRC. ISBN 961-6358-38-3.
- Kuzmič, Mihael (2006). Prekmurski protestanti v 18. stoletju in njihva izselitev v artikularne kraje na Madžarskem. Podravina Volumen 5, broj 10. Koprivnica: Povijesno društvo Koprivnica. pp. 74–79.
- Kühar, Števan (1913). Slòvnica vogr̀sko-slovènskoga narêčja. Bratonci: Manuscript.
- Lončar, Nataša (2010). Ledinska in hišna imena v izbranih naseljih občine Cankova. Diplomsko delo. Maribor: Filozofska fakulteta Univerze v Mariboru. Oddelek za slovanske jezike in književnosti.
- Moguš, Milan (1977). Čakavsko narječje. Fonologija. Zagreb: Školska knjiga.
- Molnár, András; Mayer, László, eds. (2008). Viri za zgodovino Prekmurja 1./Források a Muravidék történetéhez 1. Szombathely, Zalaegerszeg, Maribor: Vas Megyei Levéltár, Zala Megyei Levéltár, Pokrajinski arhiv Maribor. ISBN 978-963-7227-19-6.
- Novak, Franc; Novak, Vilko (2009). Slovar beltinskega prekmurskega govora. Ponatis druge, popravljene in dopolnjene izdaje iz leta 1996, ki jo je priredil in uredil Vilko Novak. Murska Sobota: Pomurska založba. ISBN 978-961-249-068-3.
- Novak, Vilko (1976). Izbor prekmurskega slovstva. Ljubljana: Self-publishing.
- Novak, Vilko (1936). Izbor prekmurske književnosti. Cvetje iz domačih in tujih logov 9. Urejuje prof. Jakob Šolar s sodelovanjem uredniškega odbora. Celje: Družba Sv. Mohorja.
- Novak, Valentina (2013). Prekmurje, prekmurščina in regionalni razvoj : (analiza najbolj poslušane oddaje v prekmurščini na radiu Murski val) Diplomsko delo. Ljubljana: Filozofska fakulteta Univerze v Ljubljani.
- Rejc, Vladimira (2005). Čarovnija pisanja. Portreti slovenskih književnikov. Ljubljana: Beletrina. ISBN 978-961-242-040-6.
- Rešek, Dušan (1995). Brezglavjeki. Zgodbe iz Prekmurja. Ljubljana: ČZD Kmečki glas. ISBN 961-203-060-X.
- Smej, Jožef (1997). Se je Mikloš Küzmič v svojem prevodu evangyeliomov res naslanjal na Štefana Küzmiča? Slavistična revija letnik 45, številka 3/4. Ljubljana: Slavistično društvo Slovenije. pp. 533–544.
- Sonnenhauer, Barbara (2018). "Relativisation strategies in Slovene: Diachrony between language use and language description". Diachronic Slavonic Syntax. The Interplay Between Internal Development, Language Contact and Metalinguistic Factors. Berlin, Boston: Walter de Gruyter, Inc.: 387–406. doi:10.1515/9783110531435-014. ISBN 978-3-11-05-2929-6.
- Šebjanič, Franc (1978). The protestant movement of Slovenes in Pannonia. Translated by Király-Moss, Suzanne. Murska Sobota: Pomurska založba.
- Škafar, Ivan (1978). Jurančič, Janko (ed.). Bibliografija prekmurskih tiskov od 1715 do 1919. Ljubljana: Seja razreda za Filološke in literarne vede Slovenske Akademije znanosti in umetnosti.
- Škafar, Ivan (1977). "Sodelovanje dr. Franca Ivanocyja in Jožefa Klekla st. pri zemljevidu Slovenskega ozemlja (1921)" (PDF). Časopis za zgodovino in narodopisje. 1–2: 249–258.
- Toporišič, Jože (2004). Slovenska slovnica. Četrta, prenovljena in razširjena izdaja. Maribor: Založba Obzorja. ISBN 961-230-171-9.
- Trajber, Aleksander-Saša (2010). Germanizmi v prekmurskem narečju. Diplomsko delo. Maribor: Filozofska fakulteta Univerze v Mariboru. Oddelek za germanistiko.
- Trstenjak, Anton (2006). Slovenci na Ogrskem. Narodopisna in književna črtica, objava arhivskih virov. Maribor: Pokrajinski arhiv. ISBN 961-6507-09-5.
- Ulčnik, Natalija (2007). Bogastvo panonskega besedja. Slavistična revija. Letn. 55. Štev. 4. Ljubljana: Slavistično društvo Slovenije. pp. 675–679.
- Ulčnik, Natalija (2009). Začetki prekmurskega časopisja. Maribor: Mednarodna založba Oddelka za slovanske jezike in književnosti, Filozofska fakulteta, Univerza v Mariboru. ISBN 978-961-6656-40-5.
- Zorko, Zinka (1998). Haloško narečje in druge dialektološke študije. Maribor: Mednarodna založba Oddelka za slovanske jezike in književnosti, Filozofska fakulteta, Univerza v Mariboru. ISBN 961-90073-8-7.
- Zorko, Zinka (2009). Narečjeslovne razprave o koroških, štajerskih in panonskih govorih. Maribor: Mednarodna založba Oddelka za slovanske jezike in književnosti, Filozofska fakulteta, Univerza v Mariboru. ISBN 978-961-6656-37-5.
- Zver, Stanislav (2001). Jožef Klekl prekmurski Čedermac. Koper: Ognjišče. ISBN 961-6308-62-9.

== Sources ==
- Mária Mukics: Changing World - The Hungarian Slovenians (Változó Világ - A magyarországi szlovének) Press Publica
- Mukics Ferenc: Szlovén Nyelvkönyv/Slovenska slovnica (Slovenian language-book), 1997. ISBN 963-04-9261-X
- Vilko Novak Slovar stare knjižne prekmurščine, Založba ZRC, Ljubljana 2006. ISBN 961-6568-60-4
- Fliszár János: Magyar-vend szótár/Vogrszki-vendiski rêcsnik, Budapest 1922.
- Francek Mukič: Porabsko-knjižnoslovensko-madžarski slovar, Szombathely 2005. ISBN 963-217-762-2
- Greenberg, Marc L. (1989). "Ágost Pável's Prekmurje Slovene grammar" (PDF). Slavistična revija. 37 (1–3): 353–364.COBISS 15214592
- Greenberg, Marc L. (1992). "O pomiku praslovanskega cirkumfleksa v slovenščini in kajkavščini, s posebnim ozirom na razvoj v prekmurščini in sosednjih narečjih" [Circumflex advancement in Prekmurje and beyond] (PDF). Slovene Studies. 14 (1): 69–91.
- Marc L. Greenberg: Glasoslovni opis treh prekmurskih govorov in komentar k zgodovinskemu glasoslovju in oblikoglasju prekmurskega narečja. Slavistična revija 41/4 (1993), 465–487.
- Marc L. Greenberg: Archaisms and innovations in the dialect of Središče: (Southeastern Prlekija, Slovenia). Indiana Slavic studies 7 (1994), 90-102.
- Marc L. Greenberg: Prekmurje grammar as a source of Slavic comparative material. Slovenski jezik 7 (2009), 28-44.
- Marc L. Greenberg: Slovar beltinskega prekmurskega govora. Slavistična revija 36 (1988). 452–456. [Review essay of Franc Novak, Slovar beltinskega prekmurskega govora [A Dictionary of the Prekmurje Dialect of Beltinci].
- Vilko Novak: Slovar stare knjižne prekmurščine, Založba ZRC, Ljubljana, 2006. ISBN 961-6568-60-4
- Vilko Novak: Martjanska pesmarica, Založba ZRC, Ljubljana, 1997. ISBN 961-6182-27-7
- Vilko Novak: Zgodovina iz spomina/Történelem emlékezetből – Polemika o knjigi Tiborja Zsige Muravidéktől Trianonig/Polémia Zsiga Tibor Muravidéktől Trianonig című könyvéről, Založba ZRC, Ljubljana, 2004. ISBN 961-6500-34-1
- Marija Kozar: Etnološki slovar slovencev na Madžarskem, Monošter-Szombathely 1996. ISBN 963-7206-62-0
- Források a Muravidék történetéhez 1./Viri za zgodovino Prekmurja 1. Szombathely-Zalaegerszeg, 2008. ISBN 978-963-7227-19-6 Ö
- Források a Muravidék történetéhez/Viri za zgodovino Prekmurja 2. Szombathely-Zalaegerszeg 2008. ISBN 978-963-7227-19-6
- Molitvena Kniga, Odobrena od cérkvene oblászti, edit: József Szakovics 1942.
- Pokrajinski muzej Murska Sobota, Katalog stalne razstave, Murska Sobota 1997. ISBN 961-90438-1-2
- Jerneja Kopitarja Glagolita Clozianus/Cločev Glagolit, Ljubljana 1995. ISBN 86-7207-078-X
- Življenje in delo Jožefa Borovnjaka, Edit: Marko Jesenšek, Maribor 2008.
- Bea Baboš Logar: Prekmurska narečna slovstvena ustvarjalnost – mednarodno znanstveno srečanje: prekmurščina zanimiva tudi za tuje znanstvenike, Vestnik July 17, 2003.
- Predgovor. Nouvi Zákon, Stevan Küzmics, Pokrajinski Muzej Murska Sobota 2008. ISBN 978-961-6579-04-9 (Translations: in English Peter Lamovec; in Hungarian Gabriella Bence; in Slovene Mihael Kuzmič)
