= Hodoš =

Hodoš Hodos (Hungarian)
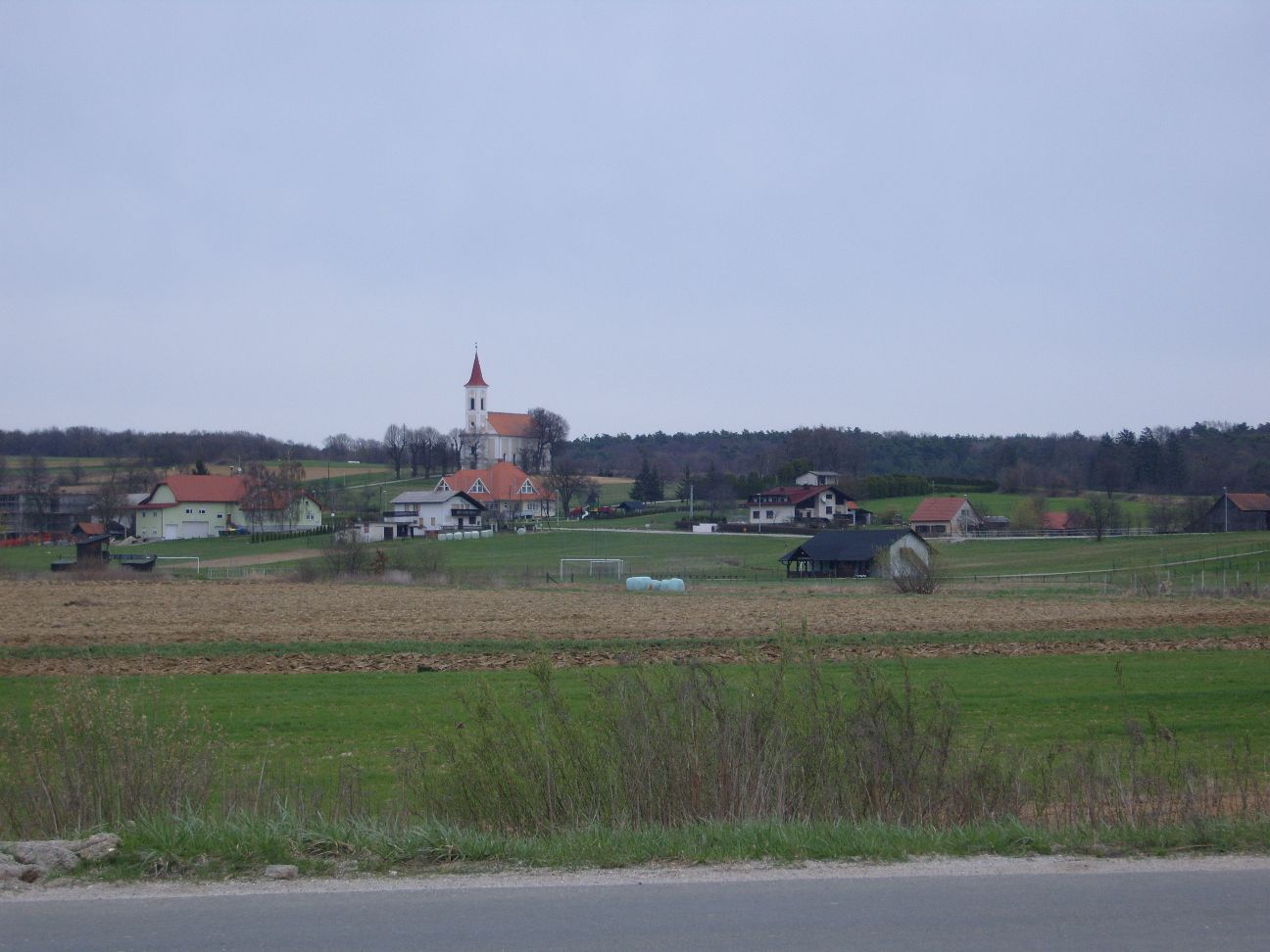

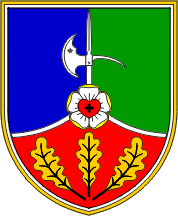
- Coat of arms

- Location in Slovenia
- Coordinates: 46°49′42.50″N 16°19′26.00″E
- Country: Slovenia
- Traditional region: Prekmurje
- Statistical region: Mura
- Municipality: Hodoš

Area
  - Total: 12.5 km^{2} (4.8 sq mi)
- Elevation: 258 m (846 ft)

Population (2012)
  - Total: 280

Hodoš (pronounced [ˈxóːdɔʃ]; Hungarian: Hodos or Őrihodos, German: Hodosch) is a village in Slovenia. It is the seat of the Municipality of Hodoš. It is part of the Prekmurje region.

== Name ==
Hodoš was first mentioned in written sources in 1331 as de Hudus-feu (and as Hodos in 1452 and 1453). The name is probably based on the hypocorism *Xodošь, from the Slavic personal name *Xodъ. A less likely possibility is that the name is derived from the Hungarian common noun hód 'beaver'.

== Mass graves ==
Hodoš is the site of two known mass graves associated with the Second World War and immediate postwar period. The Cold Valley Mass Grave (Slovene: Grobišče Mrzla dolina) is located in the woods northwest of Hodoš, southwest of a small lake, in a ravine known as the Cold Valley (Mrzla dolina, Hungarian: Hideg-völgy). It contains the remains of seven or eight ethnic Hungarians (or possibly German soldiers) that were killed when the Red Army arrived in April 1945. The Barracks Mass Grave (Grobišče pri vojašnici) is located north of Hodoš, about 75 meters (246 ft) from the Hungarian border. It contains the remains of a group of Hungarians that illegally crossed the border in 1945. They were shot and their bodies were thrown into an abandoned well.

== Notable people ==
Notable people that were born or lived in Hodoš include:

- Jurij Cipot (1794–1834), religious writer
- Rudolf Cipot (1825–1901), religious writer
- János Kardos (a.k.a. Janoš Kardoš) (1801–1875), Lutheran priest, teacher, and writer
