= Ferenc Temlin =

Ferenc Temlin, known in Slovenian as Franc Temlin, was a Slovenian Lutheran pastor in the Kingdom of Hungary in the 18th century.

Temlin was born in the village of Krajna (Hung. Véghely) in the Prekmurje region of the Kingdom of Hungary. The exact date of his birth is unknown. He wrote the first book in the Prekmurje Slovene. This was Mali katechismus ("Small Catechism"), published in the German town of Halle in 1715.

== See also ==
- List of Slovene writers and poets in Hungary

== Literature ==
- Jesenšek, Marko (2013). Poglavja iz zgodovine prekmurskega knjižnega jezika. Maribor: Mednarodna založba Oddelka za slovanske jezike in književnosti, Filozofska fakulteta, Univerza v Mariboru. ISBN 978-961-6656-93-1.
