= Bratonci =

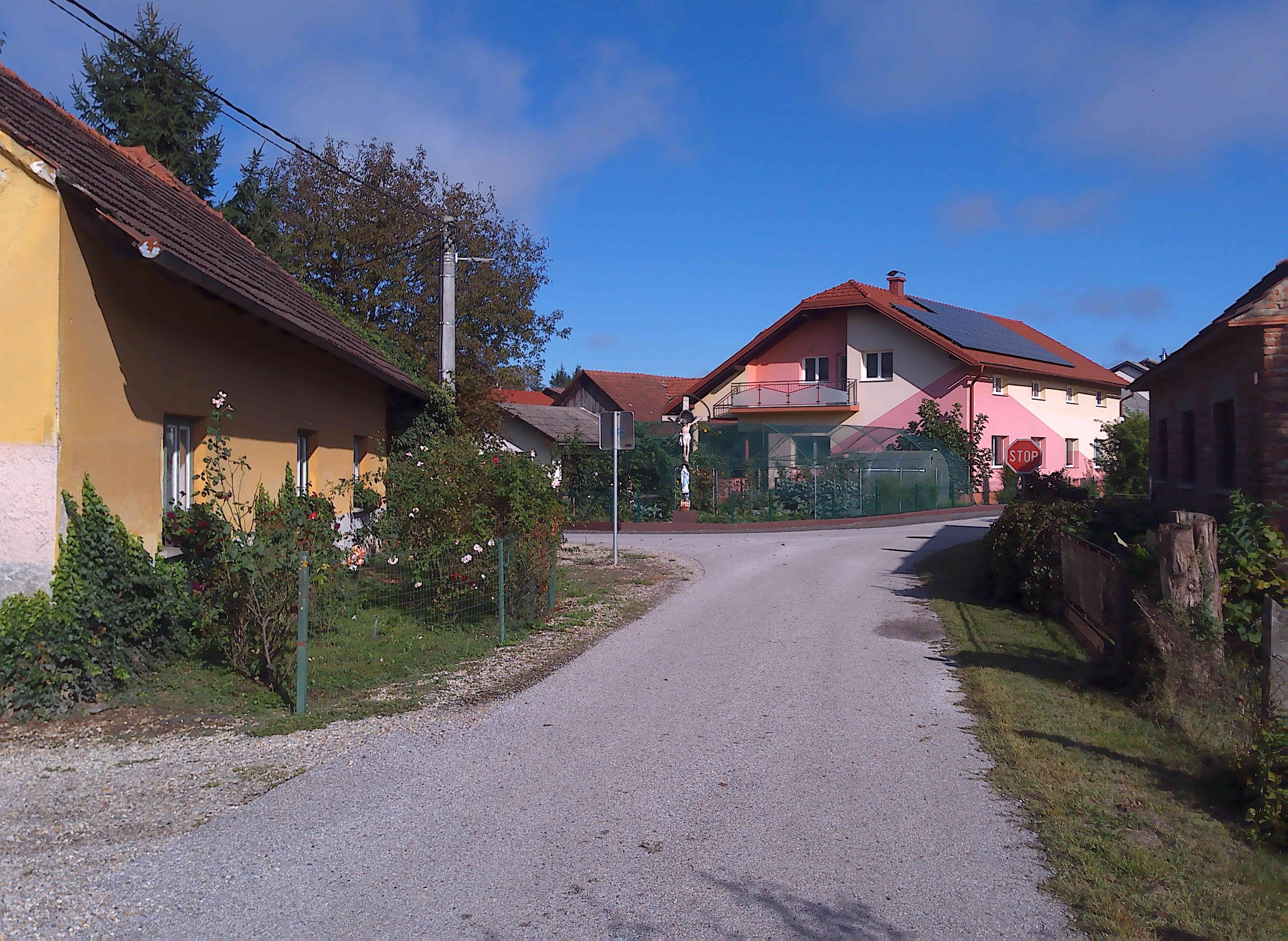

- Location in Slovenia
- Coordinates: 46°37′5.51″N 16°12′55.77″E
- Country: Slovenia
- Traditional region: Prekmurje
- Statistical region: Mura
- Municipality: Beltinci

Area
  - Total: 3.18 km^{2} (1.23 sq mi)
- Elevation: 180.4 m (592 ft)

Population (2026)
  - Total: 663
  - Density: 208/km^{2} (540/sq mi)

Bratonci (pronounced [ˈbɾaːtɔntsi]; Hungarian: Murabaráti, German: Neuhof) is a village in the Municipality of Beltinci in the Prekmurje region of northeastern Slovenia. Črnec Creek, a tributary of the Ledava, flows through the settlement. In January 2026, the population was 663.

There is a small church in the settlement. It was built in 1898 and is dedicated to Mary Help of Christians and belongs to the Parish of Beltinci.

The writer István Kühár was born in Bratonci.
