= János Kardos =

Hungarian writer (1801–1875)

János Kardos, also known in Slovene as Janoš Kardoš (around February 13, 1801 – August 12, 1875) was a Hungarian Slovenian Lutheran priest, teacher, and writer.

He was born in Újtölgyes, Kingdom of Hungary, today Noršinci, Slovenia. He worked, lived and died in Őrihodos, Austria-Hungary, today Hodoš, Slovenia, in what was then known as the Slovene March and is today referred to as Prekmurje. After finishing studies in theology in Vienna, he returned to his homeland and wrote and translated several ecclesiastical books and schoolbooks. Kardos was the first to translate works by Hungarian writers and poets from Hungarian into the Prekmurje Slovene. Among others, he translated works by Sándor Petőfi, János Arany, Mór Jókai, Sándor Kisfaludy, and Mihály Vörösmarty.

== Works ==
- D. Luther Martina máli kátekismus ali glavni návuk szvéte vere krsztsanszke (Martin Luther's Little Catechism, or the Main Tenet of the Holy Christian Religion, 1837)
- Krátki návuk krsztsansztva (Little Tenet of Christianity, 1837)
- Mála historia bibliszka ali Sz. Píszma Mêsta prígodna (Little History of the Bible, 1840)
- Krsztsanszke czerkevne peszmi (Christian Hymns, 1848)
- Krsztsanszke mrtvecsne peszmi (Christian Dirges, 1848)
- Mrtvecsne nôve molitvi (New Prayers for the Dead, manuscript 1850)
- Pobo'zne molítvi za poszebno csészt bo'zo (1853)
- Krsztsanszke mrtvecsne peszmi (1855)
- ABC ali Návuk na píszajôcs-cstenyé za szlovenszke vucsevnice vödáni (Primer for Writing and Reading for Slovene Scholars, 1867)
- D. Luther Martina máli kátekismus ali glavni návuk szvéte vere krsztsanszke (1875)
- Krsztsanszke czerkevne peszmi (1875)
- D. Luther Martina Máli kátekismus ali Glávni návuk szvéte vere krsztsanszke (1902)
- Krsztsanszke czerkevne peszmi (1908)
- Toldi: versusko pripovedávanje (Toldi: A Rhyming Narrative, 1921)
- Moses i Josua (Moses and Joshua, 1926–1927), published in the Lutheran periodical Düševni list
- Krsztsanszke mrtvecsne peszmi (1929)
- Evangeliomszke vere ino cérkvi obcsinszki prigodi (1932)

== See also ==
- List of Slovene writers and poets in Hungary
