= István Lülik =

István Lülik (Slovene: Števan Lülik) (1764 – March 30, 1847) was a Lutheran schoolmaster in the Prekmurje region of the Kingdom of Hungary, today in Slovenia, in the 19th century. He lived and worked in Puconci, near Murska Sobota.

He was born in Strukovci. He taught in a school in Rajka and later moved to the Mura March. In 1833 he translated a textbook from German into Hungarian and the local Prekmurje Slovene dialect. One of the topics of this book is the Mura March, which he calls Szlovenszka kraina in his native language because the inhabitants of the region called themselves szloveni (Slovenes). In the Hungarian version of the book, he calls them vandalus (Vandals) because Hungarian Slovenes living near the rivers Mura and Rába were thought to be descendants of the Vandals.

Three editions of the book were published for use Lutheran schools in Prekmurje. Lülik died in 1847.

== His work ==
- Novi abeczedár z- nisteri nemski táksi kni'zecz vküp pobráni, i na szlovenszki jezik preobernyem p. L. S. P. S Stampani v- M. Óvári pri Czéh Sándori z sztroskom Balog Andrása knígvezárá

== See also ==
- List of Slovene writers and poets in Hungary

== Sources ==
- mkozar
- Anton Trstenjak: Slovenci na Ogrskem: Narodopisna in književna črtica, Objava arhivskih virov, Maribor, 2006.
- Digitalna zbirka
