= József Kossics =

József Kossics, also known in Slovene as Jožef Košič (around October 9, 1788, Bogojina, Austria-Hungary – December 26, 1867, Felsőszölnök), was a Hungarian-Slovenian writer, Catholic priest, ethnologist, linguist and historian.

Kossics was born in Bogojina, Moravske Toplice, then part of the Kingdom of Hungary, now in Slovenia. His father József Kossics was a teacher born in Varaždin and his mother Ana Kregar was from a petty noble family.

Kossics served as a priest in the first half of the 19th century in Alsószölnök and later in Felsőszölnök (1829–1867) in Vas country. He was also a poet, linguist, historian, and ethnologist. He was a subscriber to the early Hungarian scholarly journal Tudományos gyűjtemény (Scientific Collection, 1817–1841). In 1828, his monograph on the Hungarian Slovenes appeared in this journal, earning him respect in ethnological circles. Kossics continued to attentively follow developments in Hungarian science and culture.

In his pursuit of promoting the special features of ethnic groups, he later became something of an activist. In 1837, he joined an appeal for a poem from every ethnic group living in the Kingdom of Hungary to be read in the respective languages for the opening of the Hungarian National Theater in Pest. For this purpose, Kossics himself wrote a poem in his native Slovene and added a rough Hungarian translation.

Kossics died in 1867 in Felsőszölnök.

== See also ==
- List of Slovene writers and poets in Hungary
- Prekmurje
