= Dolenci =

Dolenci may refer to:

- Dolenci, Slovenia, a village in Prekmurje, Slovenia
- Dolenci, Croatia, a village near Vrbovsko, Croatia
- Dolenci, Demir Hisar, a village in Demir Hisar municipality, Republic of Macedonia
- Dolenci, Bitola, a village in Bitola Municipality, Republic of Macedonia
- Bigor Dolenci, a village in Kičevo Municipality, Republic of Macedonia
- Manastirsko Dolenci, a village in Kičevo Municipality, Republic of Macedonia
- Dolenci, Lupoglav, a hamlet of Lupoglav, Zagreb County, Croatia
- Dolenci, Donji Stupnik, a hamlet of Donji Stupnik, Croatia
- Dolenci, Završje, a hamlet of Završje, Primorje-Gorski Kotar County, Croatia
