= József Konkolics =

Hungarian Slovene writer

József Konkolics (Slovene: Jožef Konkolič) (March 12, 1861 – January 1, 1941) was a Hungarian Slovene writer and cantor, and an associate of Miklós Kovács. Both authors wrote a hymnal in Prekmurje Slovene, which has not survived.

Konkolics was born in Mali Dolenci (today Dolenci, Prekmurje) in the Kingdom of Hungary, the son of the farmer Ádám Konkolics and Mária Nemes. In 1910 Konkolics and Kovács contributed to the appearance of János Zsupánek's hymnal Mrtvecsne peszmi, which also supported the politician József Klekl and his cousin József Klekl Jr., the priest in Dolenci.

He died and is buried in Šalovci.

== See also ==
- List of Slovene writers and poets in Hungary
- Old hymnal of Martjanci
- Mihály Zsupánek
