= Zsupánek =

Zsupánek is a surname. Notable people with the surname include:

- János Zsupánek (1861–1951), Slovenian writer and poet
- Mihály Zsupánek (1830–1898/1905), Slovenian poet, father of János
