= Bigor Dolenci =

Bigor Dolenci Бигор Доленци
- Village
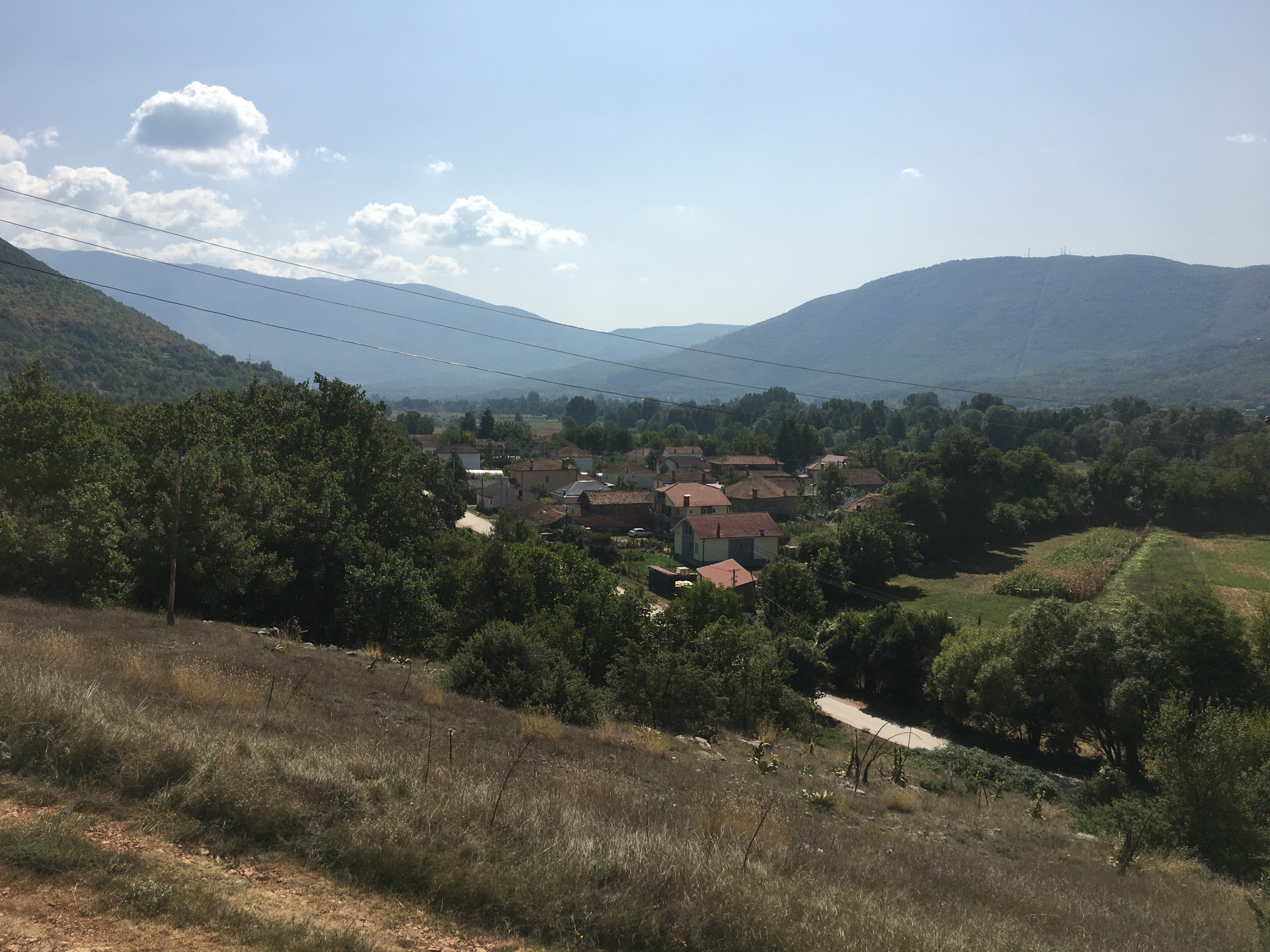
- View of the village Bigor Dolenci

- Location within North Macedonia
- Coordinates: 41.488908°N 20.986981°E
- Country: North Macedonia
- Region: Southwestern
- Municipality: Kičevo

Population (2002)
  - Total: 156
- Time zone: UTC+1 (CET)
  - Summer (DST): UTC+2 (CEST)
- Website: .

Bigor Dolenci (Macedonian: Бигор Доленци) is a village in the municipality of Kičevo, North Macedonia. It used to be part of the former Vraneštica Municipality.

== Name ==
Dolenci is also the name of a village in Prekmurje, a village in Gorski Kotar, several other villages near Ohrid and Prespa (Dolenci, Bitola, Dolenci, Demir Hisar, Manastirsko Dolenci), a hamlet of Donji Stupnik, a hamlet of Lupoglav, and a hamlet of nearby Završje.

== Demographics ==
According to the 2002 census, the village had a total of 156 inhabitants. Ethnic groups in the village include:

- Macedonians 156
