= Dolenci, Bitola =

Dolenci Доленци Dollenckë
- Village
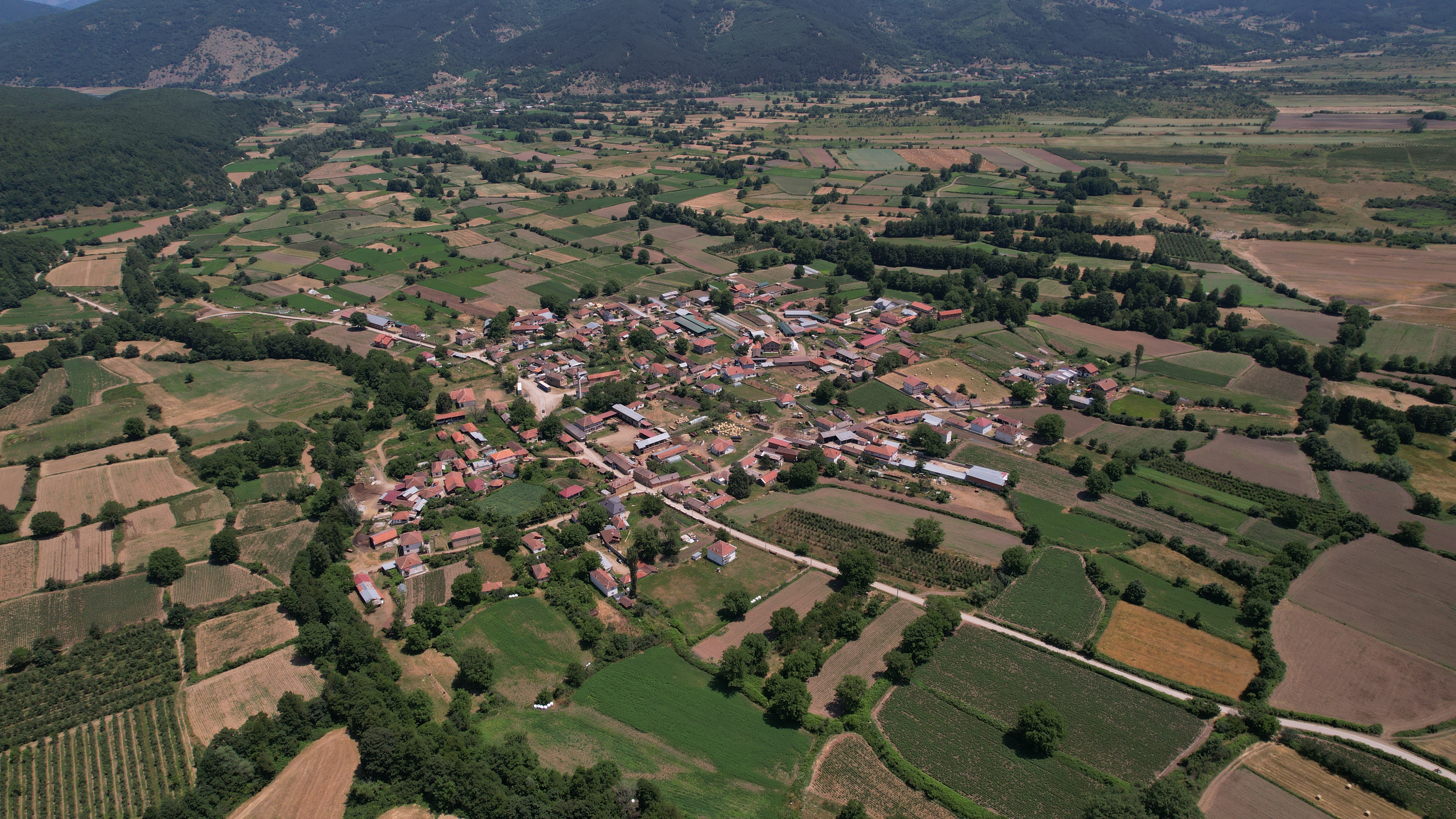
- Air view of the village

- Location within North Macedonia
- Coordinates: 41.0839°N 21.1550°E
- Country: North Macedonia
- Region: Pelagonia
- Municipality: Bitola

Population (2002)
  - Total: 265
- Time zone: UTC+1 (CET)
  - Summer (DST): UTC+2 (CEST)
- Car plates: BT
- Website: .

Dolenci (Macedonian: Доленци; Albanian: Dollenckë) is a village in the municipality of Bitola, North Macedonia. It used to be part of the former municipality of Capari.

== Name ==
Dolenci is also the name of a village in Prekmurje, a village in Gorski Kotar, several other villages near Ohrid and Prespa (Dolenci, Demir Hisar, Bigor Dolenci, Manastirsko Dolenci), a hamlet of Donji Stupnik, a hamlet of Lupoglav, and a hamlet of nearby Završje.

== Demographics ==
The Albanian population of Dolenci are Tosks, a subgroup of southern Albanians.

According to the 2002 census, the village had a total of 265 inhabitants. Ethnic groups in the village include:

- Albanians 212
- Macedonians 51
- Bosniaks 1
- Others 1
