= Lupoglav (disambiguation) =

Lupoglav can refer to:

- Lupoglav, Istria County, a village and a municipality in Croatia
- Lupoglav, Zagreb County, a village in the Brckovljani municipality, Croatia
- Lupoglav, Žepče, a village in Bosnia and Herzegovina

== See also ==
- Lepoglava
