= Elza Polak =

Yugoslav horticulturist (1910–1995)

Polak in 1979

Elza Polak (25 May 1910 – 1 January 1995) was a Yugoslav horticulturist and gardener. She is considered one of the pioneers of modern horticulture in Croatia.

== Education and early career ==
Polak was born in Ogulin on 25 May 1910. "A love for flowers and nature", as she put it, led her to study agronomy at the University of Zagreb. As a student, she became a member of Zagreb's horticultural society, where she took gardening classes.

Upon graduating in 1933, Polak started working as a teacher and engineer at the School of Gardening in Božjakovina, a village near Brckovljani, the only such institution in Yugoslavia. Her colleague at the school was Ciril Jeglič, whom she much appreciated. She instructed several generations of gardeners in plant production and garden design before being appointed gardening referee by the government of the Banovina of Croatia in Zagreb in 1940.

== Wartime activities ==
Being a Jew, Polak was fired and shunned following the Nazi invasion of Yugoslavia in 1941. While her brother Leo was shot the same year, Polak survived and procured a part-time job at the School of Gardening in Božjakovina in 1943. She seized that opportunity to leave the occupied territory together with all her students and flee to the land controlled by the Partisans, the resistance movement of Yugoslavia. Recognizing her value, the State Anti-fascist Council for the National Liberation of Croatia employed her in Slunj as an agronomist. Her task was producing food for military hospitals and orphanages. Polak was in charge of the network of the resistance movement gardens stretching from Banija to Istria, Croatian Littoral, and northern Dalmatia; she founded about 100 such gardens.

== Academic career ==
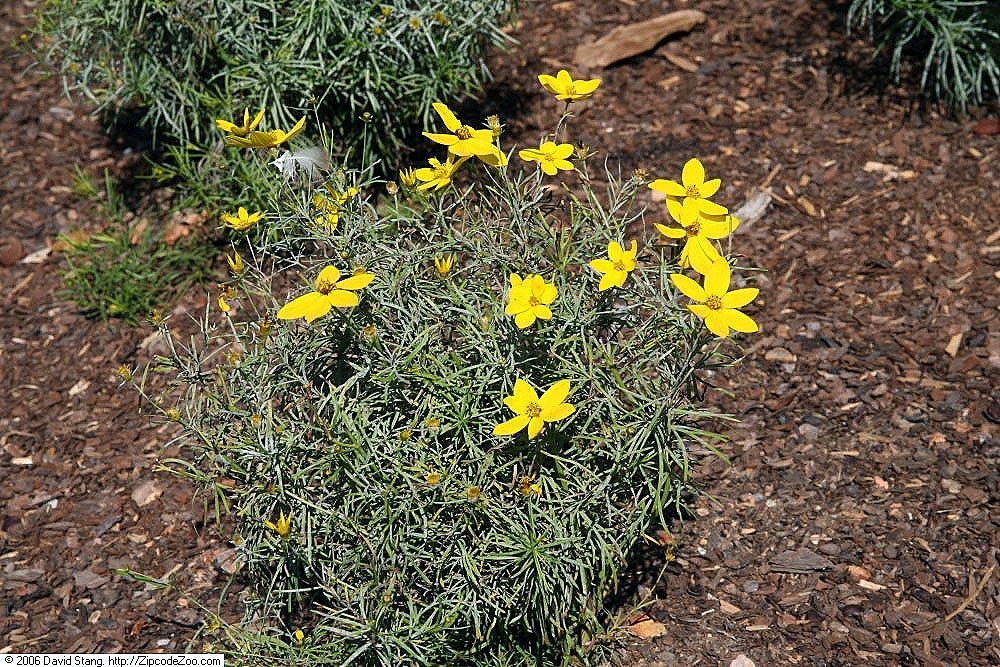
Coreopsis verticillata 'Zagreb', developed by Polak

In the immediate aftermath of the Liberation of Yugoslavia, Polak worked for the Yugoslav Ministry of Agriculture and as a high school principal in Brezovica. In 1947, she was employed by the Faculty of Agriculture in Zagreb. Starting in 1955, Polak worked on the development of new sorts of ornamental plants, including four new sorts of gladioli. She worked on other perennial plants as well, creating Coreopsis verticillata 'Zagreb'. She became a full professor in 1962, teaching vegetable farming, floriculture, and production of ornamental plants. Polak was one of the founders of the Horticultural Association of Croatia and of the interdisciplinary postgraduate program of landscape architecture. From 1966, she was a member of the International Hardy Plants Union. She retired in 1970.

Polak died in Zagreb on 1 January 1995. She is regarded as one of the pioneers of modern horticulture in Croatia.
