= Manastirsko Dolenci =

Manastirsko Dolenci Манастирско Доленци
- Village
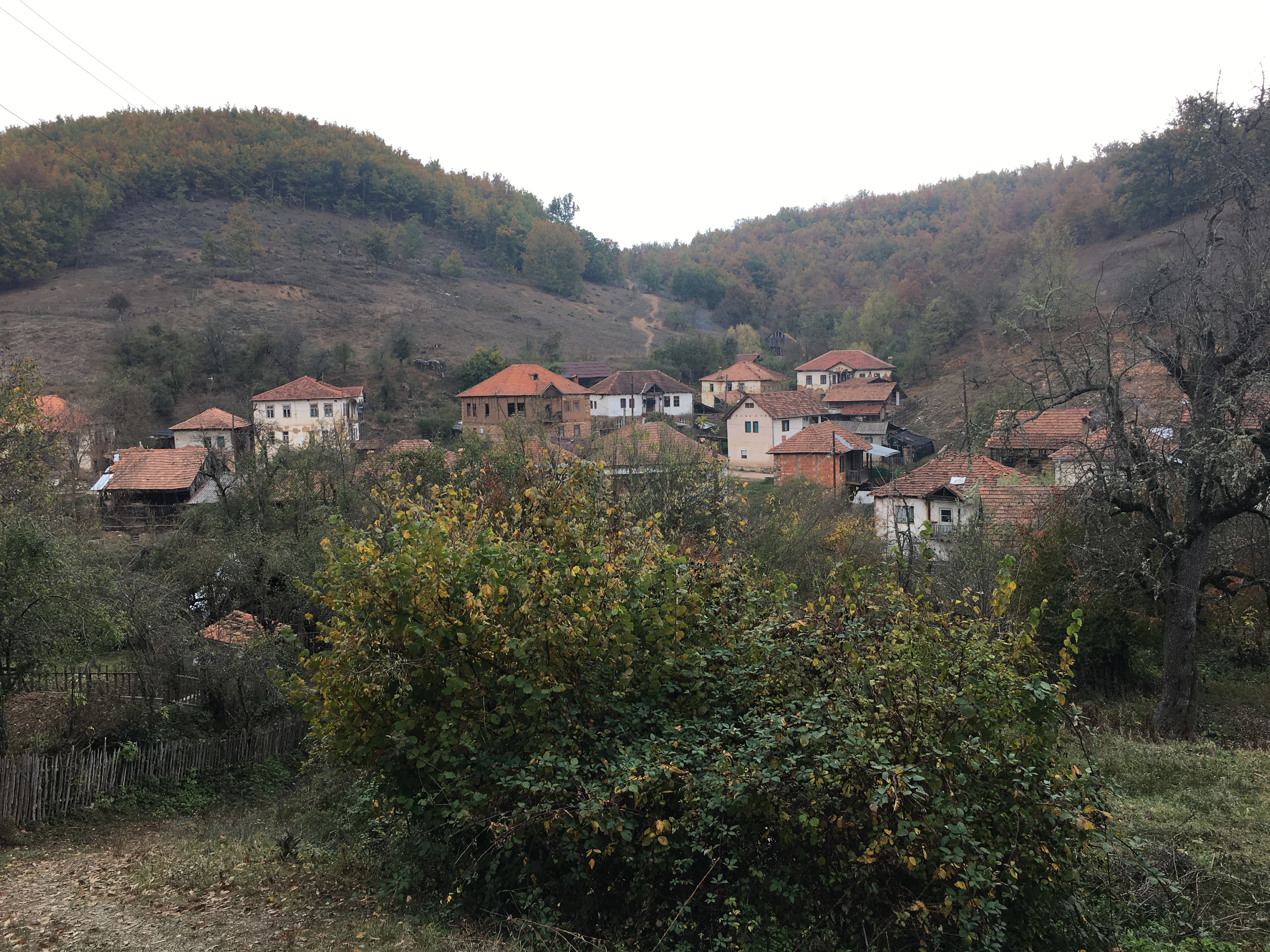

- Location within North Macedonia
- Coordinates: 41.472169°N 20.945171°E
- Country: North Macedonia
- Region: Southwestern
- Municipality: Kičevo

Population (2002)
  - Total: 109
- Time zone: UTC+1 (CET)
  - Summer (DST): UTC+2 (CEST)
- Website: .

Manastirsko Dolenci (Macedonian: Манастирско Доленци) is a village in the municipality of Kičevo, North Macedonia. It used to be part of the former Drugovo Municipality. It is home to the 14th-century Kičevo Monastery.

== Name ==
Dolenci is also the name of a village in Prekmurje, a village in Gorski Kotar, several other villages near Ohrid and Prespa (Dolenci, Bitola, Dolenci, Demir Hisar, Bigor Dolenci), a hamlet of Donji Stupnik, a hamlet of Lupoglav, and a hamlet of nearby Završje.

== History ==
Manastirsko Dolenci is attested in the 1467/68 Ottoman tax registry (defter) for the Nahiyah of Kırçova. The village had a total of 44 households.

According to the 1942 Albanian census, Manastirsko Dolenci was inhabited by a total of 228 Bulgarians.

There are nine archaeological sites within Manastrisko Dolenci. One of these is the former settlement called Arbanaški, literally meaning Albanian, from which archaeological remains have been excavated.

== Demographics ==
According to the 2002 census, the village had a total of 109 inhabitants. Ethnic groups in the village include:

- Macedonians 108
- Serbs 1
