= Miklós Kovács (poet) =

- Born: November 24, 1857; Vas County, Kingdom of Hungary
- Died: November 23, 1937 (aged 79); Veliki Šalovci, Kingdom of Yugoslavia

Miklós Kovács (Prekmurje Slovene: Mikloš Kovač, Slovene: Nikolaj Kovač) (November 24, 1857 – November 23, 1937) was a Hungarian Slovene cantor and writer.

He was born in Šalovci (Prekmurje) in Vas County of the Kingdom of Hungary. His parents were Mihály Kováts and Rozália Kováts. Although he was primarily engaged in farming, he also wrote songs, mostly religious ones. His hymnal was lost over time, as was the hymnal of his collaborator József Konkolics. János Zsupánek preserved some of their songs.

Konkolics and Kovács subsidized the publication of Zsupánek's book Mrtvecsne peszmi (Dirges) in 1910.

He died in Veliki Šalovci in the Kingdom of Yugoslavia.

== See also ==
- List of Slovene writers and poets in Hungary
- Mihály Zsupánek
