= Dolenci, Demir Hisar =

Dolenci Доленци
- Village
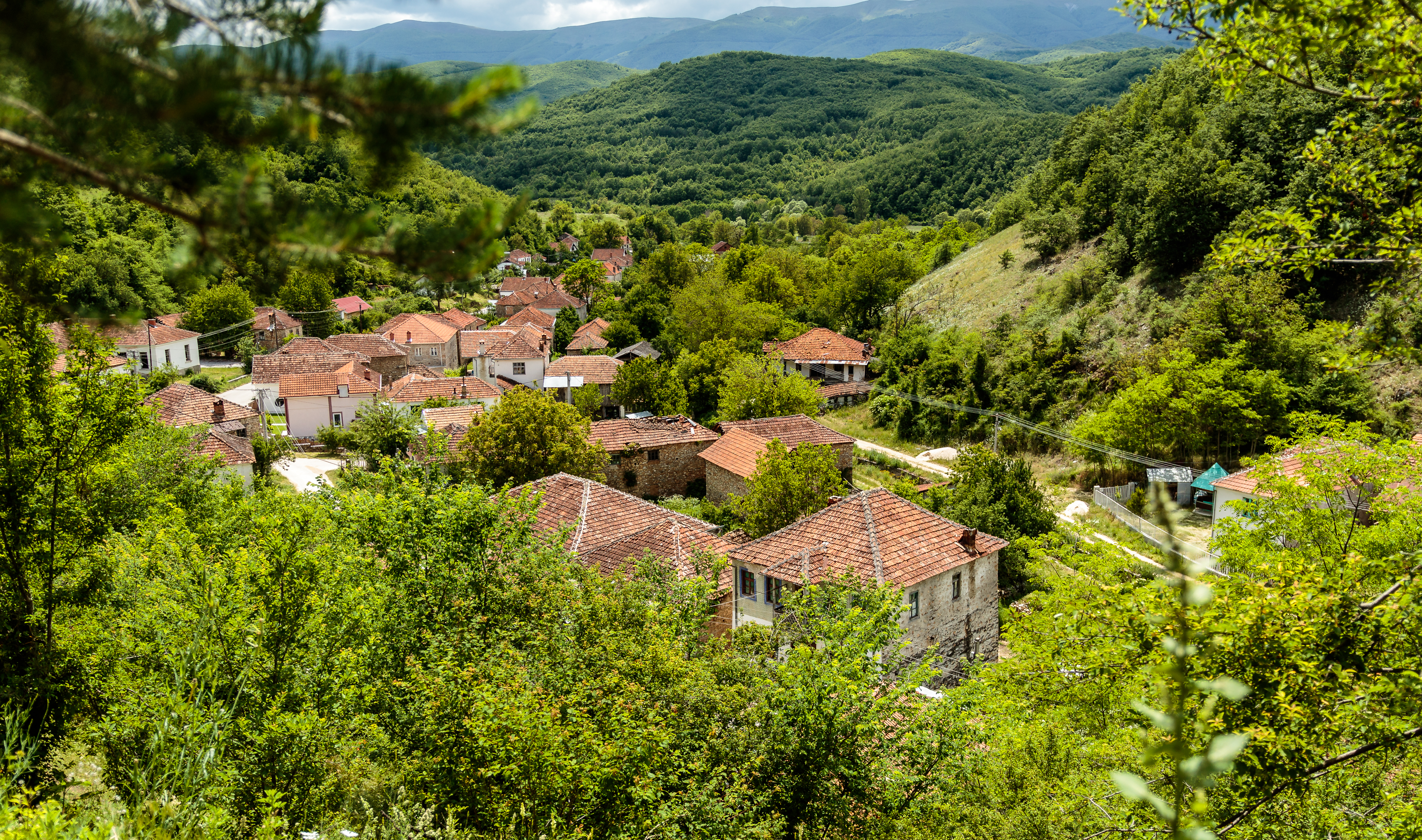

- Location within North Macedonia
- Coordinates: 41.315556°N 21.097778°E
- Country: North Macedonia
- Region: Pelagonia
- Municipality: Demir Hisar

Population (2002)
  - Total: 97
- Time zone: UTC+1 (CET)
  - Summer (DST): UTC+2 (CEST)
- Website: .

Dolenci (Macedonian: Доленци) is a village in the municipality of Demir Hisar, North Macedonia.

== Name ==
Dolenci is also the name of a village in Prekmurje, a village in Gorski Kotar, several other villages near Ohrid and Prespa (Dolenci, Bitola, Bigor Dolenci, Manastirsko Dolenci), a hamlet of Donji Stupnik, a hamlet of Lupoglav, and a hamlet of nearby Završje.

== Demographics ==
In the 1467/1468 Ottoman defter, the village had 35 households. A majority of household heads bore Slavic names, while a fifth bore Albanian ones.

In statistics gathered by Vasil Kanchov in 1900, the village of Dolenci was inhabited by 330 Christian Bulgarians.

According to the 2002 census, the village had a total of 97 inhabitants. all of them being Macedonians
