= Dolenci, Croatia =

Dolenci Grišniki
- Village
- Interactive map of Dolenci
- Location within Croatia
- Coordinates: 45.423968°N 15.125206°E
- Country: Croatia
- County: Primorje-Gorski Kotar County
- City: Vrbovsko
- Community: Lukovdol

Area
  - Total: 0.3 km^{2} (0.12 sq mi)
- Elevation: 309 m (1,014 ft)

Population (2021)
  - Total: 8
  - Density: 27/km^{2} (69/sq mi)
- Time zone: UTC+1 (CET)
  - Summer (DST): UTC+2 (CEST)
- Postal code: 51326
- Area code: +385 051

Dolenci is a village in Croatia, under the Vrbovsko township, in Primorje-Gorski Kotar County.

== Name ==
Its old name Grišniki is derived from the patronym Grišnik or Grišnjaković.

Dolenci is also the name of a village in Prekmurje, several villages near Ohrid and Prespa (Dolenci, Bitola, Dolenci, Demir Hisar, Bigor Dolenci, Manastirsko Dolenci), a hamlet of Donji Stupnik, a hamlet of Lupoglav, and a hamlet of nearby Završje.

== History ==
Although the village was not mentioned by name, a certain Stjepan Grišnjaković was listed on the Modruše urbarium of 1486 under Lukovdol, who owned 9 morgens of land, of which 4 were pasture, paying 84 solidi to Lord Bernardin Frankopan annually as with all others in Lukovdol.

Dolenci was hit by the 2014 Dinaric ice storm.

On 12 December 2020, a dog killed a lamb there, leading to a police investigation.

== Demographics ==
As of 2021, the only inhabitant under the age of 20 was a single teenage boy.

Village of Dolenci: Population trends 1857–2021
v

population	84	102	74	70	54	48	27	24	19	18	24	27	23	18	18	10	8
	1857	1869	1880	1890	1900	1910	1921	1931	1948	1953	1961	1971	1981	1991	2001	2011	2021

Note:Do 1900. iskazivano pod imenom Grišniki. U 2001. smanjeno za dio područja koji je pripojen naselju Vučnik, za koji sadrži dio podataka za navedeno razdoblje. Sources: Croatian Bureau of Statistics publications

In 1870, Grišniki, in Lukovdol's porezna općina, had 14 houses and 102 people.

In 1890, Grišniki (Dolenci) had 16 houses and 70 people. Its villagers were under Lukovdol parish, school and tax districts, but were administered by Severin.

=== Further reading ===
- Kraljevski zemaljski statistički ured (1903). Političko i sudbeno razdieljenje i Repertorij prebivališta Kraljevina Hrvatske i Slavonije po stanju od 1. travnja 1903. Zagreb: Kraljevska hrvatsko-slavonsko-dalmatinska zemaljska vlada, 🖶 Kraljevska zemaljska tiskara.
- Kraljevski zemaljski statistički ured (May 1913). "Repertorij prebivališta po županijama, upravnim kotarima, gradovima, upravnim i poreznim općinama". Političko i sudbeno razdjeljenje i Repertorij prebivališta Kraljevina Hrvatske i Slavonije po stanju od 1. siječnja 1913. Zagreb: Kraljevska hrvatsko-slavonsko-dalmatinska zemaljska vlada, 🖶 Kraljevska zemaljska tiskara. pp. 1–126. Page 33.

== Politics ==
As of its foundation on 3 March 2008, it belongs to the local committee of Lukovdol.

== Bibliography ==
=== History ===
- Martinković (1854-04-10) [written 1854-03-14]. "Poziv od strane ureda c. kr. podžupani karlovačke nižepodpisani vojnoj dužnosti podvèrženi momci". Carsko kraljevske službene narodne novine (in Serbo-Croatian). Vol. 20, no. 82. p. 217. ISSN 1333-5243.
- Podžupan (1859-07-27) [written 1859-06-14]. "Poziv". Carsko kraljevske službene narodne novine (in Serbo-Croatian). Vol. 20, no. 170. pp. 433–434. ISSN 1333-5243.
- Korenčić, Mirko (1979). Naselja i stanovništvo Socijalističke Republike Hrvatske (1857–1971) [Villages and Population of the Socialist Republic of Croatia (1857–1971)]. Djela Jugoslavenske akademije znanosti i umjetnosti (in Serbo-Croatian). Vol. 54.
- Lopašić, Radoslav (1894). "Urbar Modruški od g. 1486" [The Modruš Urbarium of the Year 1486]. Hrvatski urbari. Monumenta historico-iuridica Slavorum meridionalium (in Croatian). Vol. 5, 1. pp. 20–81.
  - Republished: Lopašić, Radoslav (1997). Abramović, Ignacije (ed.). Urbar modruški [The Modruš Urbarium] (in Croatian). Ogulin: Ogranak Matice hrvatske. ISBN 953-96393-4-4. Tirage: 500.
