= Good Shepherd Lutheran Church (Moravske Toplice) =

Lutheran church in Slovenia

- Slovene: Evangeličanska cerkev Dobrega pastirja Jezusa
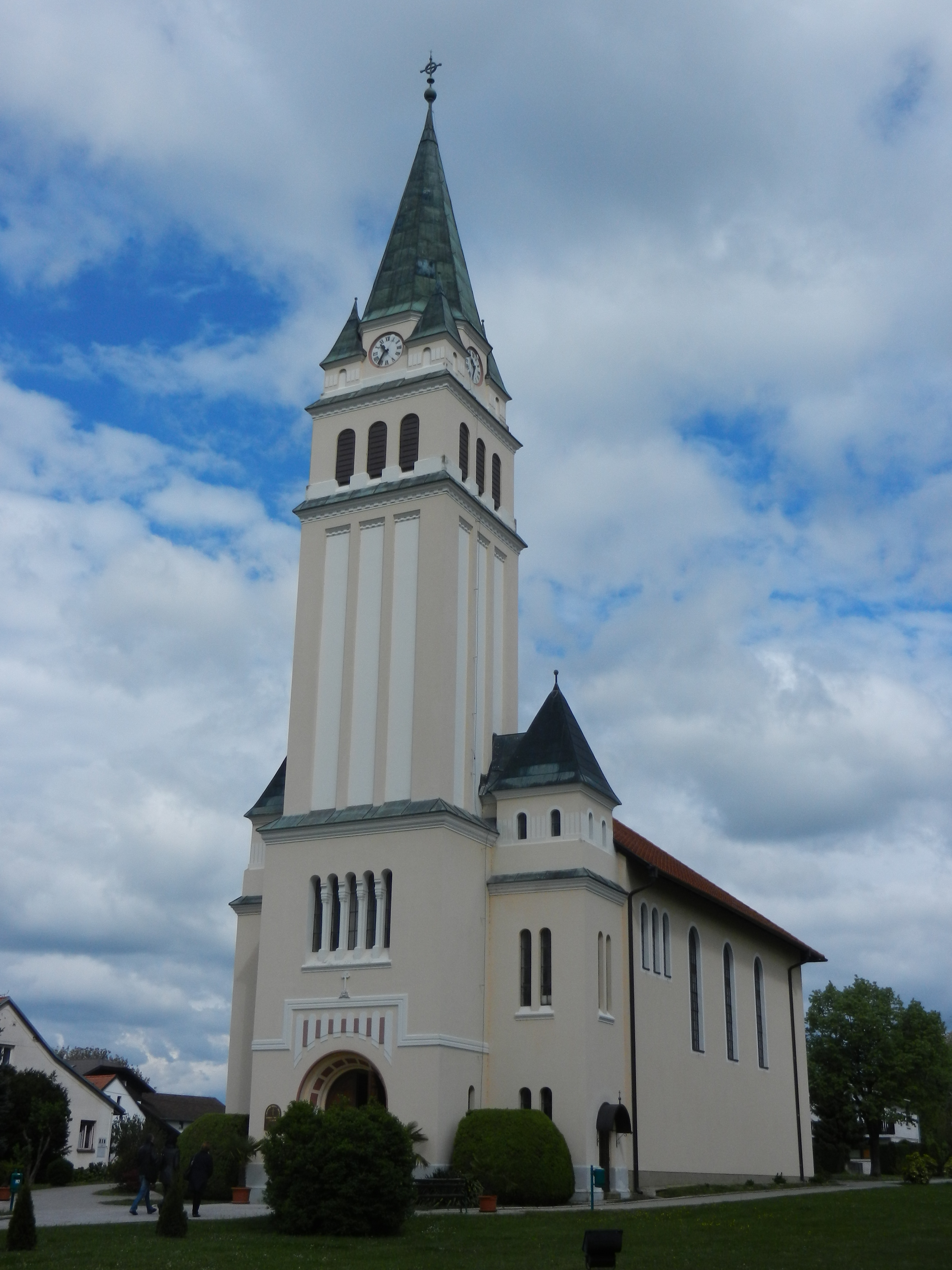
- Exterior of the church

- 46°41′07″N 16°13′05″E
- Location: Moravske Toplice
- Address: Levstikova ulica 11
- Country: Slovenia
- Denomination: Lutheranism
- Website: evang.si/obcine/

History
- Status: active
- Founded: 1893
- Dedication: Good Shepherd
- Consecrated: 1962

Architecture
- Heritage designation: monument of local importance
- Designated: 2014
- Architect(s): Ödön Hochholzer, Jamšek
- Architectural type: single-nave parish church
- Style: Neo-Romanesque, mid-century modern
- Years built: 1924-1925, 1960-62
- Completed: 1962

Specifications
- Materials: brick, concrete

Administration
- Division: Evangelical Church of the Augsburg Confession in Slovenia
- Parish: Moravske Toplice

Clergy
- Pastor: Primož Kumin

Good Shepherd Lutheran Church (Slovene: Evangeličanska cerkev Dobrega pastirja Jezusa) is a Lutheran church in Moravske Toplice, a thermal resort in the Prekmurje region of Slovenia. It belongs to the local church congregation of the Evangelical Church of the Augsburg Confession in Slovenia. The Neo-Romanesque tower was built in 1925, and the mid-century modern nave was added between 1960 and 1962. The church is the most conspicuous landmark in the center of the village, and the only listed building in Moravske Toplice. It stands right next to regional road no. 442, called Kranjčeva ulica; the surrounding green area is called the Prekmurje Reformation Park.

== History ==
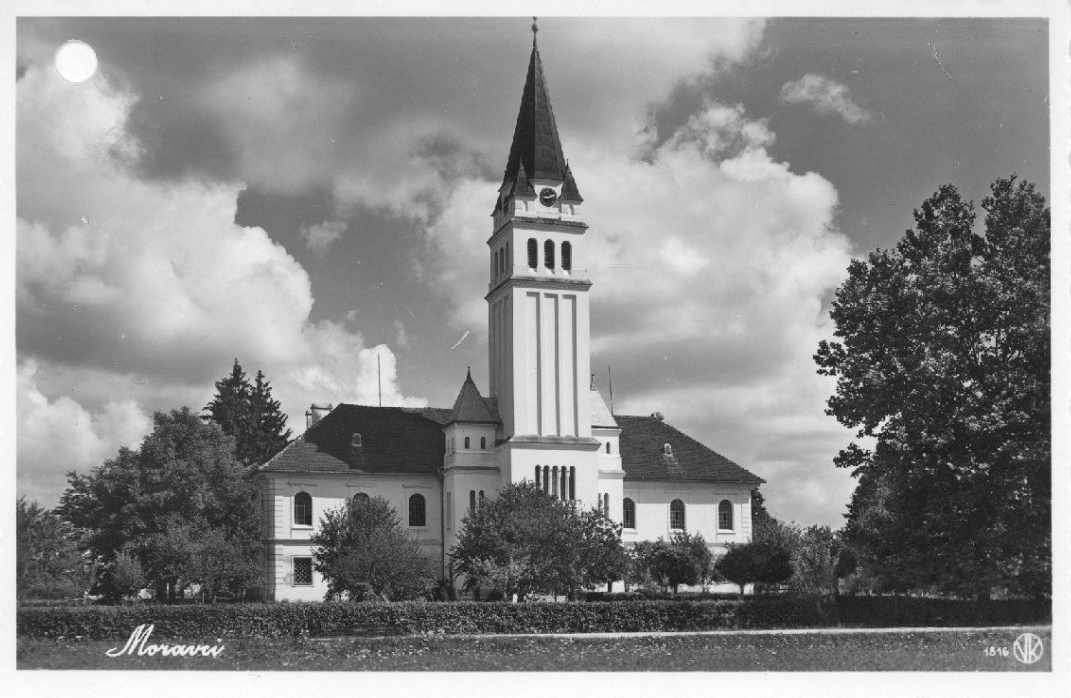
The church in the interwar period with the Neo-Romanesque tower and the old manor house behind (postcard by Vekoslav Kramarič)

Tót-Morácz (now Moravske Toplice) was a predominantly Lutheran village since the second half of the 16th century. The record of a canonical visitation conducted by Lutheran ecclesiastical officials in the area in 1627 listed the settlement among the villages that belonged to the Lutheran parish of Martyáncz (now Martjanci). After the 1781 Patent of Toleration religious freedom was granted to the Lutherans, and Tót-Morácz became the daughter congregation of the Lutheran parish of Puczincz (now Puconci). There was no church in the village until the end of the 19th century but a Lutheran school was established in 1855.

The Lutherans of Tót-Morácz initiated the establishment of an independent congregation in 1887, but they also asked for support from neighboring villages. The Lutherans of Mezővár (now Tešanovci) and Zsidahegy (now Vučja Gomila) joined the initiative, and on October 11, 1888, the Lutheran believers of the three villages decided at a joint meeting to purchase the former Batthyány manor house in Tót-Morácz from its last private owner, József Ernuszt and his father, Kelemen Ernuszt.

The Late Baroque manor house was acquired for 15,000 forints on 2 November 1888, along with 34 acres of arable land and meadows. The price was favorable, and it had to be paid in installments over 10 years. The constituting meeting of the congregation was held on 1 November 1889, and István Kühár from Mezővár was elected as senior warden.

In 1893 the manor house was converted into a church, school and rectory complex: the prayer hall was located upstairs, and the classroom, as well as the pastor's and teacher's apartments, were on the ground floor. An organ, made by József Angster from Pécs, pulpit altar, benches and other interior furnishings were purchased. The church was inaugurated on 17 December 17 1893. On 17 September 1893, Sándor (Aleksander) Hima was elected as assistant pastor. At the time, the congregation was still subordinate to Puczincz.

An independent Lutheran parish was established in 1899, with Mezővár and Zsidahegy as daughter congregations. Bishop Ferenc Gyurátz visited the congregation the following year. Hima served as leader of the community until his death in 1936.

The prayer hall on the first floor of the manor house was a simple, unadorned room with a flat ceiling. The hall was capable of accommodating 500 people and it had a small gallery. The congregation's improving financial situation made it possible to begin preparing for the construction of a proper church. The plans were commissioned in 1913 from Ödön Hochholzer, an architect from Szombathely. In 1914, the congregation approved the plans for a Neo-Romanesque church, the construction of which would have cost 96,000 crowns.

Due to the outbreak of World War I, this plan could not be realized because the congregation invested 45,000 crowns of its capital in a war loan; the bells were also sacrificed. By 1924, enough money was gathered to build at least the bell tower based on Hochholzer's plans; construction drawings were prepared by Janez Mayer, a master builder from Murska Sobota. The bell tower was inaugurated on September 6, 1925. Three years later, two bells and a clock were installed in the tower. After Hima, his former assistant pastor, Franc (Ferenc) Kühár served as pastor from 1937 until 1940, then István Balogh succeeded him in 1941, but he had to emigrate to Hungary after the end of World War II. He was followed by Aleksander Skalič from Selo between 1946 and 1973.

After the war, the buildings were partially renovated and electrified, but the old manor house was in poor condition. It was demolished in the 1950s, and the construction of the nave began in 1960. The plans were drawn by architect Jamšek from Ljubljana, and the construction work was done by the members of the congregation. The new church was dedicated on 2 July 1962. A new rectory was also constructed in 1958. The church was completely renovated in 2004. In 2014, it was decreed a monument of local importance.

Geza Erniša, who served as priest from 1997 until his death in 2022, was the first Lutheran bishop of Slovenia and a respected figure of Protestant ecumenism, especially in the Gustav-Adolf-Werk and the Lutheran World Federation.

== Architecture ==
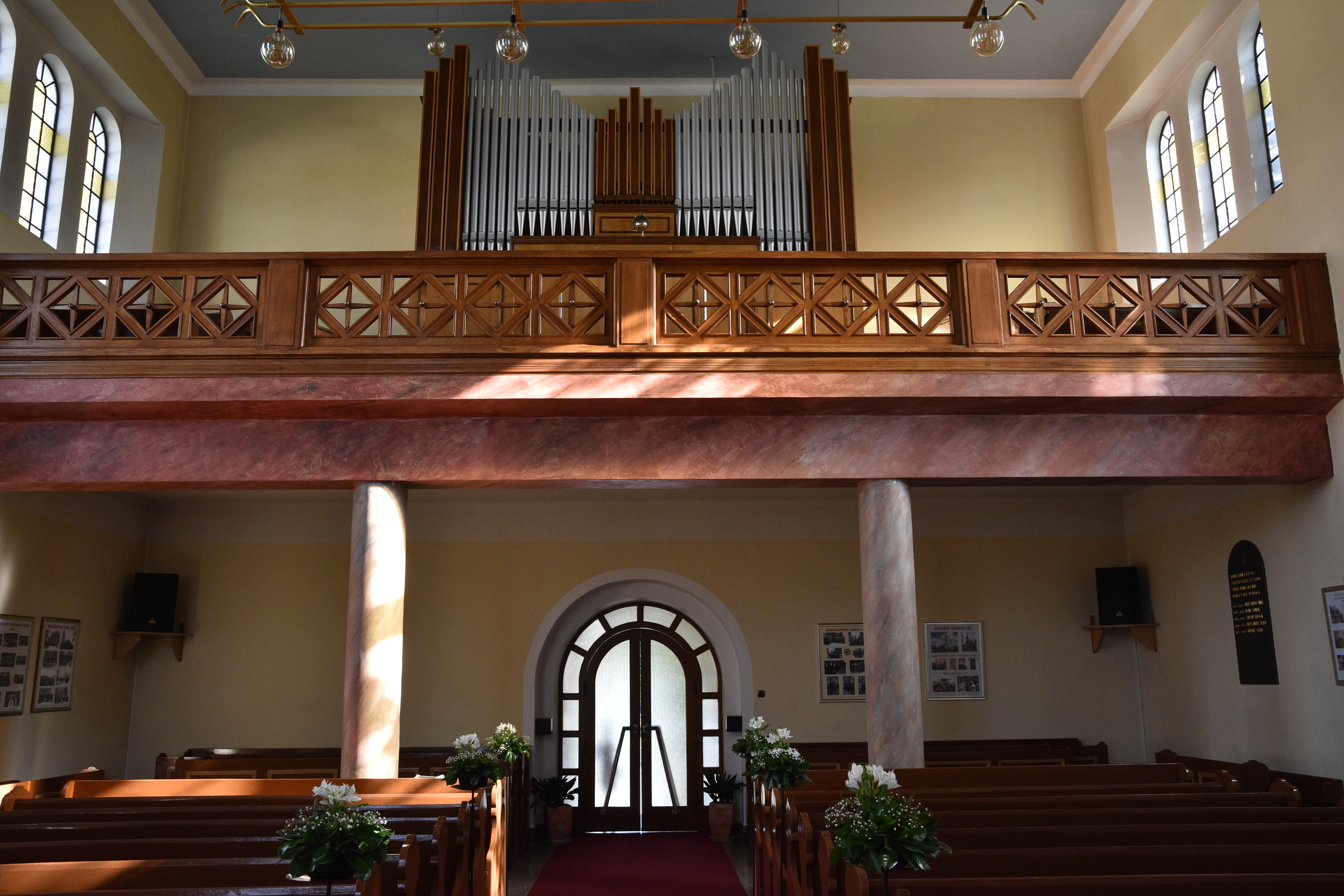
The organ loft with the modern organ

Although the church was constructed in two phases, it successfully blends the traditional elements of early 20th century ecclesiastical architecture with the simplified, modern clarity of the mid-twentieth century. The overall silhouette is defined by the tall, dominant bell tower that was built in 1925. The central tower is connected to two lower stair towers on each side, which allow access to the gallery. The tower rises in a series of clearly articulated vertical sections, beginning with a broad, rectangular shaft accentuated by long, narrow vertical recesses that emphasize height. Near the top, the tower transitions into a clock stage with four clock faces, crowned by a pointed, copper-clad spire. Smaller, steeply pitched turret roofs flank the lower part of the tower, adding visual balance and giving the façade a more complex, sculptural outline. The main entrance is set within a gently arched portal surrounded by subtle ornamental detailing. Above the entrance, a grouping of narrow arched windows reinforces the building’s verticality.

Along the modern nave, tall, evenly spaced arched windows provide rhythm and illumination.

The spacious and bright interior is illuminated by tall, slender arched windows that allow abundant natural light to enter. To the right of the altar is a huge floor-to-ceiling window whose divider forms a cross. At the rear of the nave stands a wooden organ loft with a finely crafted balustrade displaying geometric, lattice-like motifs. The wall behind the altar has a wallpaper-like painted surface with the symbol of the Luther rose and an inscription: Bodi veren, do smrti – 'Be faithful, until death'. On the left wall there is a line from Psalm 23:1: Gospod je moj pastir, nič mi ne manjka. Na zelenih pašnikih mi daje ležišče – 'The Lord is my shepherd, I lack nothing. He makes me lie down in green pastures'. The walls are finished in light tones, occasionally accented with subtle painted niches or decorative surfaces that complement the warm natural wood of the pews and the gallery. Overall, the interior combines modest ornamentation with clear lines and harmonious proportions, creating a serene, welcoming atmosphere.

A new altar and a separate pulpit were built in the 21st century; only the original altarpiece was kept, an 1893 oleograph depicting Jesus in the Garden. According to the Hungarian inscription on the edge of the basin, the marble baptismal font was donated to the church by István Kühár and his wife from Mezővár in 1893.

== Gallery ==
Interior of Good Shepherd Lutheran Church
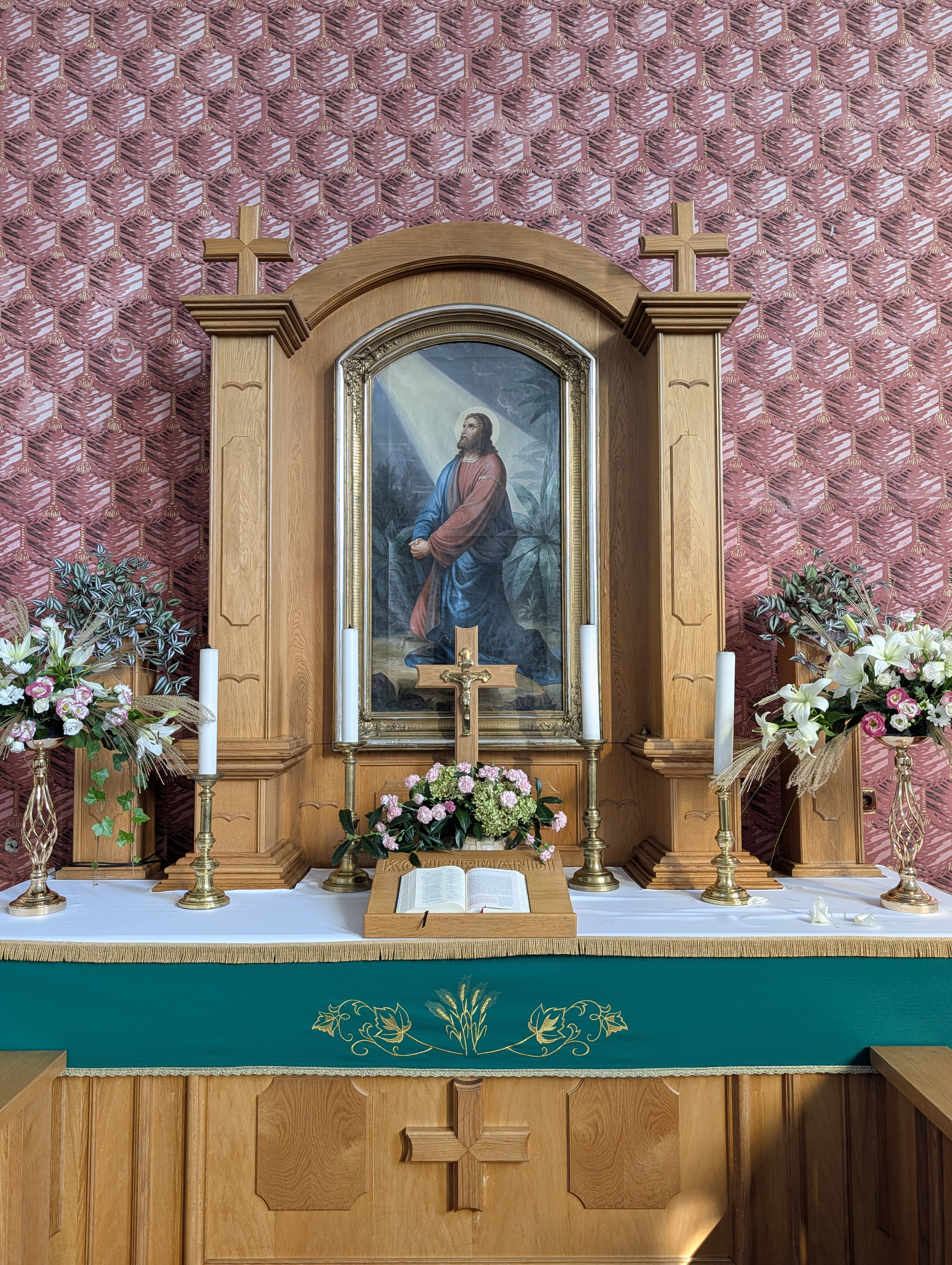
The modern altar with the original altarpiece

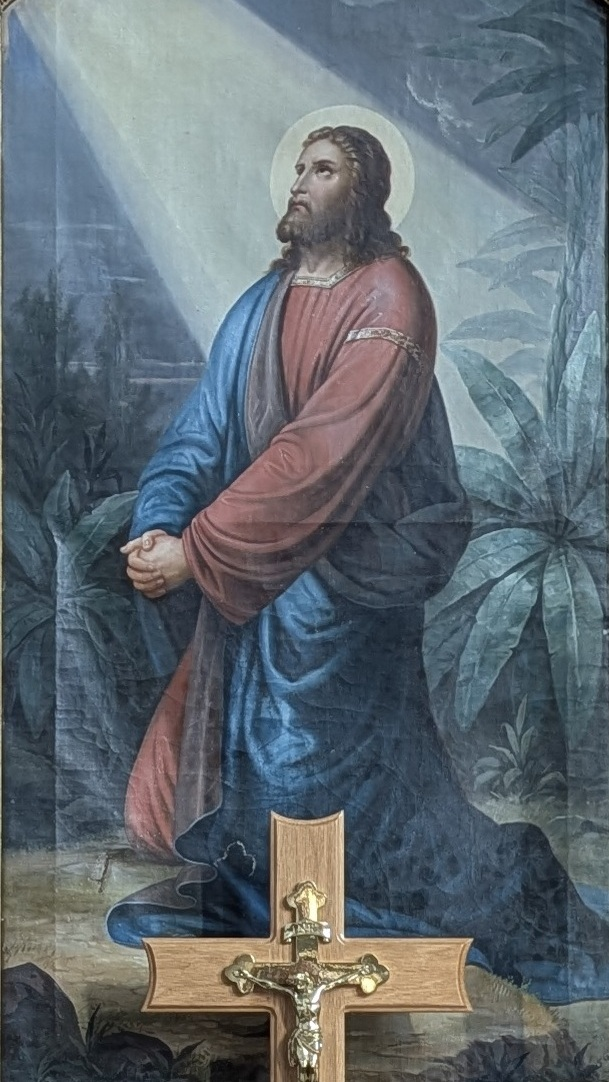
Jesus in the Garden (oleograph from 1893)

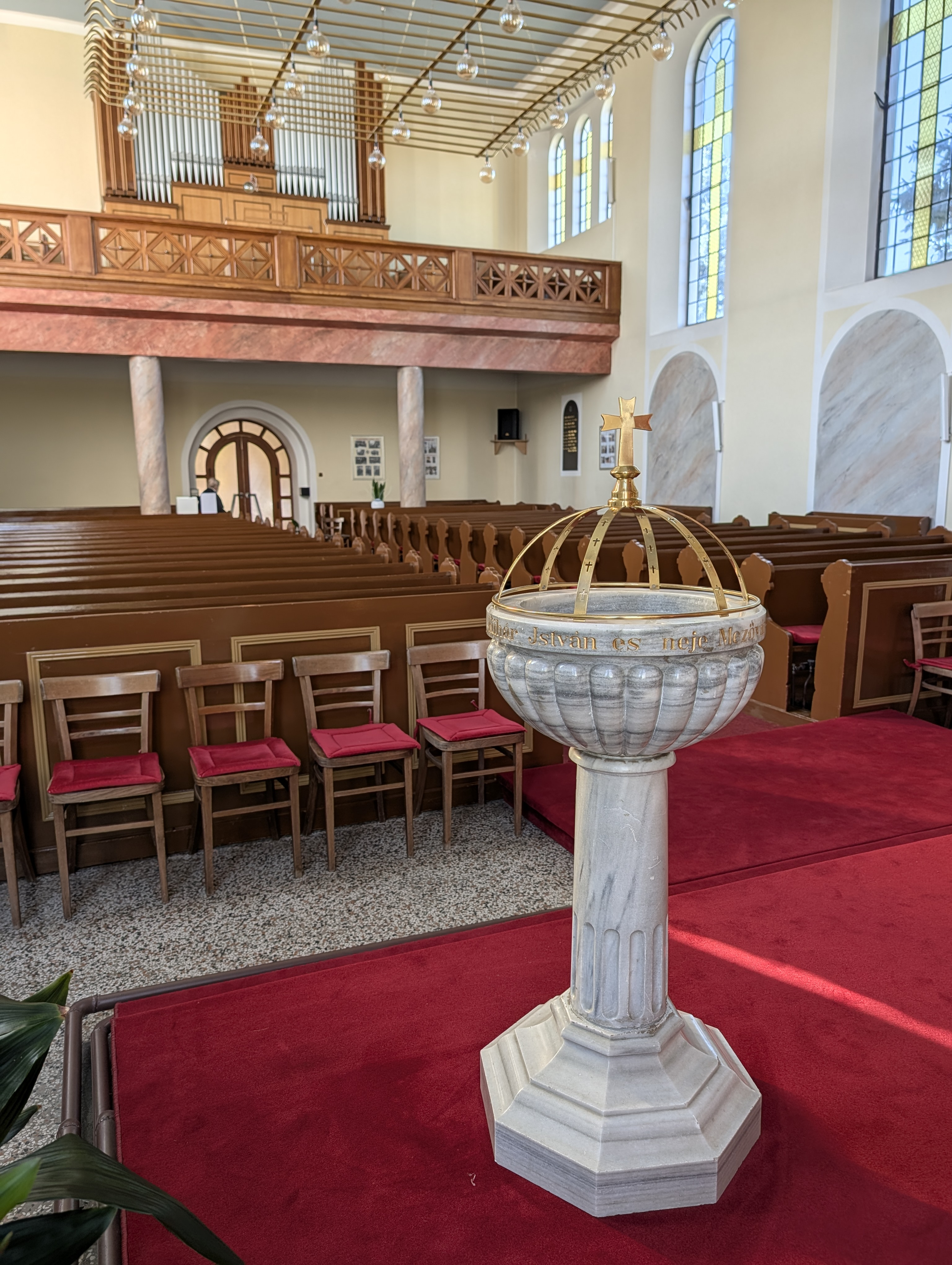
Marble baptismal font from 1893

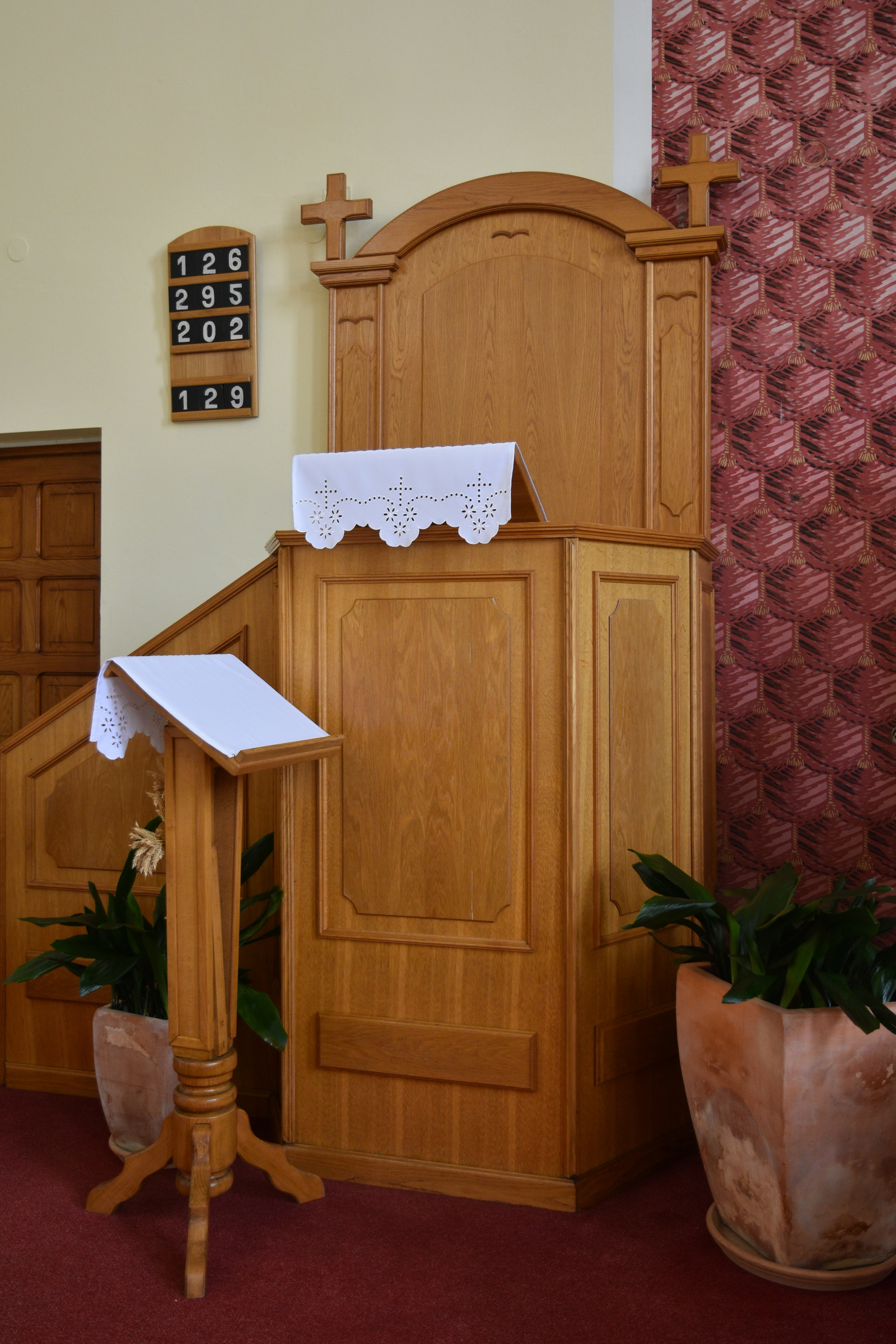
Modern pulpit right next to the altar
Example 1
