= József Klekl =

Jozef Klekl or Jozsef Klekl may refer to:

- József Klekl (politician) (1874–1948), (Prekmurje) Slovene writer, politician, and Catholic priest
- József Klekl (writer) (1879–1936), (Prekmurje) Slovene writer, journalist, and Catholic priest
