= Krajna, Tišina =

Krajna
- Location in Slovenia
- Coordinates: 46°41′12.35″N 16°3′4.53″E
- Country: Slovenia
- Traditional region: Prekmurje
- Statistical region: Mura
- Municipality: Tišina

Area
  - Total: 4.93 km^{2} (1.90 sq mi)
- Elevation: 203 m (666 ft)

Population (2002)
  - Total: 299

Krajna (pronounced [ˈkɾaːi̯na]; Hungarian: Véghely) is a roadside settlement in the Municipality of Tišina in the Prekmurje region of northeastern Slovenia.

Ferenc Temlin, writer of the first Prekmurje dialect book, the writer Mátyás Temlin, the Slovene politician in Hungary József Klekl and his cousin the writer József Klekl were all born in Krajna.
