= Moravske Toplice =

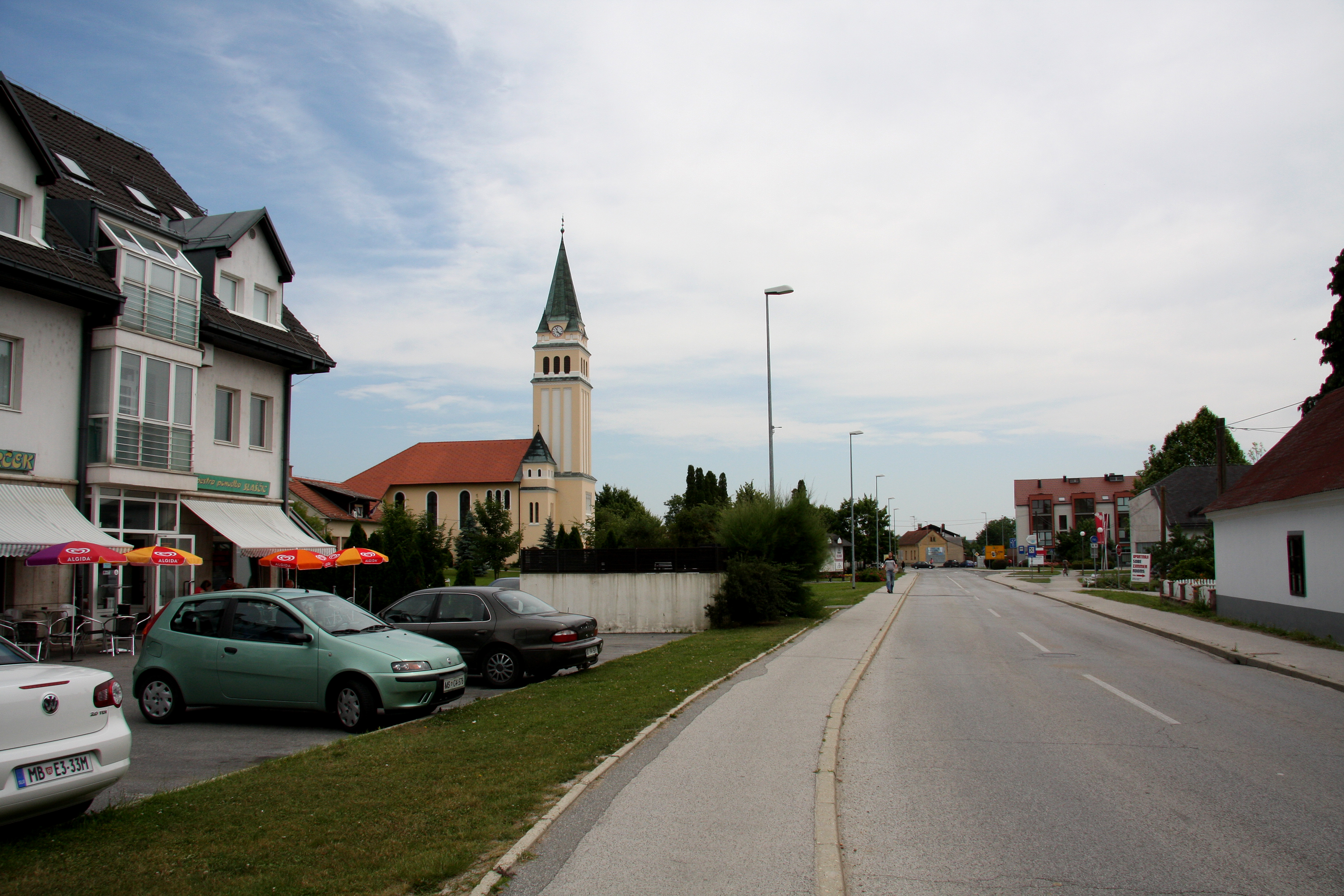
- Moravske Toplice

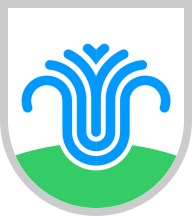
- Coat of arms

- Location in Slovenia
- Coordinates: 46°41′33.85″N 16°13′41.33″E
- Country: Slovenia
- Traditional region: Prekmurje
- Statistical region: Mura
- Municipality: Moravske Toplice

Area
  - Total: 8.6 km^{2} (3.3 sq mi)
- Elevation: 203.4 m (667 ft)

Population (2024)
  - Total: 914
  - Density: 106/km^{2} (270/sq mi)
- Postal code: 9226
- Website: www.moravske-toplice.si

Moravske Toplice (pronounced [mɔˈɾaːu̯skɛ tɔˈpliːtsɛ]) is a settlement in the Municipality of Moravske Toplice in the Prekmurje region of Slovenia. It is the seat of the municipality and is best known for its thermal spa.

== Name ==
The name of the settlement was changed from Moravci to Moravske Toplice (lit. 'Moravci Hot Springs') in 1983 to reflect its new character as a spa town. The earliest written form of the name (Moravc in 1366) is of Slavic origin and means 'marshy place'. This probably reflected the natural conditions of the area in the Middle Ages. The Hungarian name was derived from the Slovenian; it was recorded as Maracz in 1499. The 19th-century version was Tót-Morácz (lit. 'Slovene Morácz'), which was officially changed to Alsómarác (lit. 'Lower Marác') in 1907 to distinguish it from Felsőmarác (lit. 'Upper Marác').

== History ==
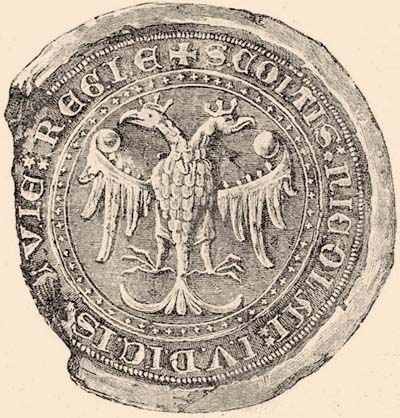
The coat of arms of Miklós Széchy

The first written mention of the settlement dates back to 1366. In 1365, Miklós Széchy, the Ban of Croatia, and his brother, Domonkos, the Bishop of Transylvania, received Lendva Castle and its appurtenances in exchange for Éleskő castle and its appurtenances as royal grant from King Louis I of Hungary. When the brothers were invested with their lands a year later, the estate was described in great detail, and two villages were listed as Morauch et alia Morauch in districtu Sancti Martini. The wording suggests that there were two villages right next to each other and both were called Moravc ("Moravc and the other Moravc"). The royal deed of donation (1365) lists a few villages with Hungarian names in the same area, two of which (Dewecherhaza and Pezkfolua) can be tentatively identified with the two Moravces. Administratively, the village was part of Vas County in the Kingdom of Hungary from the earliest record of its existence.

Like many other small settlements in the area, Moravc did not have its own church; from an ecclesiastical point of view, it belonged to the parish of Sancti Martini (now Martjanci). The village was owned by the Széchy family until the extinction of their Felső-Lendva branch in 1570. Through their female descendants, the estate passed to the Batthyány family in 1640. It remained in their possession for nearly 250 years.

In the second half of the 16th century, the owners of the feudal estate became Lutherans, and the Slovenian villages in the southwestern part of Vas County converted to the Lutheran faith. The record of a canonical visitation conducted by Lutheran ecclesiastical officials in the area in 1627 listed Marácz among the villages that belonged to the Lutheran parish of Martyáncz. Although the Batthyány family, the local feudal lords, returned to the Catholic faith in the 1630s, Marácz remained a predominantly Lutheran village.

After Kanizsa fell into Ottoman hands in 1600, the area along the Mura River also became a border region, and in the following century it was exposed to Turkish raids and taxation. Although Marácz's name is not mentioned in the sources, it certainly shared the fate of the neighboring villages, and its inhabitants were probably often forced to flee. A more peaceful era began after 1690, when the Turks were finally expelled.

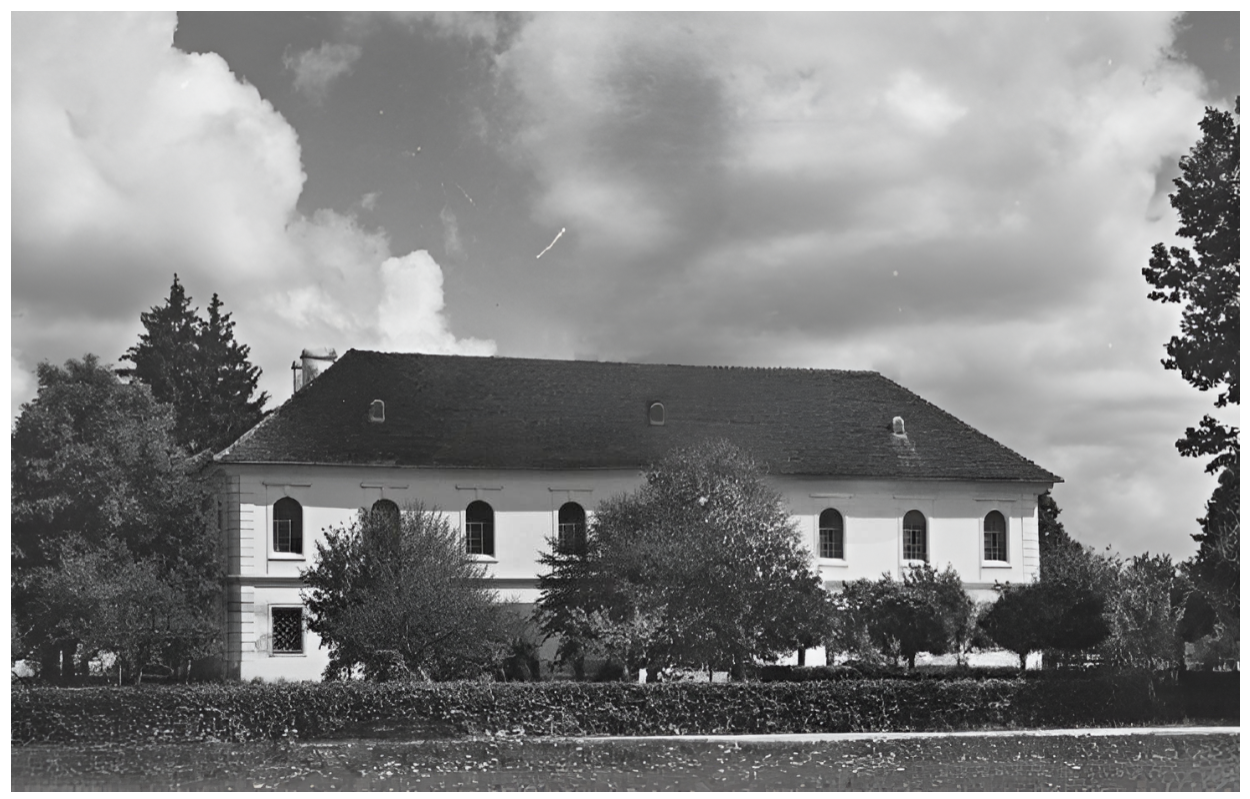
Digital reconstruction of the Batthyány (later Ernuszt) Mansion

After the 1781 Patent of Toleration religious freedom was granted to the Lutherans, and Tót-Morácz became the daughter congregation of the Lutheran parish of Puczincz (now Puconci). During the first Hungarian census in 1785, there were 262 people living in 42 houses in the village, almost all of them peasants. The lords of the village were the Counts Szapáry and Count Miksa Batthyány.

The manor house of the Batthyány family stood right by the highway leading towards Mura-Szombat. The late Baroque house was surrounded by a garden with a few outbuildings. The estate was inherited by Count Lajos Batthyány as a child from his father, Count József Sándor Batthyány, in 1812, but it was managed by his mother, Borbála Skerlecz, until an agreement was reached between them in 1830. Lajos Batthyány, who became the first prime minister of Hungary, owned the estate until his execution in 1849. Then the estate was confiscated on grounds of treason, and it was redeemed by his wife's brother, Count János Zichy. In the early 1860s, it was purchased by the Ernuszt family, who later sold the land piece by piece. The estate was finally liquidated in 1888.

In 1855, a Lutheran school was established. In 1871, the school had 40 students, and the local congregation numbered 271 people.

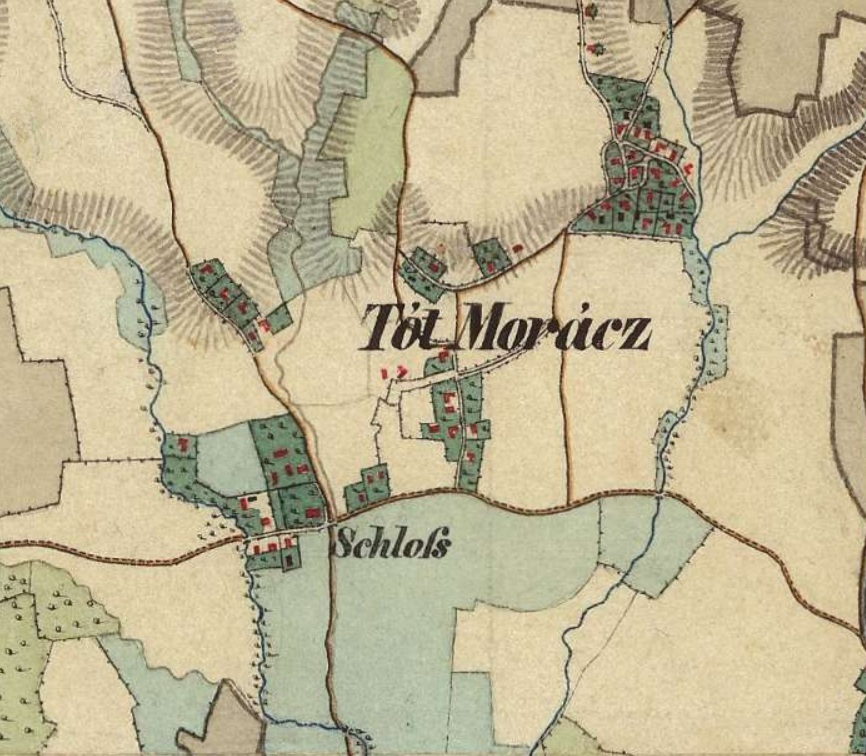
The village on the Second Military Mapping Survey

The cadastral survey conducted at the end of the feudal era, in 1860, listed 68 houses in Tót-Morácz. The houses were scattered over a large area, standing alone or in small, irregular clusters. Almost all buildings were made of wood. There was an inn that was owned by the Zichy estate, opposite the manor. The village had a small cemetery (on the site of today's volunteer fire department). The surnames show that the majority of the inhabitants were Slovenes, but Hungarian names also occurred. Arable land and forests were the two dominant categories in land use, but the proportion of meadows was also significant, indicating the importance of animal husbandry.

The cadastral map recorded numerous microtoponyms used in the village at the time, only a few of which remain in use today. Microtoponyms in the lowland area include Lipnicze (the present thermal spa), Za skedny (the present village centre), Skaliny, Mocsvár, Dugi breg, Trebesaj, Upecske, Borovje, Gaj, and Brzinscsek. Locations in the Goričko area include Goustya, Baloghegy (now Rumičev Breg), Czuber, Alsó-Mihalovcsin (now Vinska Graba), and Felső-Mihalovcsin (now Moravske Gorice).

The local toponymy was almost entirely Slovenian; the only Hungarian name was Baloghegy. Several names referred to vegetation and woodland, other names described terrain and landscape features. For example, Borovje derives from the Slavic word *borъ 'pine', indicating a pine forest, and Gaj denotes a small grove. The name Goustya, for a still existing large forest, probably derives from Slovene gošča 'dense woodland'. Skaliny most likely refers to stony ground (from Slovene skala 'rock'), and Dugi breg literally means 'long slope'. The name Brzinscsek probably relates to a small fast-flowing stream or gully (cf. Slavic *bъrzъ 'fast'), and Mocsvár most likely derives from Slavic *močьva 'marsh'. Za skedny 'behind the barns' was an area located behind farm buildings, and Trebesaj probably derives from the Slovene verb trebiti 'to clear forest', suggesting land created by woodland clearance. A few names were connected to personal names.

The slow material growth of the village is shown by the fact that at the time of the 1910 census, 109 of the 151 houses were still built of wood, while 89 houses already had tiled roofs. Eighty-seven percent of the population over age six could read and write. A volunteer fire brigade was established in 1894.

In 1919, the entire Prekmurje region was united with the Kingdom of Serbs, Croats, and Slovenes; the border change was formalized in the Treaty of Trianon the following year. When the District of Murska Sobota was established in 1921, Moravci became a local community in the newly formed Municipality of Tešanovci. After annexation to Vas County and Hungary for a short period between 1941 and 1945, it became part of the Socialist Federal Republic of Yugoslavia following World War II, then independent Slovenia in 1991.

Administratively, it remained part of larger municipalities until 1994, when the new Municipality of Moravske Toplice was formed, of which it became the seat. The municipality contains 28 local communities.

== Geography ==
Moravske Toplice is located in the Prekmurje region of Slovenia, on the border of two different landscape units, the hilly region known as Goričko (lit. 'the uplands') and the flatlands known as Ravensko (lit. 'the flatlands'). The center of the village is located on both sides of regional road no. 442, on a flat area (about 190 m above sea level). The terrain rises to the north, reaching the foothills of Goričko. The highest point in the territory of the settlement is Kamena gorica (lit. 'stony hill', 317 m). A low, sloping range between the valleys of Lipnica and Mostec creeks reaches its highest elevation at Rdeči breg (lit. 'red hill', 277 m). Several streams run south from the hills and merge on the southern edge of Moravske Toplice; the most important is the Lipnica, which is fed by Mostec and Ribnjek creeks and is a tributary of the Ledava River.

== Demographics ==
The demographic evolution of Moravske Toplice has been documented through modern population censuses conducted regularly since 1881, first by the Hungarian state and later by the Yugoslav and Slovenian authorities.

After a period of growth in the last decades of the 19th century, the population declined after 1900, mainly due to outward migration, reaching its historical low point in 1971. Strong population growth in the last third of the 20th century can be attributed to the changes that followed the discovery of thermal water. Moravske Toplice's development diverged from that of the surrounding rural settlements, and the village gradually evolved into a thermal resort. Due to new job opportunities in the service sector and better living standards, migration attractiveness has increased. These trends continued into the first decades of the 21st century.

Historical population
Year	1881	1891	1900	1910	1921	1931	1941	1948	1953	1961	1971	1981	1991	2002	2011	2021
Pop.	692	710	758	725	696	646	568	617	597	546	541	622	666	719	735	860
±%	—	+2.6%	+6.8%	−4.4%	−4.0%	−7.2%	−12.1%	+8.6%	−3.2%	−8.5%	−0.9%	+15.0%	+7.1%	+8.0%	+2.2%	+17.0%
Source: Hungaricana SURS

The village was populated by Slovenians throughout its history, but the first census in 1881 also showed a small Hungarian presence (82 people, 12 percent of the population). In later censuses, the village remained almost exclusively Slovenian, but the proportion of those who could speak Hungarian was growing (30% in 1900, 44% in 1910). This peaked in 1941, when 55 percent of the population was able to speak Hungarian. Bilingualism disappeared in the decades following World War II. The proportion of Lutherans was 74 percent in 1882, the rest of the population was Catholic. In the following decades, the proportion of Lutherans was even higher, but in 1941 it stood again at 74 percent.

== Spatial structure ==
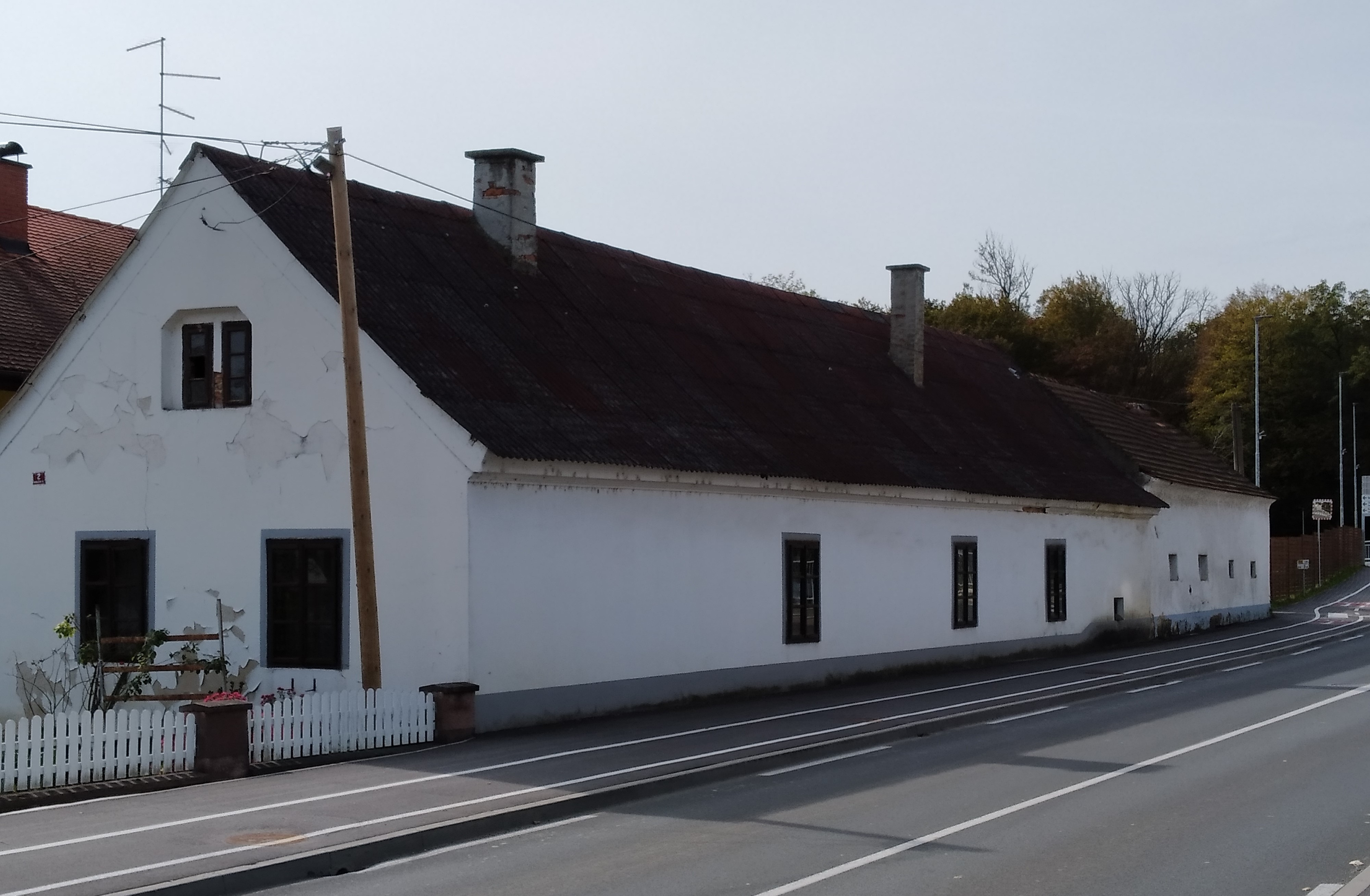
Old house in the center of the village

The spatial structure of the settlement was shaped by historical and geographical conditions. Until the 1970s, Moravci was a small village along the highway leading to Murska Sobota (today's Kranjčeva ulica) and a side road toward Fokovci (today's Dolga ulica). It also included scattered hamlets among the Goričko foothills. The nucleus of the present village center was established around the feudal manor in the 18th century on both sides of the highway. There was rapid growth in the second half of the 20th century, after the discovery of thermal water made Moravske Toplice one of the most important resorts in Slovenia. Hotels, guesthouses, and services were established around the thermal spa, and the center took on an urban character. The more remote parts, on the other hand, have retained their rural character even in the 21st century.

The lower part of Moravske Toplice is called Spodnji Moravci, and it consists of the village center and the thermal resort complex, Dolga ulica (lit. 'long street') and Lešče, along the road leading toward Fokovci, and Na Bregu (lit. 'on the hill'), a cluster of houses along a side street.

The hilly upper part of the village, called Zgornji Moravci, is separated from the lower part by extensive agricultural areas and forests. It is made up of several scattered hamlets among the Goričko foothills: Brezje, Brzinšček, Rumičev Breg, Cuber, Vinska Graba, and Moravske Gorice.

== Spas ==
There are two spas located in Moravske Toplice. Terme 3000 is the larger one and contains three hotels, a campsite, the Prekmurska Vas kitchenette suites, and an array of bungalows with traditional thatched roofs. All of them have access to 5,000 square metres (54,000 sq ft) of water areas: indoor and outdoor pools with a number of water slides. The outdoor pools are better suited for families with children, and the indoor ones for those who prefer a more peaceful environment. Large grassy areas surround the pools and offer natural shade.

The smaller one is Terme Vivat spa. The Vivat unit is only 50 m (160 ft) from the Vivat Hotel. The Vivat Hotel is fully adapted for persons with disabilities, and it is the first hotel in Slovenia designed for people with hearing impairments.

== Sights ==
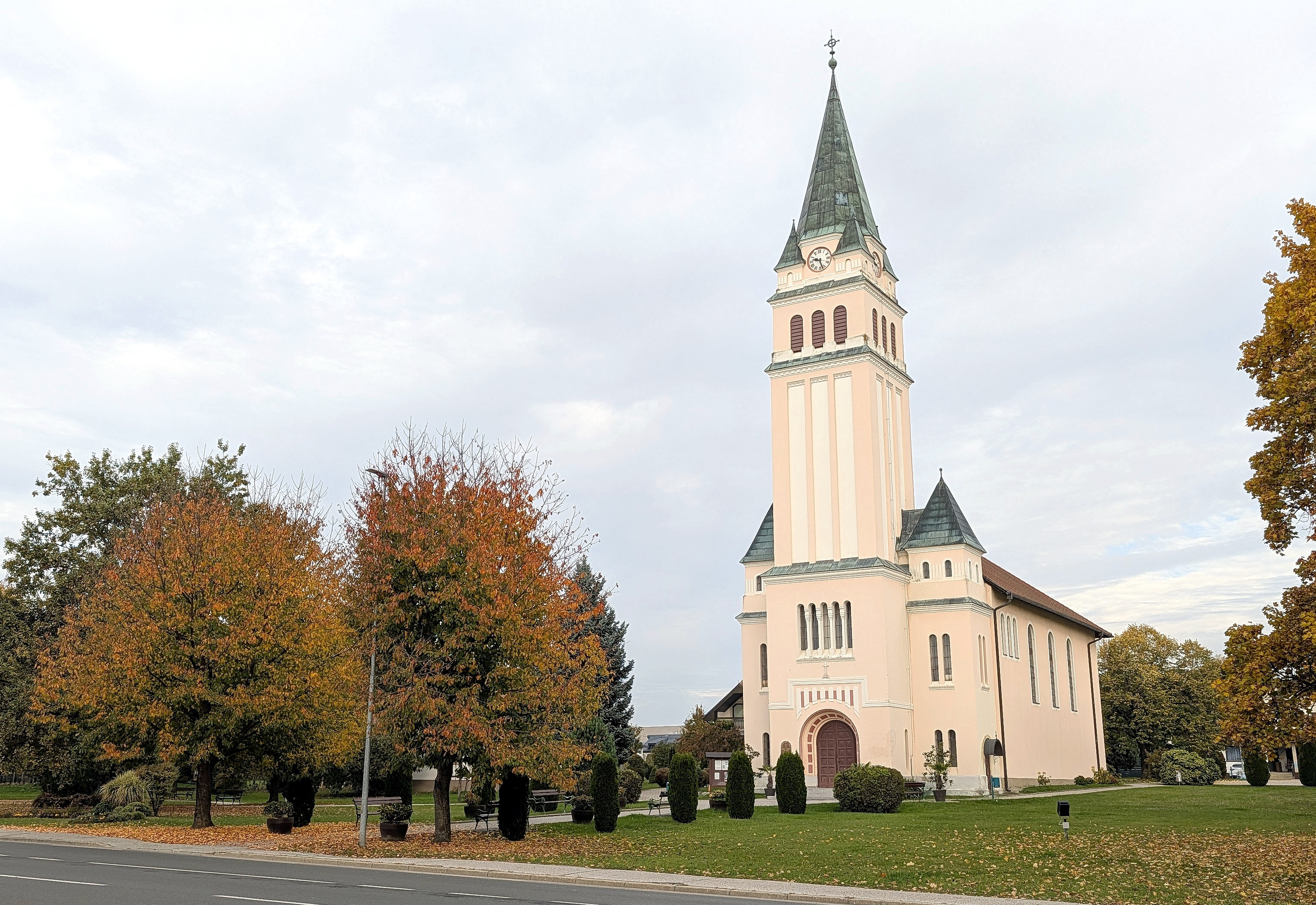
Good Shepherd Lutheran Church in the village's center

The only significant historical landmark in Moravske Toplice is Good Shepherd Lutheran Church, which stands at the site of the former Batthyány manor house. This was purchased from its last private owners, the Ernuszt family, for 15,000 forints by the Lutheran citizens of Tót-Morácz, Mezővár (now Tešanovci) and Zsidahegy (now Vučja Gomila) on 2 November 1888. The building was converted into a church, rectory and school complex, and an independent Lutheran parish was established in 1899.

In 1913, the construction of a new church was planned, but due to the interruption of the First World War, only a Neo-Romanesque bell tower was built next to the existing building in 1925 according to plans by Ödön Hochholzer, a Hungarian architect from Szombathely. After the war, the buildings were partially renovated, but the old mansion was in poor condition. It was demolished in the 1950s, and the construction of the nave began in 1960. The plans were drawn by architect Jamšek from Ljubljana, and the construction work was done by the members of the congregation. The new church was dedicated on 2 July 1962. The church was completely renovated in 2004. In 2014, it was decreed a monument of local importance.

Although the church was constructed in two phases, it successfully blends the traditional elements of early 20th-century ecclesiastical architecture with the simplified, modern clarity of the mid-twentieth century. The overall silhouette is defined by the tall, dominant bell tower that remains a conspicuous landmark in the village's center. The interior is bright and spacious, it combines modest ornamentation with clear lines and harmonious proportions. A new altar and a separate pulpit were built in the 21st century; only the original altarpiece was kept, which is an 1893 oleograph depicting Jesus in the Garden. According to the Hungarian inscription on the edge of the basin, the marble baptismal font was donated to the church by István Kühár and his wife from Mezővár in 1893.

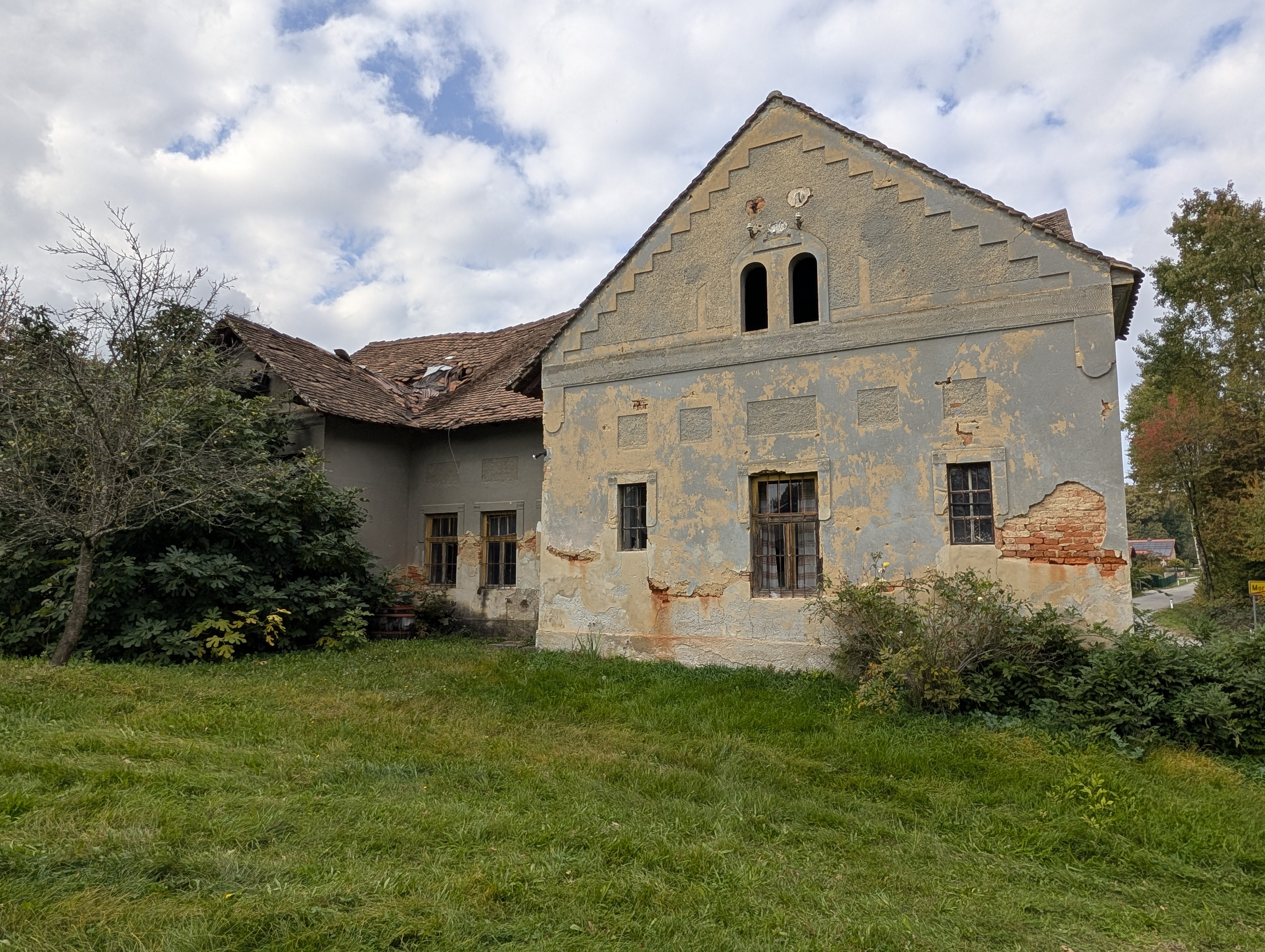
The former Pri Sepu (Szép csárda) inn on the northern edge of the village

A modern chapel was built in the small Catholic cemetery of Zgornji Moravci during the interwar period. The cemetery also contains an early 20th-century cast-iron cross mounted on a stone base and bearing a crucifix with the figure of Christ. A decorative sheet-metal rain canopy is placed above the crucifix.

Old firefighting equipment is displayed in a pavilion in front of the fire station on Dolga ulica. The most important artifact is a horse-drawn hand-pumped fire engine that was produced in 1911 by the Seltenhofer factory in Sopron; it was used by the local fire brigade from 1911 until 1947.

The junction along the old main road from Murska Sobota to Körmend, where today's Dolga ulica branched off toward the village, was a favorable location for an inn. On the Third Military Survey maps, it already appears under the name Szép csárda, suggesting that a former farmstead developed into a roadside inn in the late nineteenth century. Between the world wars, the spot was locally known as Pri Sepu ('at the Szép family's place'). A 1943 newspaper crime report mentions a fatal fight in the yard of Julianna Szép’s tavern at Alsómarác, showing that the establishment was still operating at that time. The surviving gravestone on the property (erected in 1917), together with the documentary evidence, indicates that the place was associated with the Szép family for several generations. The building of the former inn at Dolga ulica 293 is a substantial brick structure with early twentieth-century plaster decoration, now standing empty and in very poor condition.

== Parks ==
The park around the Lutheran church and the rectory was named Prekmurje Reformation Park in 2014. The 0.7-hectare (1.7-acre) large green area has its origins in the garden of the Batthyány-Ernuszt manor house, which had stood there before. A scion of the 440-year-old Žametovka grapevine from Maribor's Lent neighborhood was planted in the park, symbolizing the long-standing friendship between the church communities of Moravske Toplice and Bad Urach in Germany.

Čreta is a forest park near the center of Moravske Toplice, next to Road 442 leading towards Martjanci. The larger part of the 12-hectare (30-acre) wooded area is located south of the regional road, with a smaller, 1.6-hectare (4.0-acre) piece on the other side; the forest is bordered by Lipnica Creek to the east and the Livada Golf Club to the west. Although it is closer to Moravske Toplice, the forest belongs to the territory of Martjanci.

The name refers to the fact that the area was once a swamp (čreta means 'swampy woods' in Slovene). It was originally part of a larger forest that extended to the villages of Sebeborci to the north and Ivanci to the south. Its original extent was recorded by the First Military Survey of the 1780s, which also shows a small stream on the eastern side (only a drainage ditch runs there today). The 1860 cadastral map, on the other hand, shows the forest at its current extent. Due to clearings, by then it had become an isolated patch of woods surrounded by agricultural areas.

A freely accessible exercise trail (Slovene: trim steza) was created in the southern part of the forest with modern fitness equipment and a running track. The trail has two circular tracks: a 1,000-meter (3,300 ft) large circle and a 600-meter (2,000 ft) smaller circle. It was renovated in 2025.

The 18-hole Livada Golf Course, which stretches across 59 hectares, surrounds the thermal complex like a landscaped park. The golf course was completed in May 2005, but the first three playing fields and the driving range had already been opened in the fall of 1998. The decision to build a golf course was influenced by the fact that the health resort complex was previously surrounded by agricultural areas, and the municipality wanted to create a natural green belt around it. The first phase of the project was designed by Marko Božič, director of a golf course in Bled. Existing water bodies in the area were preserved, and indigenous tree species were planted.

== Natural areas ==
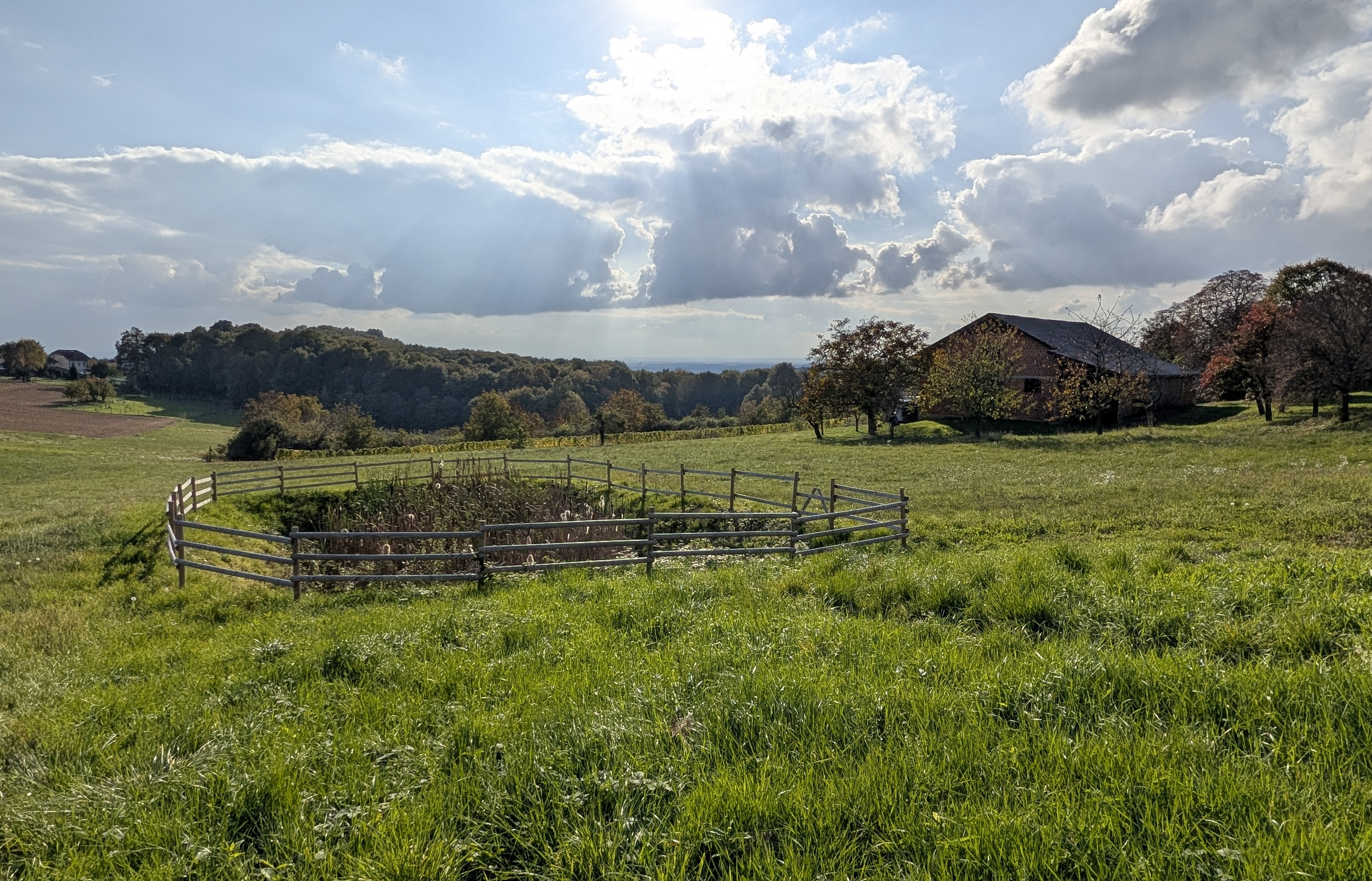
Pasture with man-made watering pond in the Goričko Natural Park in Cuber

The northern part of the village's territory belongs to Goričko Natural Park, which was established in 2003. The same area was placed under Natura 2000 protection in 2004; it forms part of the Goričko Natura2000 Site protected under the Habitats Directive.

A larger wooded area on Rdeči breg (lit. 'red hill') and in the valley of Mostec Creek forms part of the southern continuous forest belt of the natural park. A strip of woods borders Lipnica Creek all the way to Road 442, forming an important green corridor.

In total, approximately 2.35 square kilometers (0.91 sq mi) of the village's territory is covered by forest, 27 percent of the whole area. There are three different types of forest habitats: Illyrian oak-hornbeam forests, collinear beech-oak forests, and riparian forests along the watercourses. The presence of nonnative tree species, especially black locust and Scots pine, poses an ecological problem.

The northern and northeastern parts of the village's territory are a cultivated patchwork landscape, where pastures, vineyards, orchards, hay meadows, and small woodlands intertwine; it was shaped over centuries by traditional farming and local communities. There are small, man-made ponds (mlaka) on fields in Cuber and Moravske Gorice that were used for watering animals; these micro-scale freshwater habitats support rich and valuable biodiversity.
