= Gornji Stupnik =

- Village
- Location within Croatia
- Coordinates: 45°46′N 15°51′E
- Country: Croatia
- County: Zagreb County
- Municipality: Stupnik

Area
  - Total: 8.0 km^{2} (3.1 sq mi)
- Elevation: 100 m (330 ft)

Population (2021)
  - Total: 2,087
  - Density: 260/km^{2} (680/sq mi)
- Time zone: UTC+1 (CET)
  - Summer (DST): UTC+2 (CEST)
- Vehicle registration: ZG

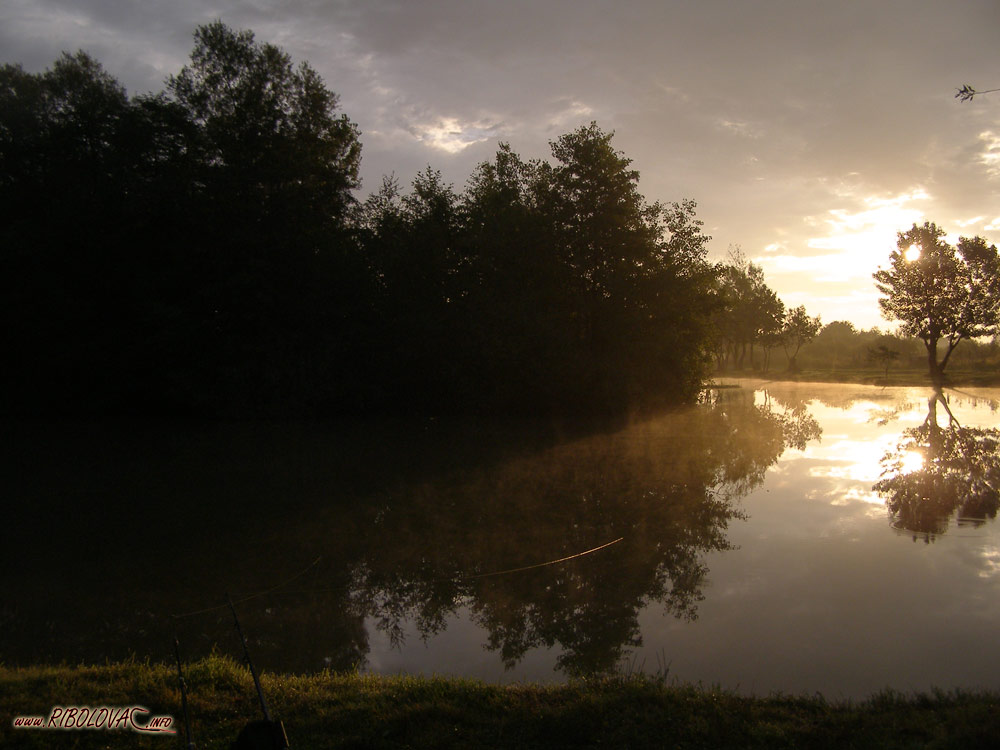

Gornji Stupnik is a village in Croatia. The village is part of the Zagreb County and is connected by the D1 highway.
