= Mihály Zsupánek =

Slovene poet (1830–1905/1898)

Mihály Zsupánek (Slovene: Mihael Županek; 7 March 1830 – 19 January 1905 or 24 January 1898) was a Slovene poet in Hungary, the father of János Zsupánek and grandfather of Vilmoš Županek.

Born in Šalovci (Prekmurje), his parents were Péter Zsupanek and Judit Tolvay. He fought in the Second Italian War of Independence and he participated in the Battle of Solferino. In Carniola he learned standard Slovene hymns.

In Dolenci he was an assistant cantor and preserved an old Prekmurje Slovene hymnal, as Ferenc Sbüll the poet replaced the old hymns. Some hymns are from the Old Hymnal of Martjanci.

Zsupánek also wrote Hungarian hymns.

== Works ==
- Peszmaricza (1865)
- Nedelne peszmi (1867)
- Énekeskönyv (c. 1865)
- Military hymns
- Csudálatos kép
- Litanije Szrcza Jezus
- Mrtvecsne peszmi (c. 1875)
- Poszlüsajte krscseniczi

== See also ==
- List of Slovene writers and poets in Hungary
