= Miska Magyarics =

Miska Magyarics, official name Mihály Magyarics, (Slovene: Miška Madjarič, Mihál Madjarič) (31 January 1825 – 8 January 1883) was a Hungarian Slovene poet.

Magyarics was born in Mali Dolenci in the Kingdom of Hungary (now Dolenci, Slovenia). His parents were Jakab Magyarics, a Roman Catholic peasant, and Anna Messics. In the second half of the 19th century by right of the tradition of his village, Magyarics wrote a Catholic hymnal in Prekmurje Slovene (279 pages and 115 hymns).

He died in Mali Dolenci and was buried at Dolenci Cemetery near St. Nicholas's Church on 10 January 1883.

== See also ==
- List of Slovene writers and poets in Hungary

== Literature ==
- Ivan Škafar: Bibliografija prekmurskih tiskov od 1715 do 1919, Ljubljana 1978.
