= Ferenc Novák (writer) =

Hungarian Slovene Roman Catholic priest and writer

Ferenc Novák (Slovene: Franc Novak, Prekmurje Slovene: Ferenc Novak) (December 7, 1791 – January 21, 1836) was a Hungarian Slovene Roman Catholic priest and writer.

Novák was born in Tesanócz, Kingdom of Hungary (today Tešanovci, Slovenia) to János and Julianna Novák, a petty noble family. His ordination took place on September 10, 1815. He served as a curate in Bellatincz (today Beltinci, Slovenia) - for 16 months and later became an administrator in Mártyáncz (today Martjanci, Slovenia) in 1816. In March 1817 he served as the parish priest of Turnicsa (today Turnišče, Slovenia).

Novák gathered old folk songs from the Slovene March. His work was also used by Stanko Vraz.

== Sources ==
- Géfin Gyula: A Szombathelyi Egyházmegye története (1777–1935), Martineum Könyvnyomda Rt. Szombathely 1935.
- Dr. Jože Alojz – Janez Sraka: Prekmurci in Prekmurje, Chicago 1984.

== See also ==
- List of Slovene writers and poets in Hungary
