= Stupnik =

- Municipality
- Municipality of Stupnik
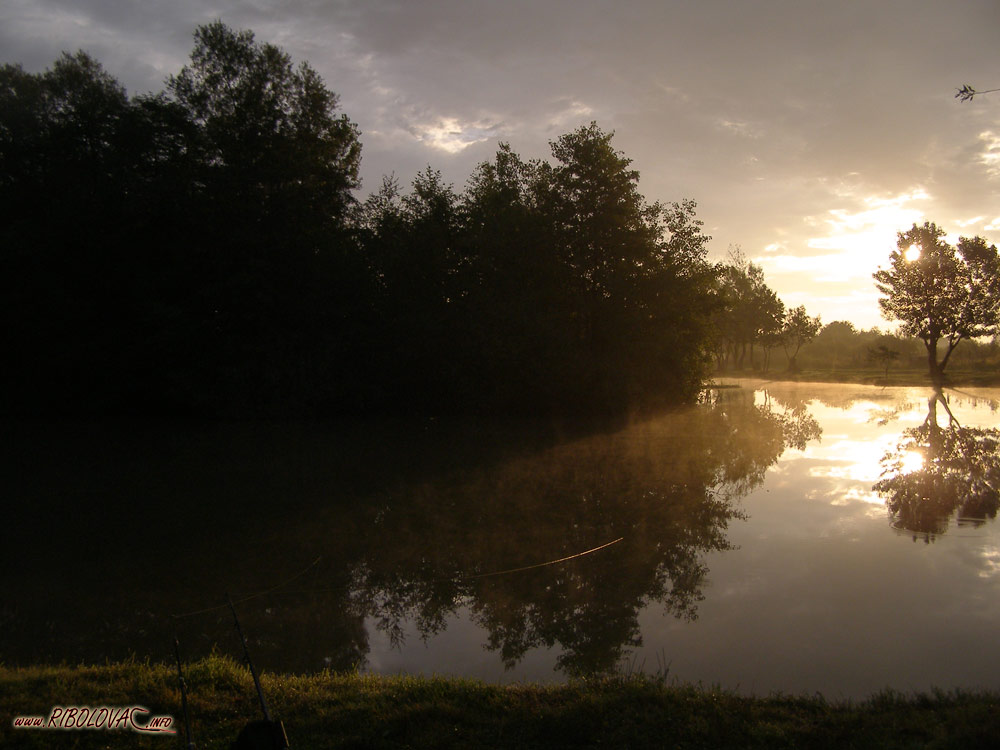
- Interactive map of Stupnik
- Location of Stupnik in Croatia
- Coordinates: 45°46′0.12″N 15°51′0.00″E
- Country: Croatia
- County: Zagreb County

Area
  - Total: 24.8 km^{2} (9.6 sq mi)

Population (2021)
  - Total: 3,886
  - Density: 157/km^{2} (406/sq mi)
- Time zone: UTC+1 (Central European Time)
- Vehicle registration: ZG
- Website: stupnik.hr

Stupnik is a municipality in Croatia in the Zagreb County.

In the 2011 census, there were 3,251 inhabitants, in the following settlements:

- Donji Stupnik, population 1,375
- Gornji Stupnik, population 2,003
- Stupnički Obrež, population 357

In the same census, 95% of the population was Croats.
