= János Zsupánek =

Slovene writer and poet (1861–1951)

János Zsupánek or Zsupanek (Slovene: Janoš Županek; January 6, 1861 – March 11, 1951) was a Slovene writer and poet in Hungary, son of the poet and writer Mihály Zsupánek. His son Vilmos Zsupánek was also a writer and poet. The three Zsupáneks transcribed some older hymns and also wrote new hymns and poems in the Prekmurje Slovene dialect.

Zsupánek was born in Šalovci. His mother was Mária Gomilár. Zsupánek went on pilgrimages to Graz, Mariazell, Maribor, and the Slovene Hills and he became familiar with many hymns in German, Hungarian, and Latin, as well as hymns in the Slovene Hills dialect, closely related to the Prekmurje dialect.

Zsupánek wrote his first hymns in Hungarian. In 1908, he published his prayer book and hymnal Vu Iméni Ocsé, i Sziná, i Dühá, szvétoga Ámen (In the Name of the Father, and the Son, and the Holy Spirit, Amen). In 1910 he published the Prekmurje dialect hymnal Mrtvecsne peszmi (Dirges). Its publication was supported by Miklós Kovács and József Konkolics from Šalovci.

János Zsupánek died in Šalovci.

== Works ==
- Magyar dalok (Hungarian Songs, 1884–1893)
- Vu iméni Ocsé, i Sziná, i Dühá, szvétoga Ámen (In the Name of the Father, and the Son, and the Holy Spirit, Amen, 1908)
- Mrtvecsne peszmi (Dirges, 1910)
- Szenje blázsene device Marie (The Fair of the Blessed Virgin Mary, in Novine, 1916)

== See also ==
- List of Slovene writers and poets in Hungary
