= Turnišče =

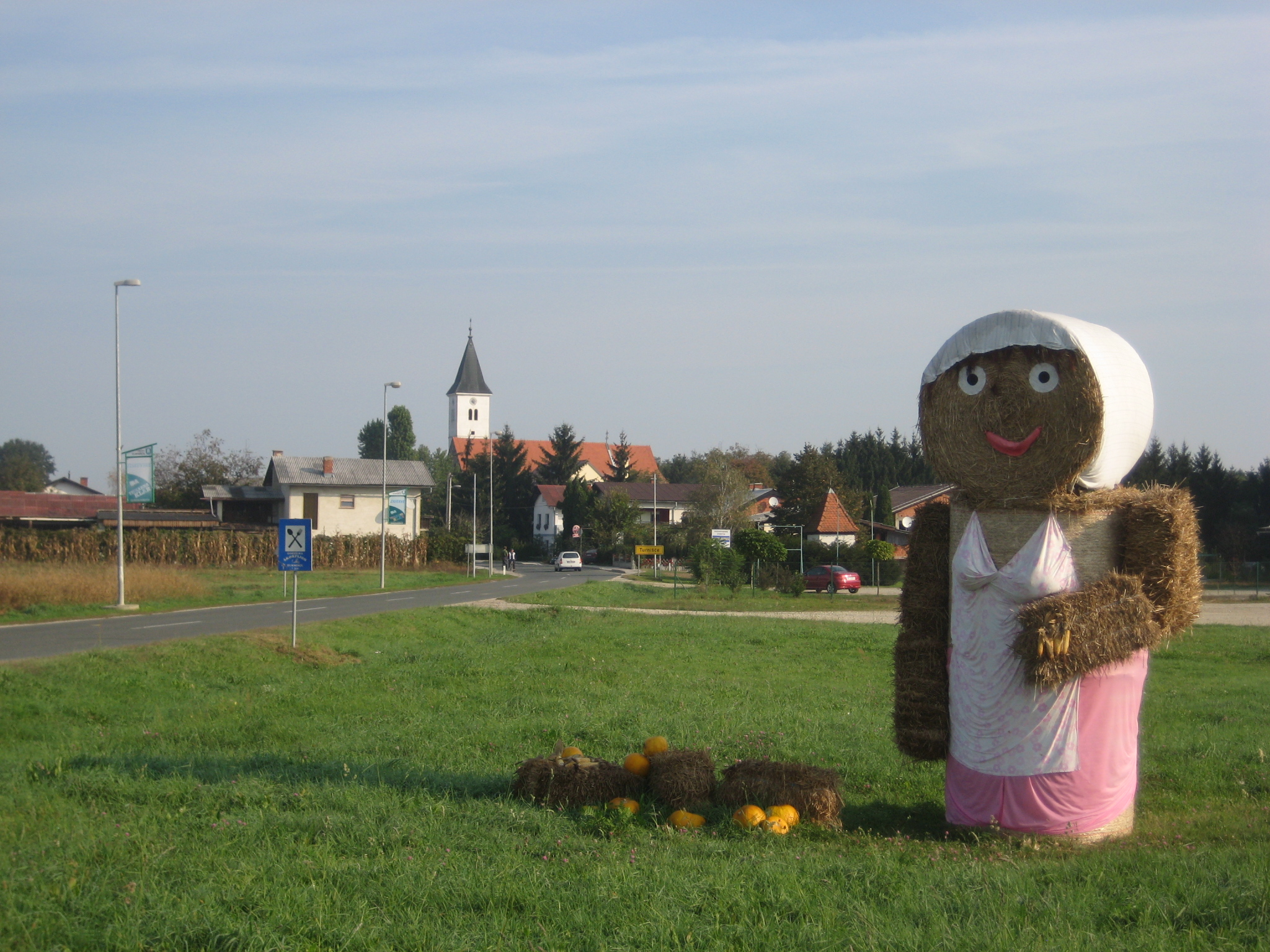

- Flag Coat of arms

- Location in Slovenia
- Coordinates: 46°37′9.76″N 16°19′20.42″E
- Country: Slovenia
- Traditional region: Prekmurje
- Statistical region: Mura
- Municipality: Turnišče

Area
  - Total: 8.1 km^{2} (3.1 sq mi)
- Elevation: 169.7 m (557 ft)

Population (2012)
  - Total: 1,506

Turnišče (pronounced [ˈtuːɾniʃtʃɛ]; Hungarian: Bántornya, Prekmurje Slovene: Törnišče, German: Turnitz) is a town in Slovenia. It is the seat of the Municipality of Turnišče.

== Name ==
Turnišče was first mentioned in written sources as Thoronhel in 1379, then as Turnicha in 1389, Tornischa in 1403, Tornisa in 1405, Thornisca in 1411, Tornissa in 1428, Thurnissa in 1481, Tornysthya in 1524. Until the second half the 19th century, Turnicsa, Turnisa or Turnische was used, when it was changed to Bántornya. The name is derived from the common noun turen 'tower' and thus refers to a town in which a tower stood. The word turen itself ultimately goes back to Greek τύρσις 'fortified settlement' (via Latin turris 'tower, castle' and Middle High German turn 'tower').

== History ==
Turnišče was granted market rights in 1524, and town privileges in 1548.

== Churches ==
The parish church in Turnišče is dedicated to the Virgin Mary and belongs to the Roman Catholic Diocese of Murska Sobota. It is a three-aisled basilica, added in 1914 onto a smaller Gothic church.

There is also a church dedicated to the Assumption of Mary in the settlement, dating from the mid-13th century. The apse is originally Romanesque. The nave is Gothic and covered in wall paintings by the 14th-century local artist Johannes Aquila, who also painted the churches in Velemér, Martjanci, and Fürstenfeld.

== Notable people ==
Notable people that were born or lived in Turnišče include:

- Štefan Barbarič (1920–1988), technical writer and literary historian
- József Klekl (1879–1936), writer, journalist, and Roman Catholic priest
- Ferenc Novák (1719–1836), folksong collector and religious writer
- Ferenc Sbüll (1825–1864), Hungarian Slovene poet
- Štefan Skledar (1920–1988), chemical engineer
- József Szakovics (1874–1930), Roman Catholic priest and author
- Vilmos Tkálecz (1894–1950), politician
