= Brckovljani =

- Municipality
- Municipality of Brckovljani
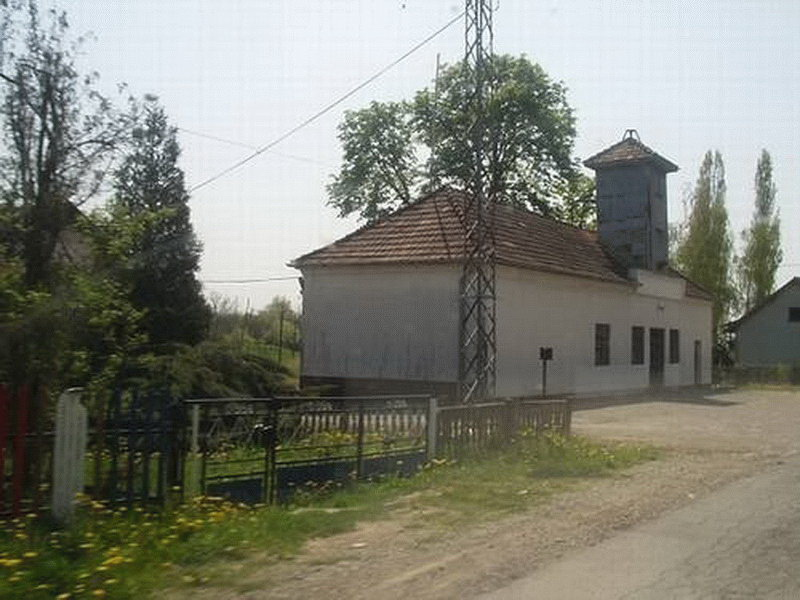
- House in Brckovljani
- Interactive map of Brckovljani
- Location of Bedenica in Croatia
- Coordinates: 45°49′48″N 16°18′0″E
- Country: Croatia
- Region: Central Croatia
- County: Zagreb County

Area
  - Municipality: 69.8 km^{2} (26.9 sq mi)
  - Urban: 2.7 km^{2} (1.0 sq mi)

Population (2021)
  - Municipality: 5,876
  - Density: 84.2/km^{2} (218/sq mi)
  - Urban: 1,368
  - Urban density: 510/km^{2} (1,300/sq mi)
- Time zone: UTC+1 (Central European Time)
- Vehicle registration: ZG
- Website: brckovljani.hr

Brckovljani is a village and a municipality in Zagreb County, Croatia.

According to the 2001 Croatian census, there are 6,837 inhabitants, in the following settlements:

- Božjakovina – 178
- Brckovljani – 1,542
- Gornja Greda – 625
- Gornje Dvorišće – 66
- Gračec – 1,127
- Hrebinec – 242
- Kusanovec – 49
- Lupoglav – 1,086
- Prečec – 220
- Prikraj – 603
- Stančić – 687
- Štakorovec – 315
- Tedrovec – 97

98.54% of the population are Croats.
