= Tešanovci =

Tešanovci Mezővár
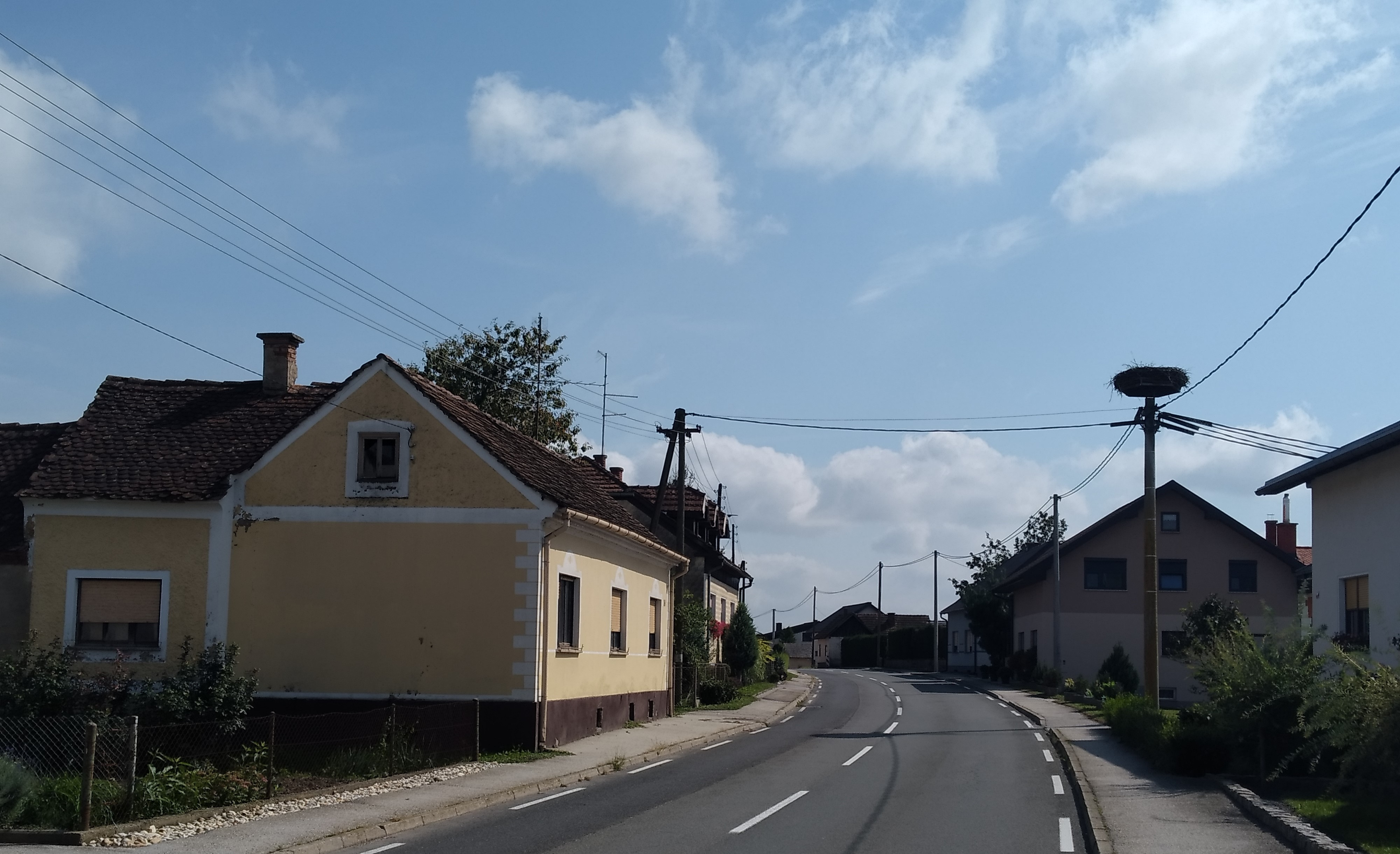

- Location in Slovenia
- Coordinates: 46°40′46.83″N 16°14′16.97″E
- Country: Slovenia
- Traditional region: Prekmurje
- Statistical region: Mura
- Municipality: Moravske Toplice

Area
  - Total: 7.37 km^{2} (2.85 sq mi)
- Elevation: 185.1 m (607 ft)

Population (2002)
  - Total: 375

Tešanovci (pronounced [ˈteːʃanɔu̯tsi]; Hungarian: Mezővár) is a village immediately east of Moravske Toplice in the Prekmurje region of Slovenia.

There is a small chapel in the village with a three-storey belfry, built in the early 20th century.

== Notable people ==
- Ferenc Novák (1791–1836), writer
