= Ferenc Sbüll =

Hungarian Slovene poet and Catholic priest (1825–1864)

Ferenc Sbüll (Slovene: Fran Šbül or Žbul) (around July 26, 1825 – August 12, 1864) was a Hungarian Slovene poet and Catholic priest in Hungary. He was born in Turnišče, a village in the Prekmurje region of Slovenia, then part of Zala County in the Kingdom of Hungary. He studied in Kőszeg, Szombathely, and Vienna. He wrote both secular and religious poetry in his native Prekmurje Slovene. He died in Dolenci.

== See also ==
- List of Slovene writers and poets in Hungary
