= Božjakovina =

- Village (Selo)
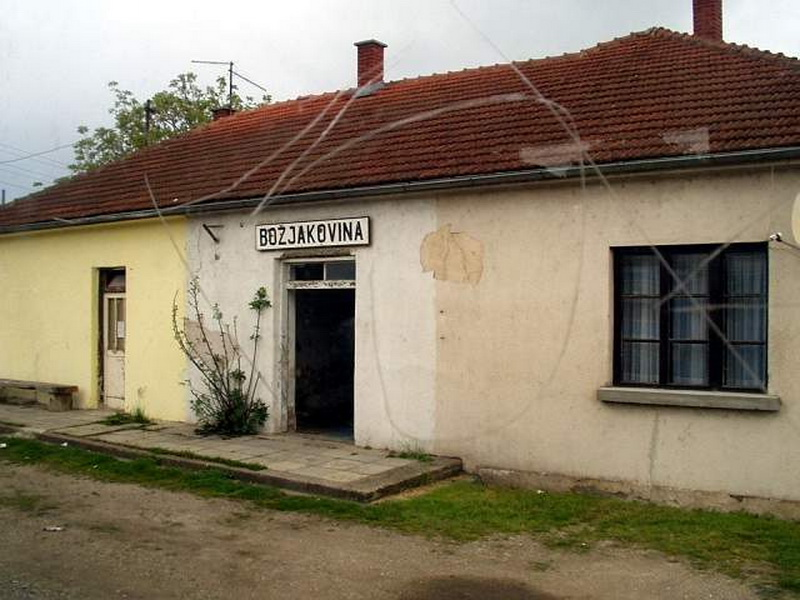
- Bozjakovina Train Station
- Interactive map of Božjakovina
- Location within Croatia
- Coordinates: 45.83°N 16.31°E
- Country: Croatia
- County: Zagreb County
- Municipality: Brckovljani

Area
  - Total: 2.6 km^{2} (1.0 sq mi)
- Elevation: 100 m (330 ft)

Population (2021)
  - Total: 144
  - Density: 55/km^{2} (140/sq mi)

Božjakovina is a village in central Croatia.

== Climate ==
From 1981 to 1989, the highest temperature recorded at the local weather station was 36.7 °C (98.1 °F), on 9 August 1981. The coldest temperature was −24.4 °C (−11.9 °F), on 11 January 1985.

== Demographics ==
Village of Božjakovina: Population trends 1857–2021
v

population	75	45	38	103	228	220	257	226	263	298	285	265	275	227	216	178	144
	1857	1869	1880	1890	1900	1910	1921	1931	1948	1953	1961	1971	1981	1991	2001	2011	2021

Sources: Croatian Bureau of Statistics publications
