= József Klekl (writer) =

Slovene writer, journalist and Roman Catholic priest

- Jožef Klekl
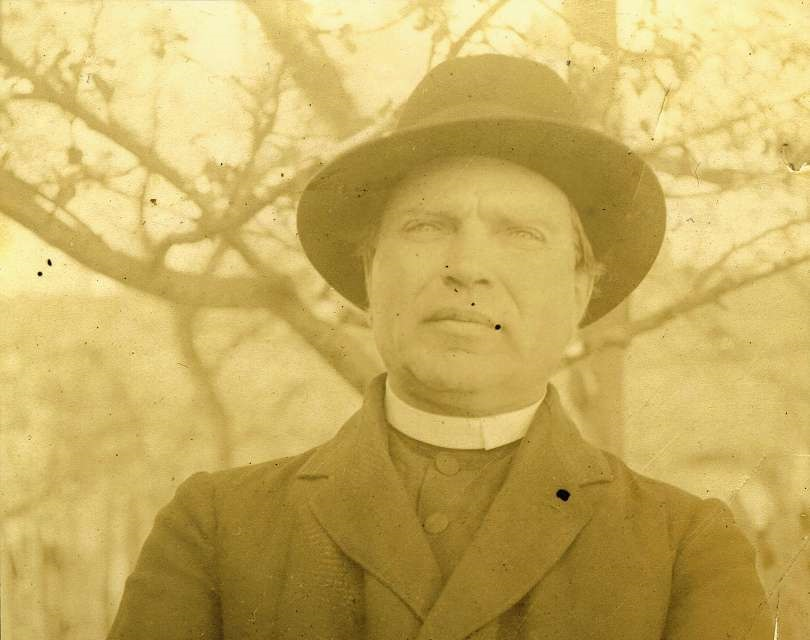
- József Klekl in 1934 (Kalendar Srca Jezušovoga, 1936).
- Born: March 3, 1879; Krajna, Slovene March, Transleithania, Austria-Hungary
- Died: September 24, 1936 (aged 57); Dolenci, Drava Banovina, Kingdom of Yugoslavia
- Occupation(s): Writer, Catholic priest, journalist

József Klekl Jr. (Slovene: Jožef Klekl, 3 March 1879 – 24 September 1936) was a Slovene writer, journalist, and Roman Catholic priest in Hungary, later in Prekmurje (the Slovene March).

Klekl was born in Krajna, near Tišina, the son of András Klekl and Anna Lülik. András Klekl's brother was István Klekl, the father of József Klekl, who was a Slovene politician and also a Catholic priest. The grandfather of the Klekl brothers, Anton Klekl, was of German descent from Prlekija.

Klekl was ordained on 27 June 1902 in Szombathely. For four years he was a curate in Sveti Jurij, near Rogašovci, one year in Rechnitz among the Burgenland Croats, three years in Turnišče, and one year in Murska Sobota. By 1911 he was priest in Dolenci, where he died in 1936.

From 1906 to 1919 he served as the editor of the Prekmurje Slovene almanac Kalendar Srca Jezušovoga, and from 1918 to 1919 was the editor of the newspaper Novine. In 1918 he supported the program for an autonomous Slovene March (Slovenska krajina) in Hungary or Slovenia. After World War I he supported the use of the Prekmurje dialect. His articles were highly critical of communism.

There is a statue of Klekl near St. Nicholas's Church in Dolenci.

== See also ==
- List of Slovene writers and poets in Hungary

== Literature ==
- Géfin Gyula A Szombathelyi Egyházmegye története: 1777-1935 III. kötet, Szombathely Martineum Ny., 1935.
- Stopinje 2003, Murska Sobota 2002.
- Franc Kuzmič: Bibliografija Jožefa Klekla mlajšega
