= Šalovci =

Šalovci Sal (Hungarian)
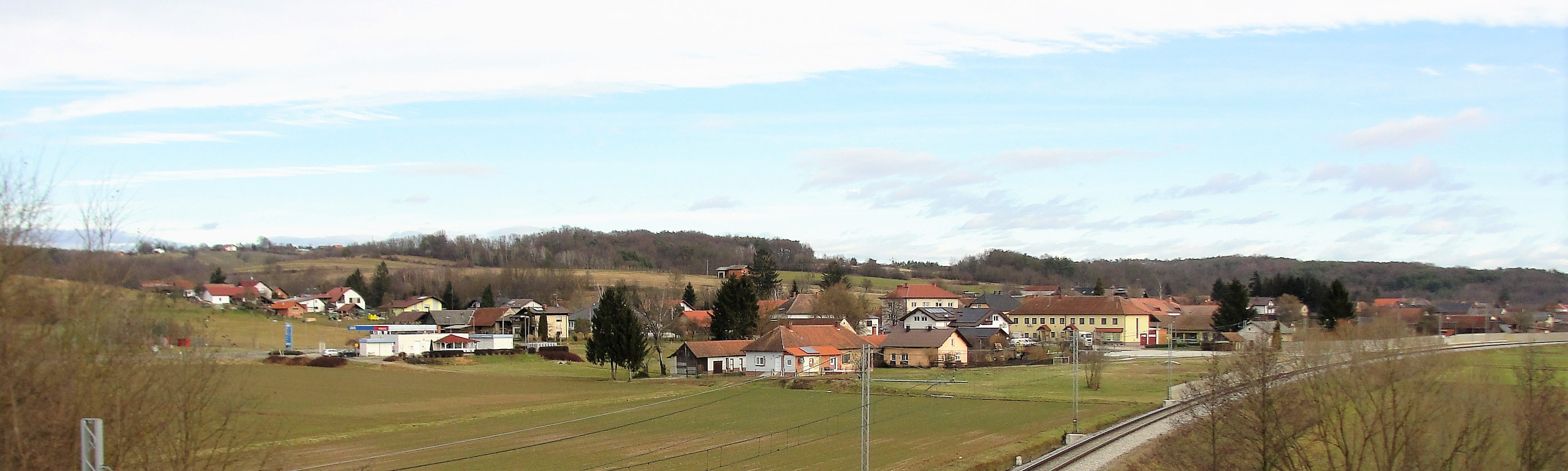

- Flag Coat of arms

- Location in Slovenia
- Coordinates: 46°49′30″N 16°17′53″E
- Country: Slovenia
- Traditional region: Prekmurje
- Statistical region: Mura
- Municipality: Šalovci

Area
  - Total: 15.35 km^{2} (5.93 sq mi)
- Elevation: 241.9 m (794 ft)

Population (2021)
  - Total: 392
  - Density: 25.5/km^{2} (66.1/sq mi)

Šalovci (pronounced [ˈʃaːlɔu̯tsi]; Hungarian: Sal) is a village in the Prekmurje region in northeastern Slovenia. It is the seat of the Municipality of Šalovci. The writer Mihály Bakos was born in the village.
