= Donji Stupnik =

Coordinates: 45°44′30″N 15°51′51″E

- Interactive map of Donji Stupnik

Donji Stupnik is a village in the municipality of Stupnik, Croatia. In the 2011 census, it had 1,375 inhabitants.
