= Lupoglav, Zagreb County =

Lupoglav
- Village (Selo)
- Location within Croatia
- Coordinates: 45.795°N 16.345°E
- Country: Croatia
- County: Zagreb County
- Municipality: Brckovljani

Area
  - Total: 25.6 km^{2} (9.9 sq mi)

Population (2021)
  - Total: 948
  - Density: 37.0/km^{2} (95.9/sq mi)

Lupoglav is a village in central Croatia, located between Brckovljani and Kloštar Ivanić. The population is 1,086 (census 2011).
