= Dolenci, Šalovci =

Dolenci Dolány
- Location in Slovenia
- Coordinates: 46°51′4.43″N 16°17′15.45″E
- Country: Slovenia
- Traditional region: Prekmurje
- Statistical region: Mura
- Municipality: Šalovci

Area
  - Total: 7.72 km^{2} (2.98 sq mi)
- Elevation: 302.1 m (991 ft)

Population (2002)
  - Total: 206

Dolenci (pronounced [dɔˈleːntsi]; Hungarian: Dolány) is a village in the Municipality of Šalovci in the Prekmurje region of Slovenia, on the border with Hungary.

== Church ==
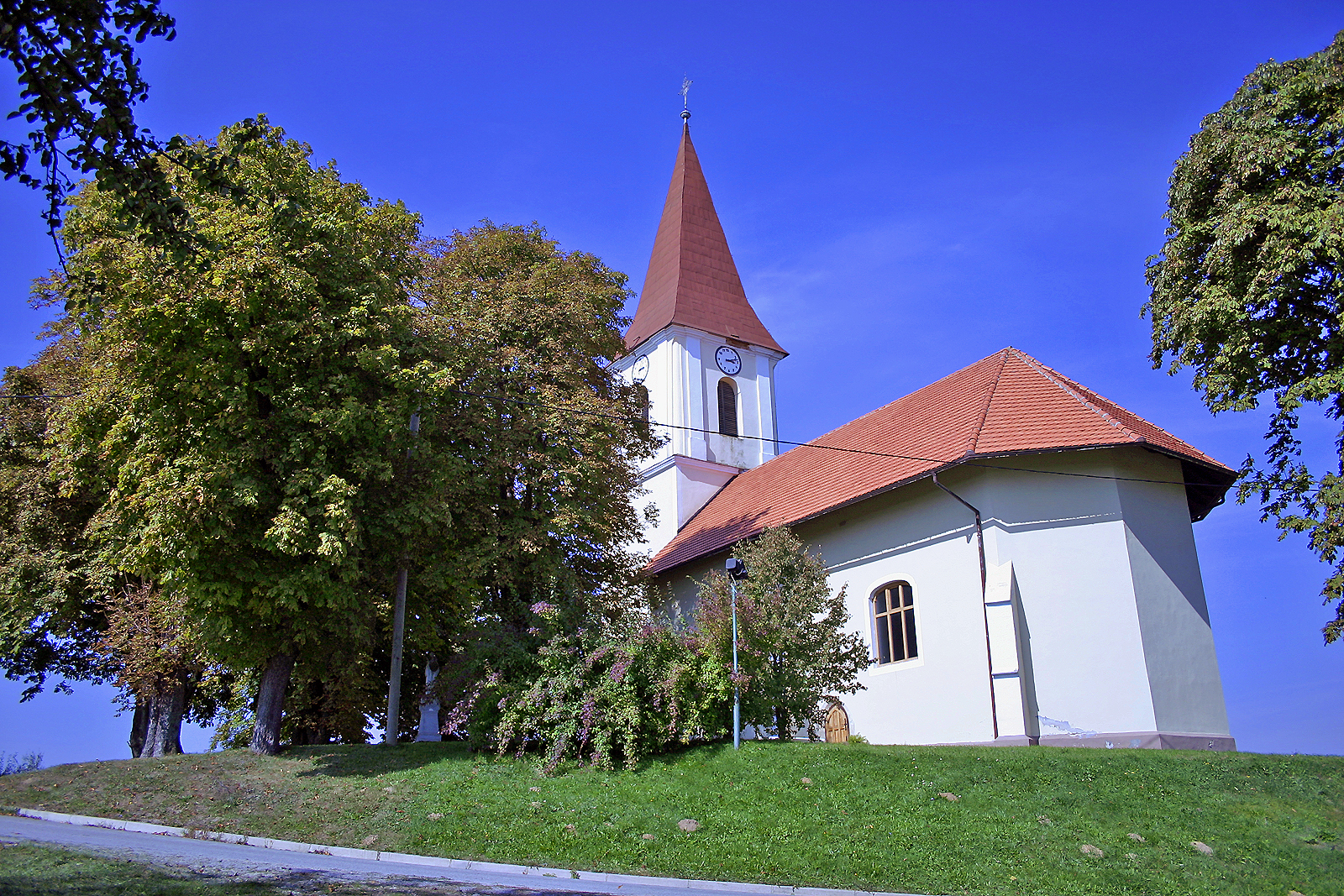
Saint Nicholas's Church

The parish church in the settlement is dedicated to Saint Nicholas and belongs to the Murska Sobota Diocese. The original parts of the church date to 1331, but it was expanded in the 16th century and in the late 18th century. It has a rectangular nave with a Gothic sanctuary and a belfry on its western facade.

== Notable people ==
Notable people that were born or lived in Dolenci include:

- József Klekl Jr. (1879–1936), writer and journalist (parish priest in Dolenci, 1911–1936)
- Feri Lainšček (born 1959), writer, poet, and screenwriter
- Miska Magyarics (1825–1883), poet
- Ferenc Sbüll (1825–1864), poet
