= Areas annexed by Nazi Germany =

European lands annexed by Germany before and during WWII

Clockwise from the north: Memel, Danzig, Polish territories, General Government, Sudetenland, Bohemia-Moravia, Austria (Anschluss), Northern Slovenia, Adriatic littoral, Alpine foothills, Alsace-Lorraine, Luxembourg, Eupen-Malmédy, and Belgien-Nordfrankreich. The areas in light green were the fully annexed territories, while those in dark green were the partially incorporated territories. The territory of Germany before 1938 is shown in blue.

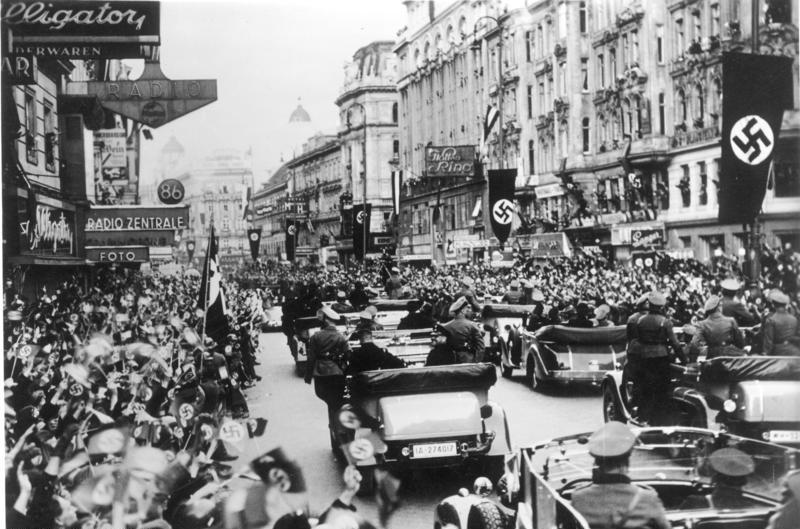
Adolf Hitler greeted by cheering crowds in Vienna, following the annexation of Austria into Nazi Germany, 15 March 1938

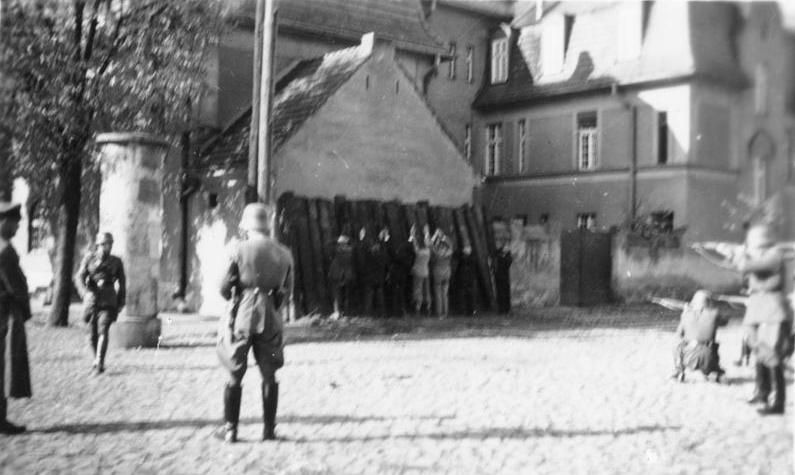
Execution of local Polish people in the town of Kórnik, after the German invasion of Poland, 20 October 1939

There were many areas annexed by Nazi Germany both immediately before and throughout the course of World War II. Territories that were part of Germany before the annexations were known as the "Altreich" (Old Reich).

== Overview ==
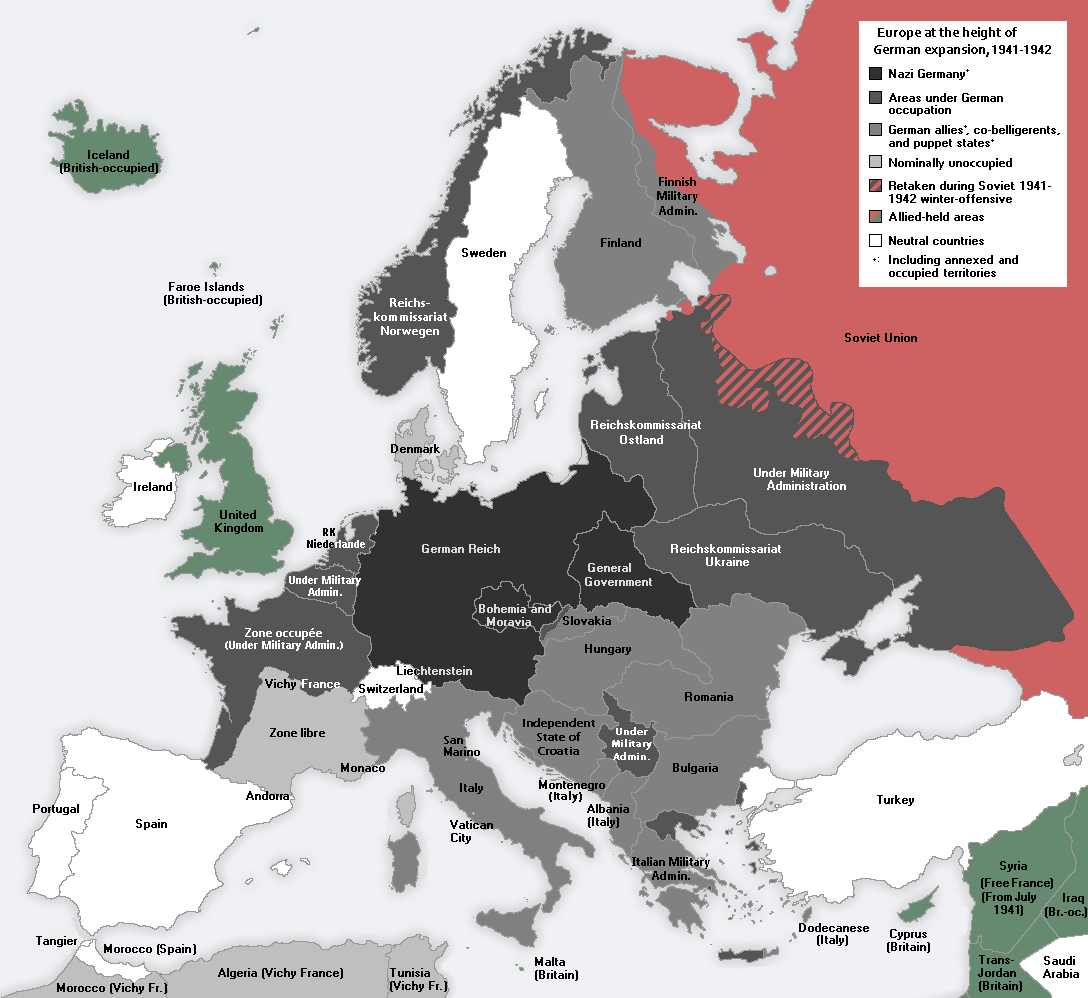
German-occupied Europe at the height of the Axis conquests in 1942

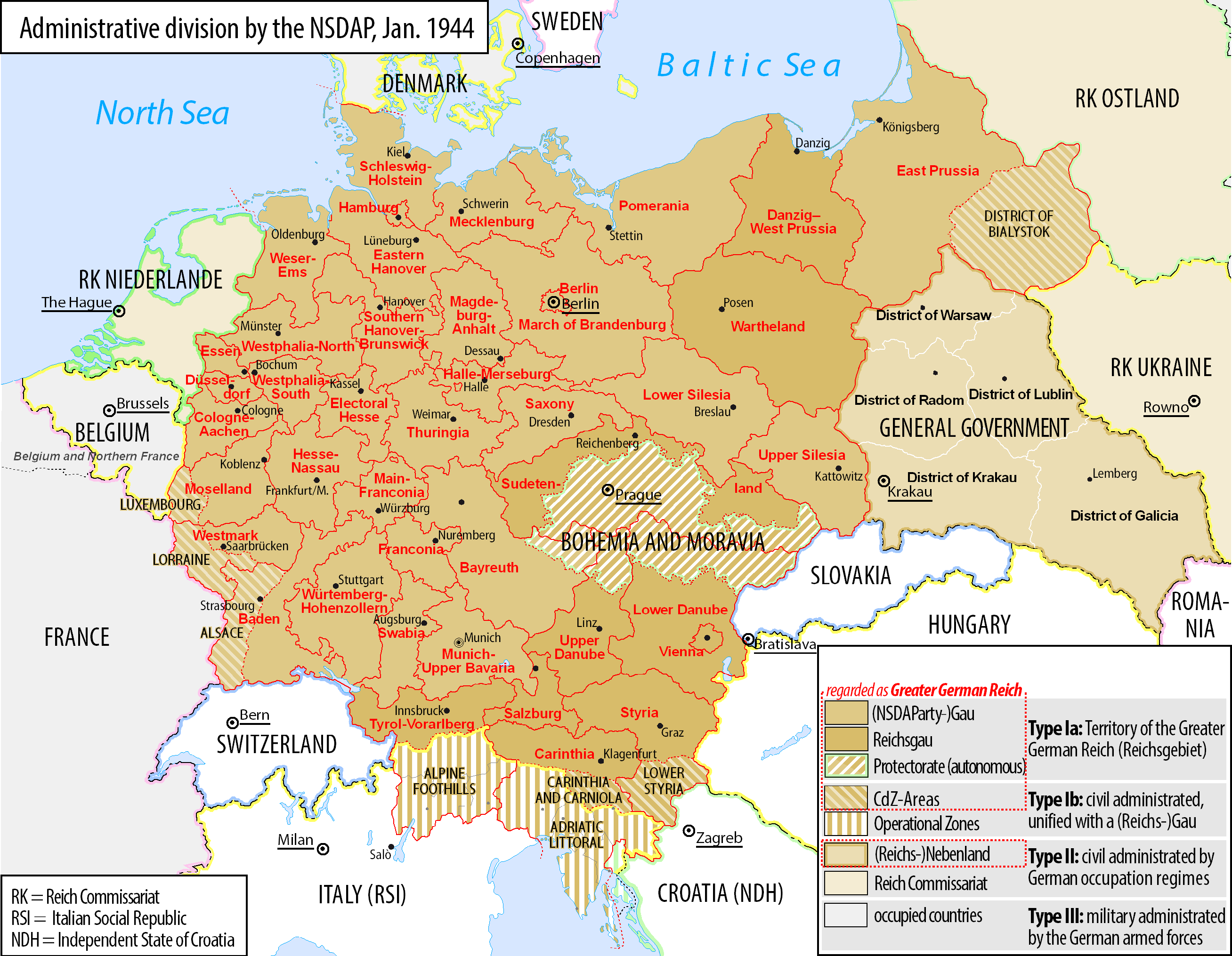
Gaue, Reichsgaue and other administrative divisions of Germany proper in January 1944

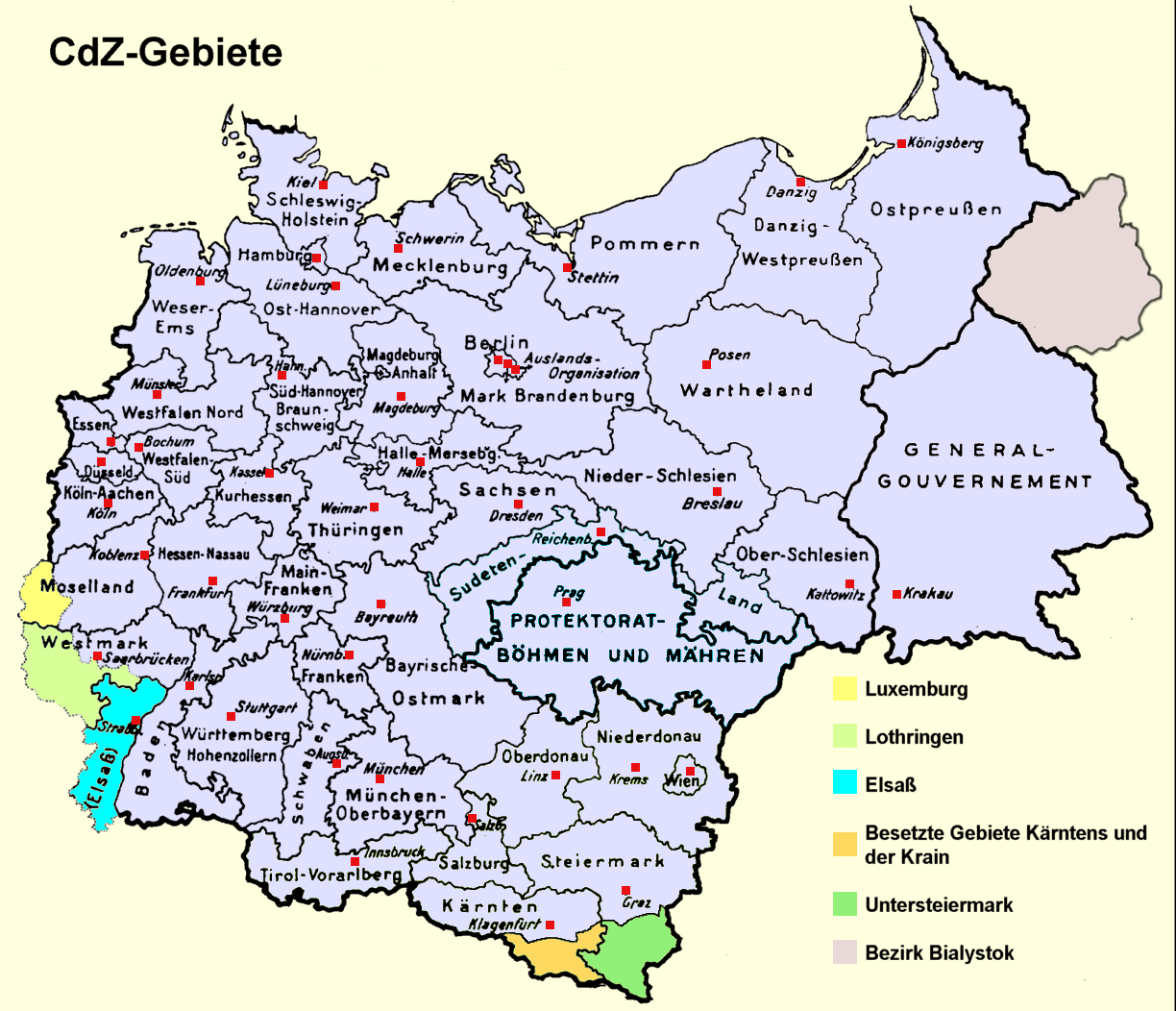
The Third Reich in 1941, with CdZ Areas marked in color

The territorial expansions of Nazi Germany before and during World War II did not follow a uniform structure. Instead, the regime created a complex network of diverse forms of rule and administration, driven by racial ideology and power politics. Austria, the Sudetenland, the Memel Territory, parts of Poland, and Eupen-Malmedy were officially and permanently incorporated into the German Reich by law. The local population was granted Reich citizenship, provided they were classified as being of "German descent." The administration was fully adapted to the German legal system.

The occupied territories of Luxembourg, Alsace, Lorraine, Lower Styria, Upper Carniola, and the Bialystok District were placed under a "Chief of Civil Administration" (CdZ). These regions were annexed de facto and treated as an integral part of the Reich, without any formal declaration under international law. The objective was a gradual, seamless alignment with the Reich ahead of a later, official integration.

The Protectorate of Bohemia and Moravia, as well as the General Government, were semi-autonomous territories that were nevertheless considered an inherent part of the German Reich. The Operational zones, on the other hand, were fully controlled by the Germans and administered like Reich territory, but were not officially considered part of the Reich.

== Fully annexed territories ==
According to the Treaty of Versailles, the Territory of the Saar Basin was split from Germany for at least 15 years. In 1935, the Saarland rejoined Germany in a lawful way after a plebiscite.

The territories listed below are those that were fully annexed into Germany proper.

Areas annexed by Germany
Date of annexation	Annexed area	Succeeded by
13 Mar 1938	Federal State of Austria	Reichsgau Carinthia
13 Mar 1938	Federal State of Austria	Reichsgau Lower Danube
13 Mar 1938	Federal State of Austria	Reichsgau Salzburg
13 Mar 1938	Federal State of Austria	Reichsgau Styria
13 Mar 1938	Federal State of Austria	Reichsgau Tirol-Vorarlberg
13 Mar 1938	Federal State of Austria	Reichsgau Upper Danube
13 Mar 1938	Federal State of Austria	Reichsgau Vienna
21 Nov 1938	Sudetenland, Bohemia, Czechoslovak Republic	Gau Bavarian Eastern March
21 Nov 1938	Sudetenland, Bohemia, Czechoslovak Republic	Reichsgau Upper Danube
21 Nov 1938	Sudetenland, Bohemia, Czechoslovak Republic	Reichsgau Lower Danube
21 Nov 1938	Sudetenland, Bohemia, Czechoslovak Republic	Territory of the Chief of Civil Administration of the Sudetenland
21 Nov 1938	Sudetenland, Moravia-Silesia, Czechoslovak Republic	Reichsgau Lower Danube
21 Nov 1938	Sudetenland, Moravia-Silesia, Czechoslovak Republic	Territory of the Chief of Civil Administration of the Sudetenland
23 Mar 1939	Klaipėda Region, Republic of Lithuania	Gau East Prussia
1 Sep 1939	Free City of Danzig	Territory of the Chief of Civil Administration of Danzig
26 Oct 1939	Military Administration in Poland	Gau East Prussia
26 Oct 1939	Military Administration in Poland	Gau Silesia
26 Oct 1939	Military Administration in Poland	Reichsgau Posen
26 Oct 1939	Military Administration in Poland	Reichsgau West Prussia
9 Nov 1939	Łódź, General Government	Reichsgau Posen
18 May 1940	Eupen-Malmedy, Liège Province, Military Administration in Belgium and Northern France	Gau Cologne-Aachen
2 Aug 1940 (de facto) (Note: Many encyclopedic and popular science sources incorrectly claim that Luxembourg was formally annexed by Nazi Germany on August 30, 1942. Historically and under international law, however, the region remained a purely de facto annexation (CdZ-Gebiet) until the end of the war. On August 30, 1942, the Gauleiter of Luxembourg, Gustav Simon, delivered a speech, he announced the introduction of compulsory military service and the conferral of German citizenship upon the affected conscription years. In Alsace and Lorraine, the exact same step toward conscription had been taken just a few days earlier. However, a formal annexation was not carried out.)	Military Administration of Luxembourg	Territory of the Chief of Civil Administration of Luxembourg
2 Aug 1940 (de facto)	Moselle, French State	Territory of the Chief of Civil Administration of Lorraine
2 Aug 1940 (de facto)	Bas-Rhin, French State	Territory of the Chief of Civil Administration of Alsace
2 Aug 1940 (de facto)	Haut-Rhin, French State	Territory of the Chief of Civil Administration of Alsace
14 Apr 1941 (de facto)	Military Administration in Yugoslavia	Territory of the Chief of Civil Administration of Carinthia and Carniola
14 Apr 1941 (de facto)	Military Administration in Yugoslavia	Territory of the Chief of Civil Administration of Lower Styria
13 Jun 1941 (Note: The four predominantly German-speaking communities were de facto annexed on June 13.) (de facto)	Ocinje, Kingdom of Hungary	Territory of the Chief of Civil Administration of Lower Styria
13 Jun 1941 (de facto)	Kramarovci, Kingdom of Hungary	Territory of the Chief of Civil Administration of Lower Styria
13 Jun 1941 (de facto)	Fikšinci, Kingdom of Hungary	Territory of the Chief of Civil Administration of Lower Styria
13 Jun 1941 (de facto)	Serdica, Kingdom of Hungary	Territory of the Chief of Civil Administration of Lower Styria
1 Aug 1941 (de facto)	Military Administration in the Soviet Union	Bialystok District
1 Nov 1941 (Note: The decree on the demarcation of the Bialystok district of 18 September 1941 separated the area around Grodno from the Reichskommissariat Ostland and incorporated it into the Bialystok district on 1 November 1941.) (de facto)	Grodno, Reichskommissariat Ostland	Bialystok District
8 Dec 1944; 15 Dec 1944 (Note: The Reichskommissariat for Belgium and Northern France was almost completely conquered by the Allies in September 1944 as part of Operation Overlord. Nevertheless, this territory was formally annexed by Nazi Germany. On December 8, the Reichsgau Wallonien was established, and on December 15, the Reichsgau Flandern. Brussels was administered externally as the Distrikt Brüssel. At this time, the Germans occupied only isolated areas in Belgium and northern France, particularly during the Battle of the Bulge. Dunkirk remained occupied by the Germans until May 1945.) (de jure)	Reichskommissariat of Belgium and Northern France	District of Brussels
8 Dec 1944; 15 Dec 1944 (de jure)	Reichskommissariat of Belgium and Northern France	Reichsgau Flanders
8 Dec 1944; 15 Dec 1944 (de jure)	Reichskommissariat of Belgium and Northern France	Reichsgau Wallonia

== Partially incorporated territories ==
The territories listed below are those that were partially incorporated into the Greater German Reich.

Protectorate of Bohemia and Moravia
Date of establishment	Preceded by	Succeeded by
16 Mar 1939	Czechoslovak Republic	Protectorate of Bohemia and Moravia

General Government for the Occupied Polish Territories / General Government
Date of establishment	Preceded by	Succeeded by
26 Oct 1939	Military Administration in Poland	General Government for the Occupied Polish Territories
1 Aug 1941	Military Administration in the Soviet Union	District of Galicia, General Government
1 Aug 1941	Military Administration in the Soviet Union	Kraków District, General Government

Operational zones
Date of establishment	Preceded by	Succeeded by
10 Sep 1943	Province of Gorizia, Kingdom of Italy	Operational Zone of the Adriatic Littoral
10 Sep 1943	Province of Ljubljana, Kingdom of Italy	Operational Zone of the Adriatic Littoral
10 Sep 1943	Province of Pola, Kingdom of Italy	Operational Zone of the Adriatic Littoral
10 Sep 1943	Province of Fiume, Kingdom of Italy	Operational Zone of the Adriatic Littoral
10 Sep 1943	Province of Trieste, Kingdom of Italy	Operational Zone of the Adriatic Littoral
10 Sep 1943	Province of Udine, Kingdom of Italy	Operational Zone of the Adriatic Littoral
10 Sep 1943	Province of Belluno, Kingdom of Italy	Operational Zone of the Alpine Foothills
10 Sep 1943	Province of Bolzano, Kingdom of Italy	Operational Zone of the Alpine Foothills
10 Sep 1943	Province of Trento, Kingdom of Italy	Operational Zone of the Alpine Foothills

== Planned annexations ==
In the coming Nazi New Order, other lands were considered for annexation sooner or later. Territorially speaking, this encompassed the already-enlarged German Reich itself (consisting of pre-1938 Germany proper, Austria, Bohemia, Moravia, Czech Silesia, Alsace-Lorraine, Eupen-Malmedy, Memel, Lower Styria, Upper Carniola, Southern Carinthia, Danzig, and Poland), the Netherlands, the Flemish part of Belgium, Luxembourg, Denmark, Norway, Sweden, Iceland, Liechtenstein, and at least the German-speaking parts of Switzerland. The goal was to unite all or as many as possible ethnic Germans and Germanic peoples, including non-Germanic speaking ones considered "Aryans", in a Greater Germanic Reich.

In Norway, construction of the city of Nordstern began during the German occupation of Norway. It was intended to be administered directly from Germany.

The eastern Reichskommissariats in the vast stretches of Ukraine and Russia were also intended for future integration into that Reich, with plans for them stretching to the Volga or even beyond the Urals, where the potential westernmost reaches of Imperial Japanese influence would have existed, following an Axis victory in World War II. They were deemed of vital interest for the survival of the German nation, as it was a core tenet of Nazism that Germany needed "living space" (Lebensraum), creating a "pull towards the East" (Drang nach Osten) where that could be found and colonized.

North-East Italy was also eventually to be annexed, including both the Operational Zone of the Adriatic Littoral and the Operational Zone of the Alpine Foothills, but also the Venice region. Goebbels went as far as to suggest taking control of Lombardy as well:

Whatever was once an Austrian possession we must get back into our own hands. The Italians by their infidelity and treachery have lost any claim to a national state of the modern type. — Joseph Goebbels, September 1943

The annexation of the entire North Italy was also suggested in the long run.

== See also ==
- Administrative divisions of Nazi Germany
- Former eastern territories of Germany – Eastern territories lost by Germany after World War II in Europe
- Generalplan Ost – Nazi plan for genocide in Eastern Europe
- German-occupied Europe – Aspect of World War II
- German–Soviet Border and Commercial Agreement For the map of a small area Germany annexed in southern Lithuania under the German–Soviet Boundary and Friendship Treaty
- Greater Germanic Reich – State planned by Nazi Germany
- Heim ins Reich – Expansionist Nazi foreign policy slogan
- New Order – Proposed political order by Nazi Germany
- Ostsiedlung – Early and High Middle Age German migration movement to the East
- Pan-Germanism – Pan-nationalist political idea
- Polish areas annexed by Nazi Germany – Territories of Poland annexed during WWII
- Territorial evolution of Germany
