= Szijjártó =

Szijjártó is a surname. Notable people with the surname include:

- István Szijjártó, Slovene poet
- Péter Szijjártó, Hungarian politician
