= Vilmos Tkálecz =

Hungarian-Slovenian politician (1894–1950)

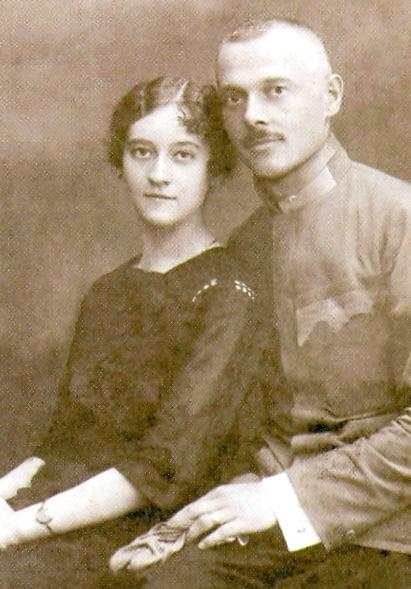
Tkálecz and his wife

Vilmos Tkálecz (Slovene: Vilmoš Tkalec; January 8, 1894 – May 27, 1950) was a Hungarian-Slovenian schoolmaster and politician who served as governor of the short-lived Republic of Prekmurje in summer 1919.

Tkálecz was born on January 8, 1894, in Turnišče, Prekmurje, in Zala County of the Kingdom of Hungary. His father István Tkálecz was an innkeeper, and his mother was Mária Hochhoffer, who was of German descent. In 1917, he enlisted in the army and was sent to Russia. After World War I, he worked as a schoolteacher in Črenšovci (Hungarian: Cserföld), near Lendava.

Under the Hungarian Soviet Republic, Tkálecz was an assistant to the clerk Béla Obál while he stayed in Murska Sobota.

On May 29, 1919, Tkálecz declared Prekmurje a republic; he was named president and his army of 1230 men occupied Zalska and Železna counties. On June 6, the Hungarian Red Army was sent to Murska Sobota and overthrew the state. Tkálecz was captured on August 14th.

Tkálecz went into exile to Austria sometime during 1920, and later found work as a teacher in Nagykarácsony, Hungary, where he remained for many years. After 1929 he changed his name to Vilmos Tarcsay. In 1939 wrote a Prekmurje Slovene textbook called Vend-szlovenszka kniga cstenya. He died in Budapest in 1950.

In 1964 Miško Kranjec wrote a novelisation of the Prekmurje state in The Red Guards.

== See also ==
- Republic of Prekmurje
- List of Slovenian politicians
