= György Kousz =

Hungarian Slovene teacher and writer

György Kousz (Slovene: Juri Kous, Prekmurje Slovene: Jürko Kous) was a Hungarian Slovene teacher and writer. It is unknown if Kousz or the priest of Pertoča István Pauli was the author of the local Prekmurje dialect hymnal.

Few details are known about Kousz's life. His hymnal has 256 church hymns and 1 secular hymn, litanies, and a Saint Matthew's Passion. The last chapter of the hymnal is titled Kniga hisztoriánszka (History Book).

His successor in Pertoča after 1829 was János Kousz, probably György's son.

== See also ==
- List of Slovene writers and poets in Hungary

== Sources ==
- Vis. Can. Perestó, 1808. máj. 8.
- Vilko Novak: Martjanska pesmarica, Založba ZRC. Ljubljana 1997. ISBN 961-6182-27-7
