= István Pauli =

Hungarian Slovene Roman Catholic priest

István Pauli or István Pável (Slovene: Števan Pauli, July 13, 1760 – January 29, 1829) was a Hungarian Slovene Roman Catholic priest. Pauli was the teacher of Pertoča György Kousz, who was the author of a hymnal in Pertoča.

== Early life ==
He was born in Beltinci. His parents were Márk Pável and Katalin Gyrék. In Bratislava, he studied theology, and in 1789, he was ordained.

== Professional career ==
From 1790 to 1797, he was the priest of Pertoča.

== Death ==
On October 1, 1822, he retired to Szombathely and died there sometime later.

== See also ==
- List of Slovene writers and poets in Hungary

== Sources ==
- Vis. Can. Perestó, 1808. máj. 8.
- Vilko Novak: Martjanska pesmarica, ZALOŽBA ZRC. Ljubljana 1997. ISBN 961-6182-27-7
