= Ropoča =

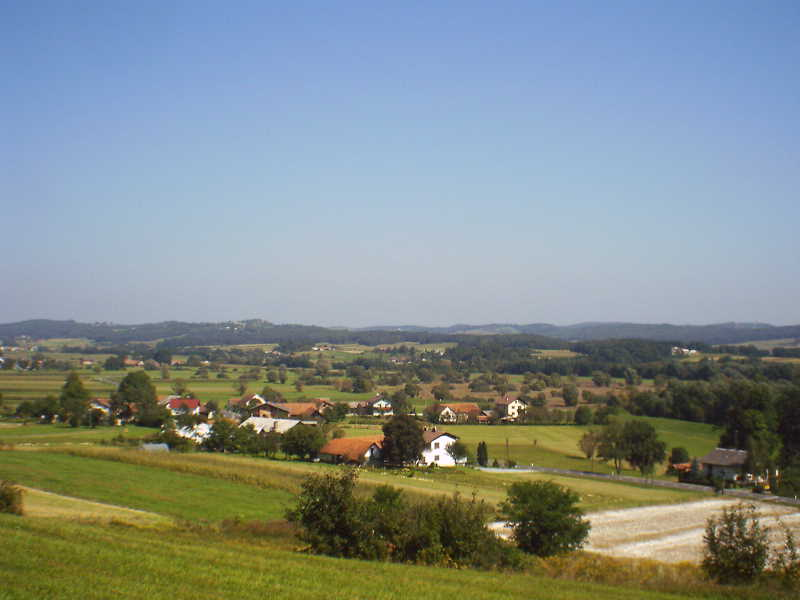

- Location in Slovenia
- Coordinates: 46°45′35.87″N 16°1′30.22″E
- Country: Slovenia
- Traditional region: Prekmurje
- Statistical region: Mura
- Municipality: Rogašovci

Area
  - Total: 3.28 km^{2} (1.27 sq mi)
- Elevation: 318.2 m (1,044 ft)

Population (2002)
  - Total: 234

Ropoča (pronounced [ˈɾoːpɔtʃa]; Hungarian: Rétállás) is a village in the Municipality of Rogašovci in the Prekmurje region of northeastern Slovenia. The Ledava River flows into a reservoir just south of the main settlement.

There is a round chapel in the centre of the village dedicated to the Sacred Heart of Jesus. It belongs to the Parish of Pertoča. It was built in the early 20th century.
