= Nuskova =

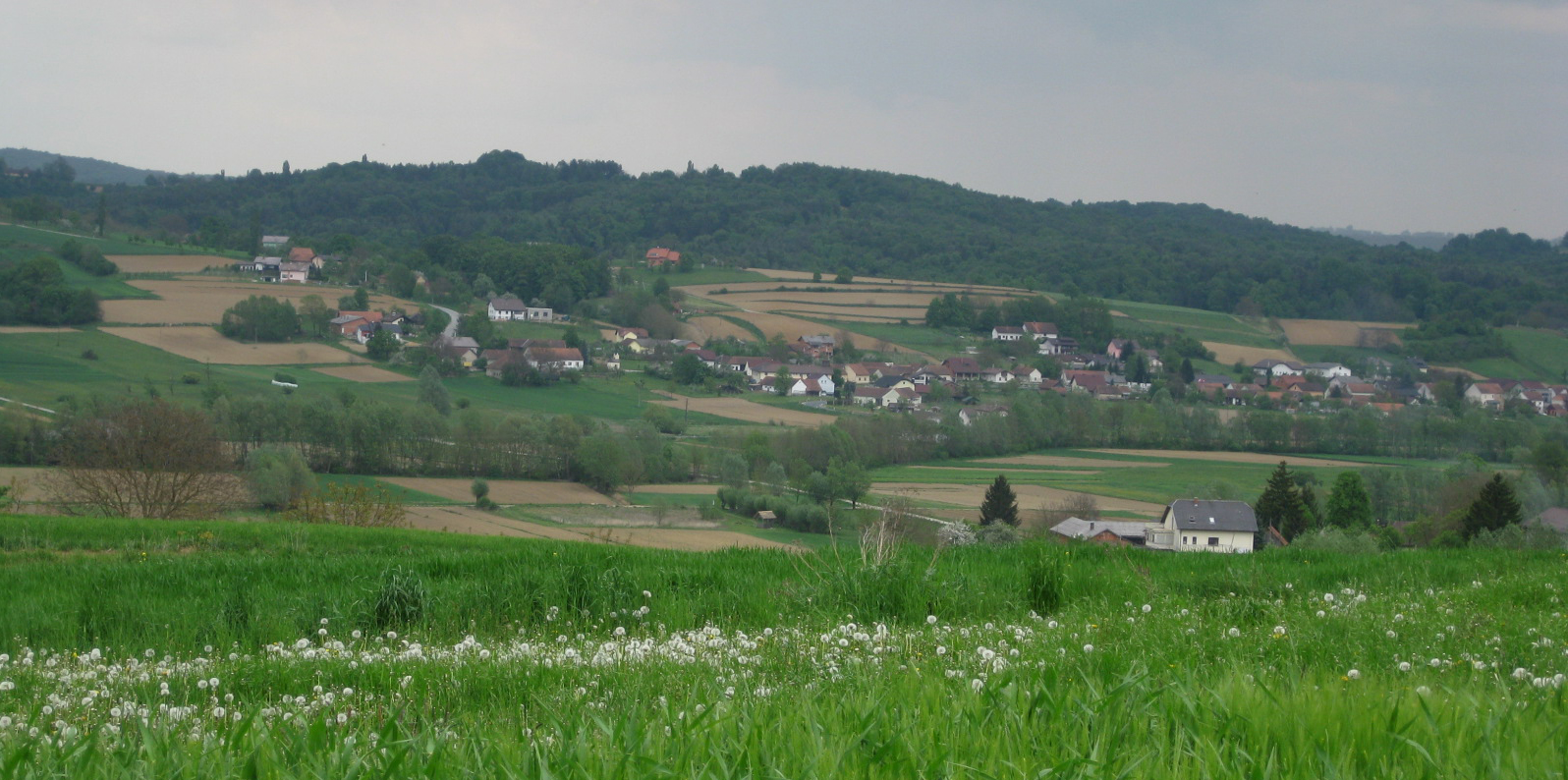

- Location in Slovenia
- Coordinates: 46°48′34.68″N 16°2′2.87″E
- Country: Slovenia
- Traditional region: Prekmurje
- Statistical region: Mura
- Municipality: Rogašovci

Area
  - Total: 2.88 km^{2} (1.11 sq mi)
- Elevation: 245.7 m (806 ft)

Population (2002)
  - Total: 311

Nuskova (pronounced [ˈnuːskɔʋa]; Hungarian: Dióslak, German: Rottenberg) is a village in the Municipality of Rogašovci in the Prekmurje region of northeastern Slovenia.

There is a small chapel in the settlement dedicated to the Holy Trinity. It was built in 1925 and has a small belfry.
