= Municipality of Rogašovci =

Municipality of Slovenia

Municipality of Rogašovci Občina Rogašovci
- Municipality
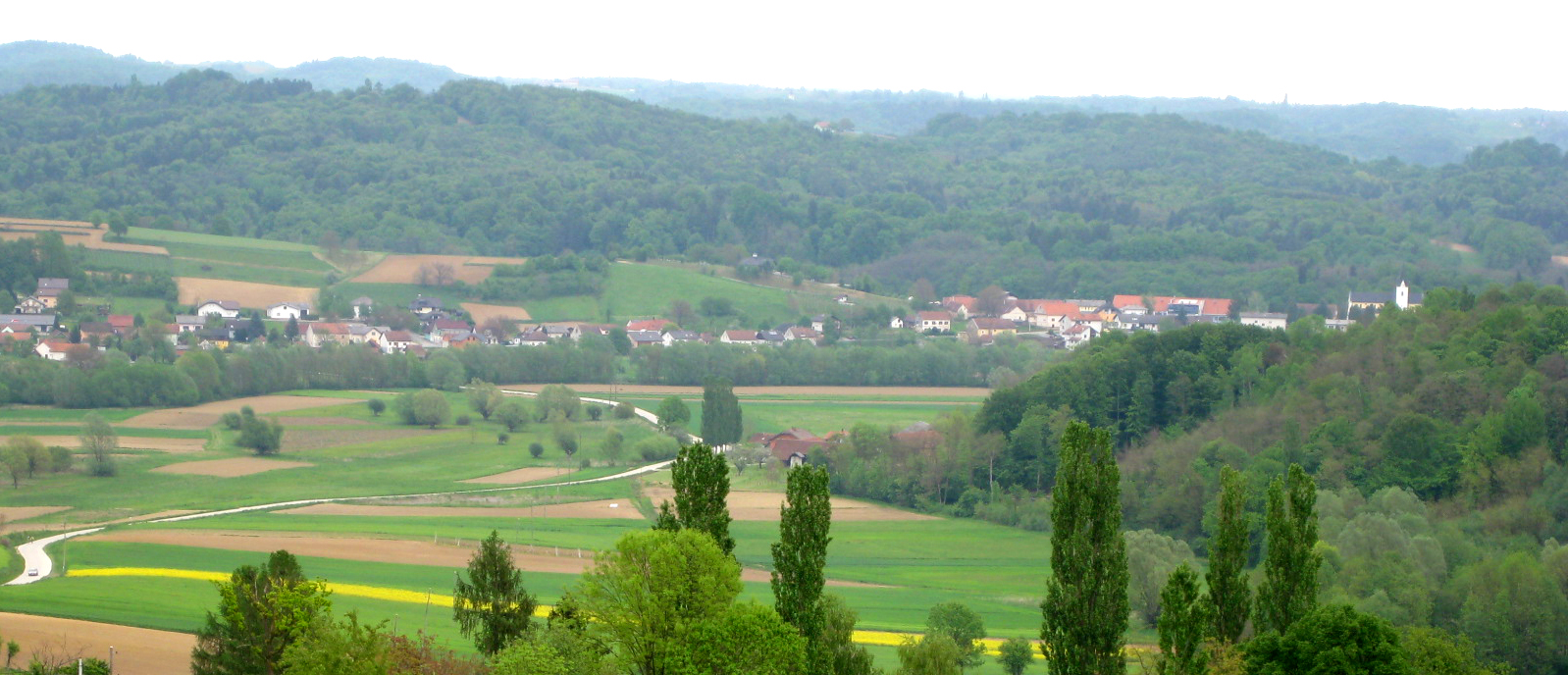

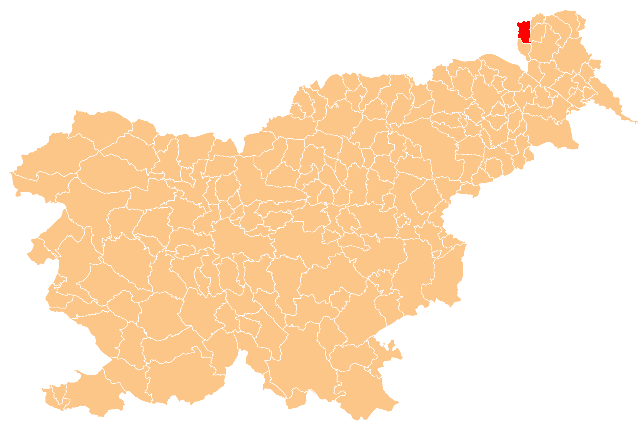
- Location of the Municipality of Rogašovci in Slovenia
- Coordinates: 46°48′N 16°02′E
- Country: Slovenia

Government
  - Mayor: Rihard Peurača

Area
  - Total: 40.1 km^{2} (15.5 sq mi)

Population (July 1, 2018)
  - Total: 3,068
  - Density: 76.5/km^{2} (198/sq mi)
- Time zone: UTC+01 (CET)
  - Summer (DST): UTC+02 (CEST)
- Website: www.obcina-rogasovci.si

The Municipality of Rogašovci (pronounced [ɾɔˈɡaːʃɔu̯tsi]; Slovene: Občina Rogašovci) is a municipality in the traditional region of Prekmurje in northeastern Slovenia. The seat of the municipality is the town of Rogašovci. Rogašovci became a municipality in 1994. It borders Austria.

== Settlements ==
In addition to the municipal seat of Rogašovci, the municipality also includes the following settlements:

- Fikšinci
- Kramarovci
- Nuskova
- Ocinje
- Pertoča
- Ropoča
- Serdica
- Sotina
- Sveti Jurij
- Večeslavci
