= Sveti Jurij, Rogašovci =

Sveti Jurij Jurij (1955–1990) Sveti Güri
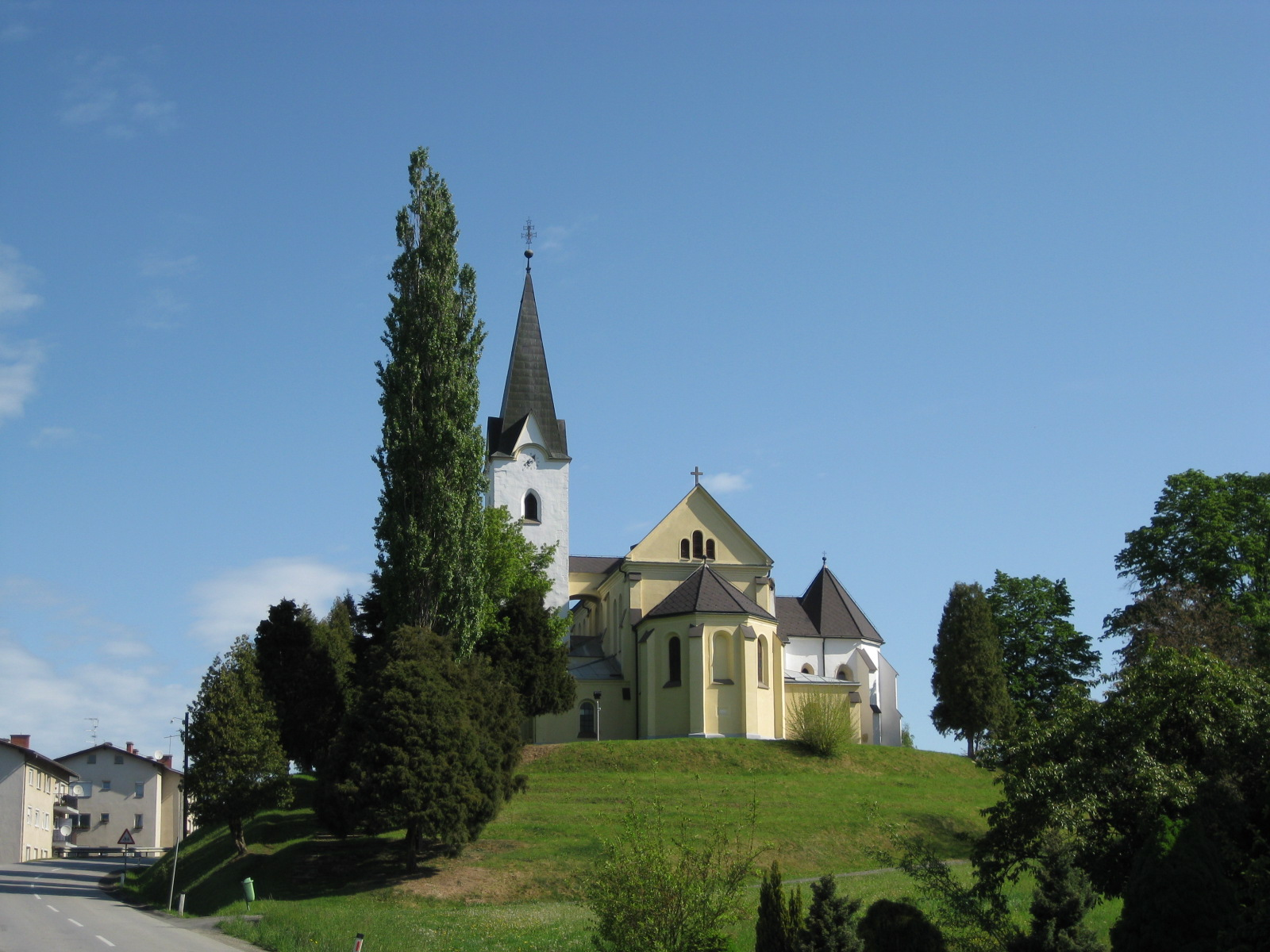

- Location in Slovenia
- Coordinates: 46°47′52.83″N 16°2′10.55″E
- Country: Slovenia
- Traditional region: Prekmurje
- Statistical region: Mura
- Municipality: Rogašovci

Area
  - Total: 3.92 km^{2} (1.51 sq mi)
- Elevation: 236 m (774 ft)

Population (2016)
  - Total: 463

Sveti Jurij (pronounced [ˈsʋeːti ˈjuːɾii̯]; Hungarian: Vízlendva, German: Sankt Georgen, Prekmurje Slovene: Sveti Güri or Sveti Jürij) is a village in the Municipality of Rogašovci in the Prekmurje region of northeastern Slovenia.

== Name ==
The name of the settlement was changed from Sveti Jurij (literally, 'Saint George') to Jurij (literally, 'George') in 1955. The name was changed on the basis of the 1948 Law on Names of Settlements and Designations of Squares, Streets, and Buildings as part of efforts by Slovenia's postwar communist government to remove religious elements from toponyms. The name Sveti Jurij was restored in 1990.

== Church ==
The parish church in the village, from which the settlement gets its name, is dedicated to Saint George. It is a large three-aisle Neo-Romanesque building built in 1925. Elements of the original Gothic building from the late 14th century are preserved in the sanctuary. It belongs to the Roman Catholic Diocese of Murska Sobota.
