= Večeslavci =

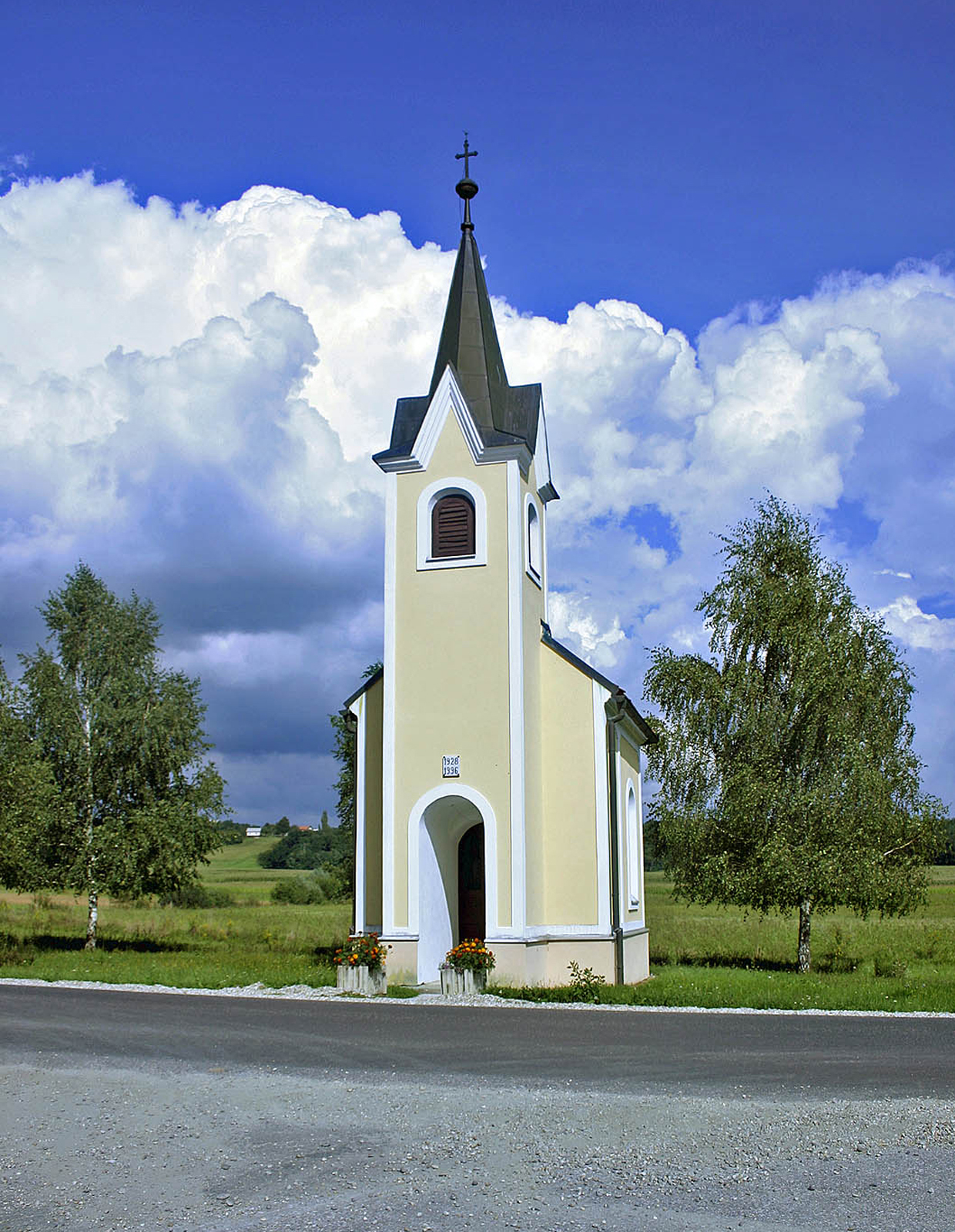
- Chapel in Večeslavci in 2006

- Location in Slovenia
- Coordinates: 46°47′9.29″N 16°2′26.69″E
- Country: Slovenia
- Traditional region: Prekmurje
- Statistical region: Mura
- Municipality: Rogašovci

Area
  - Total: 5.14 km^{2} (1.98 sq mi)
- Elevation: 232.9 m (764 ft)

Population (2002)
  - Total: 393

Večeslavci (pronounced [ʋeˈtʃeːslau̯tsi]; Hungarian: Vasvecsés, German: Sesseldorf or Sessldorf) is a village in the Municipality of Rogašovci in the Prekmurje region of northeastern Slovenia.

The Lutheran teacher and poet István Szijjártó was born in the village.
