= Sotina =

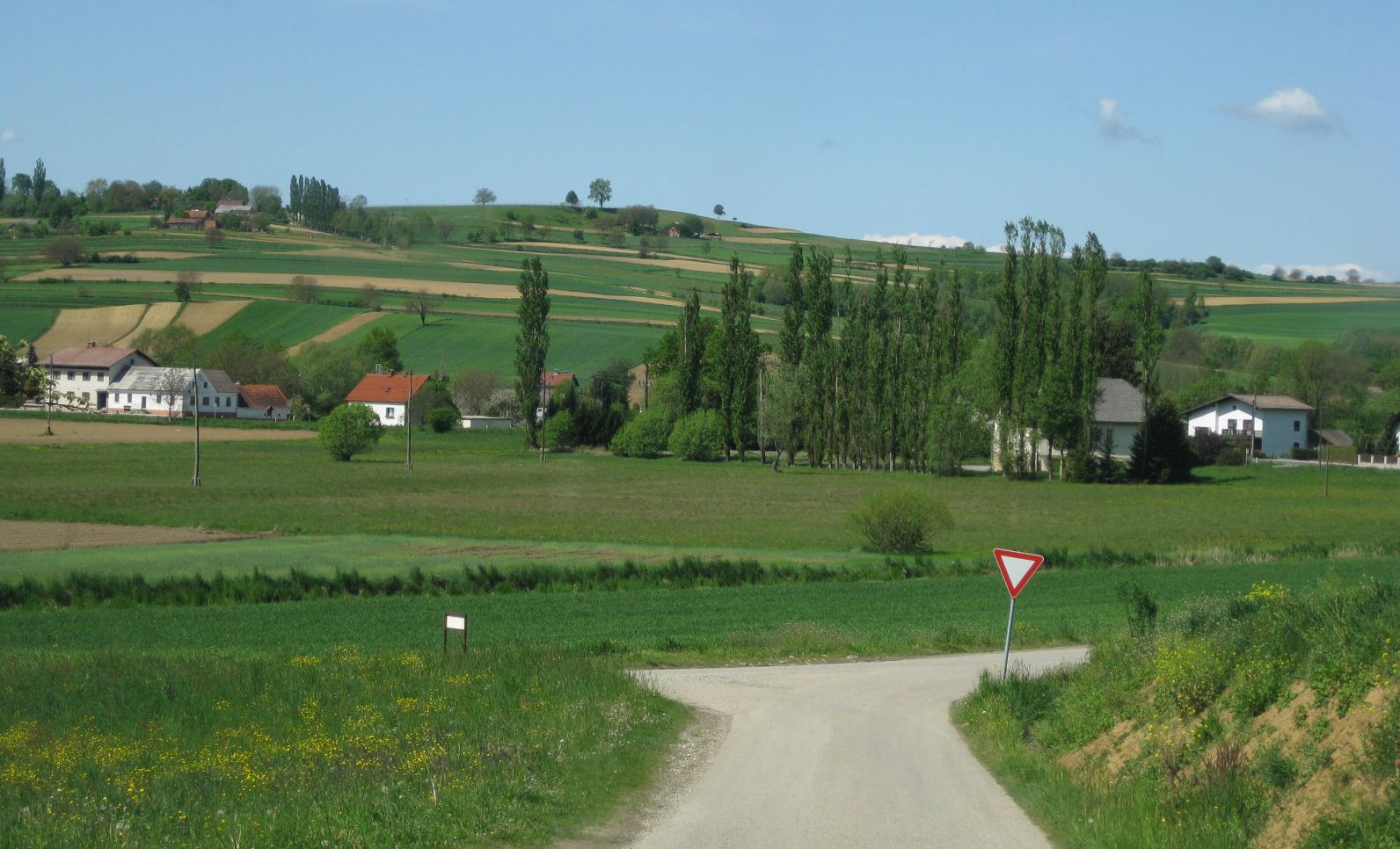

- Location in Slovenia
- Coordinates: 46°49′43.68″N 16°2′37.7″E
- Country: Slovenia
- Traditional region: Prekmurje
- Statistical region: Mura
- Municipality: Rogašovci

Area
  - Total: 4.36 km^{2} (1.68 sq mi)
- Elevation: 257.5 m (845 ft)

Population (2002)
  - Total: 394

Sotina (pronounced [ˈsoːtina]; Hungarian: Hegyszoros, German: Stadelberg) is a village in the Municipality of Rogašovci in the Prekmurje region of northeastern Slovenia. The village includes the following hamlets: Bezovkova Graba, Maribor (a small Roma settlement), Bracov Dol, Činčov Breg, Kolarova Graba, Majcov Mlin, Martinova Graba, Patrov Breg, Tomanov Breg, and Turzov Breg.
