= Rogašovci =

Rogašovci Rogačovci
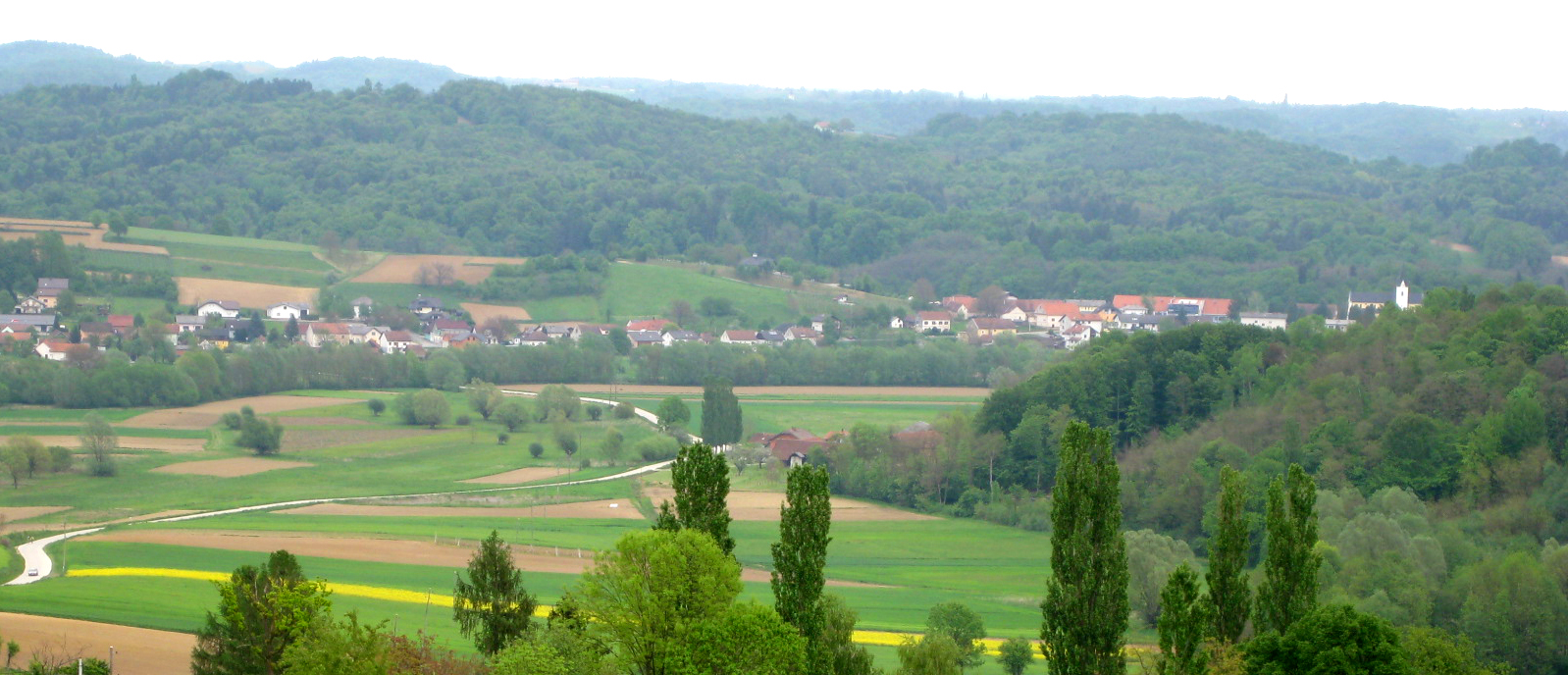

- Location in Slovenia
- Coordinates: 46°48′19.13″N 16°2′3.98″E
- Country: Slovenia
- Traditional region: Prekmurje
- Statistical region: Mura
- Municipality: Rogašovci

Area
  - Total: 2.95 km^{2} (1.14 sq mi)
- Elevation: 237.9 m (781 ft)

Population (2019)
  - Total: 2,946

Rogašovci (pronounced [ɾɔˈɡaːʃɔu̯tsi]; Prekmurje Slovene and in older sources: Rogačovci, Hungarian: Szarvaslak) is a settlement in Slovenia. It is the seat of the Municipality of Rogašovci. It is part of the Prekmurje region.

== Bibliography ==
- Jakopin, Franc (1985). Sluga, Meta (ed.). Slovenska krajevna imena. Ljubljana: Cankarjeva založba.
