= Serdica, Rogašovci =

Serdica
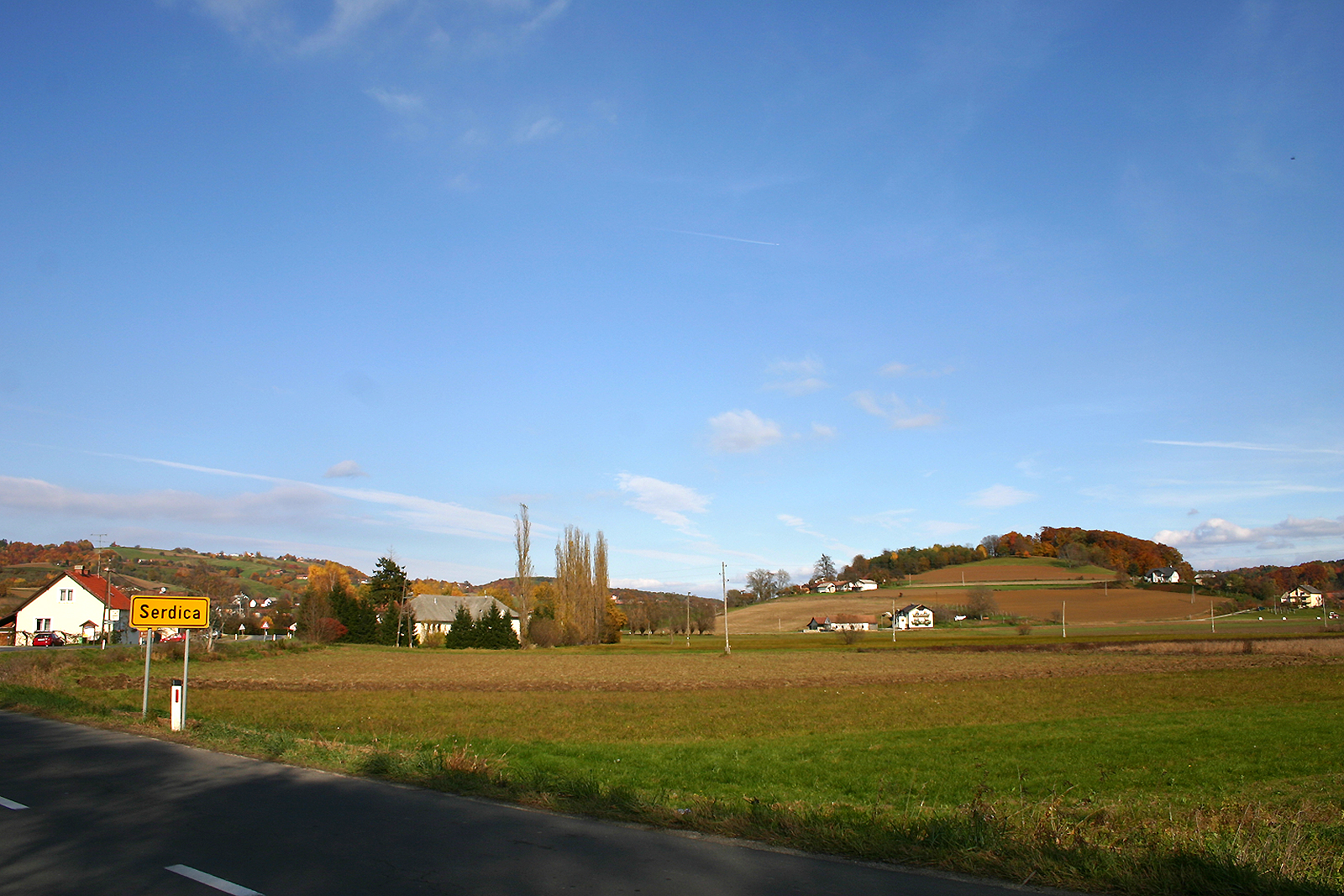

- Location in Slovenia
- Coordinates: 46°45′59.3″N 16°1′27.01″E
- Country: Slovenia
- Traditional region: Prekmurje
- Statistical region: Mura
- Municipality: Rogašovci

Area
  - Total: 4.99 km^{2} (1.93 sq mi)
- Elevation: 239.5 m (786 ft)

Population (2016)
  - Total: 556
  - Density: 110/km^{2} (280/sq mi)

Serdica (pronounced [sɛɾˈdiːtsa], in older sources also Srdica; Prekmurje Slovene: Srdica, Hungarian: Seregháza) is a village in the Municipality of Rogašovci in the Prekmurje region of northeastern Slovenia.
