= István Szijjártó =

Slovene Lutheran teacher and poet

István Szijjártó (Slovene: Števan Sijarto) (c. 1765 – 10 September 1833) was a Slovene Lutheran teacher and poet in Hungary.

He was born in Večeslavci (Prekmurje), near the Styrian border. His father was Iván Szijjártó, a Slovene peasant. Szijjártó studied in Nemescsó and in Sopron, at the Lutheran lyceum (?–1783). He taught in Križevci from 1787 to 1806 in Puconci. He later worked in Domanjševci, where he died.

In 1796, his hymnal Mrtvecsne Peszmi (Dirges) was published.

== Works ==
- Mrtvecsne Peszmi (Dirges), 1796
- Molitvi na sztári szlovenszki jezik obrnyene (Prayers Translated into Old Slovene), 1797
- Sztarisinsztvo, i zvacsinsztvo (Marriage and Wedding), 1807
- Sztarisinsztvo i zvacsinsztvo, 1852

== See also ==
- List of Slovene writers and poets in Hungary
