= Fikšinci =

Fikšinci Fükšinci
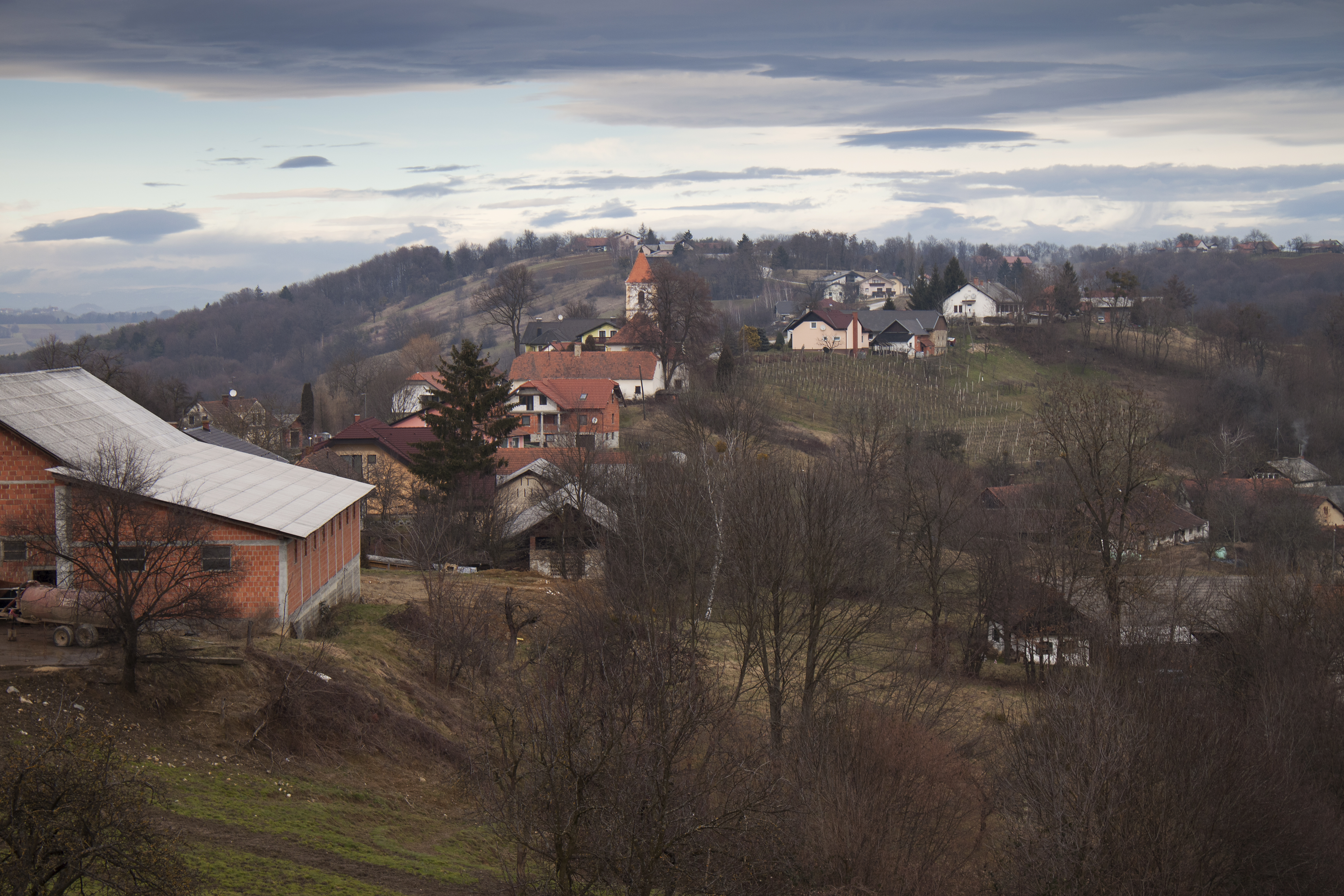

- Location in Slovenia
- Coordinates: 46°47′7.66″N 16°0′2.85″E
- Country: Slovenia
- Traditional region: Prekmurje
- Statistical region: Mura
- Municipality: Rogašovci

Area
  - Total: 3.02 km^{2} (1.17 sq mi)
- Elevation: 331.5 m (1,088 ft)

Population (2002)
  - Total: 184

Fikšinci (pronounced [ˈfiːkʃintsi]; in older sources also Fukšlinci, Hungarian: Kismáriahavas, German: Fükselsdorf, Prekmurje Slovene: Fükšinci) is a village in the Municipality of Rogašovci in the Prekmurje region of northeastern Slovenia.

The local church in the centre of the village is dedicated to Our Lady of the Snows. It is a simple single-nave building with a polygonal apse and a belfry, built in 1850.
