= Kramarovci =

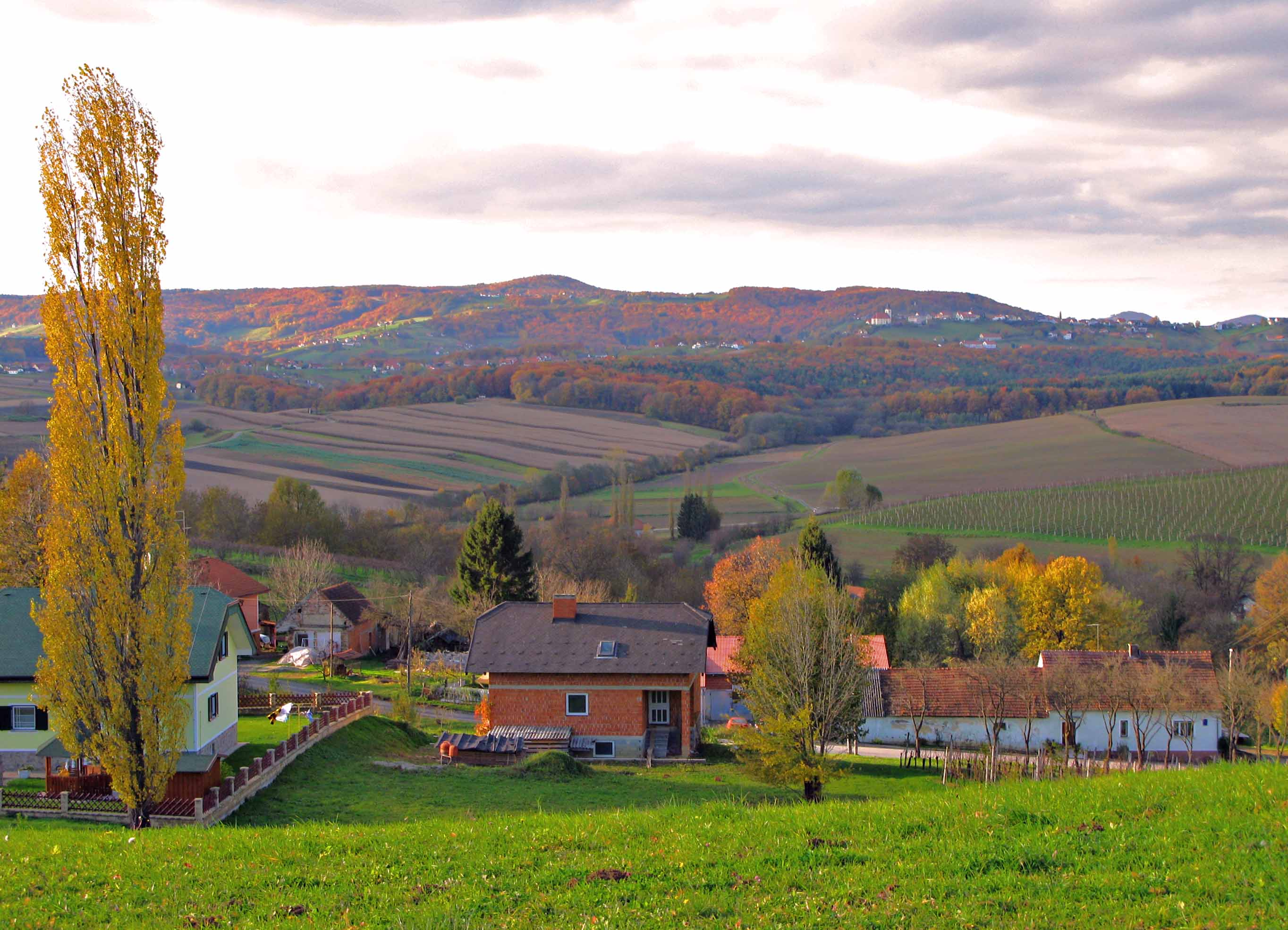

- Location in Slovenia
- Coordinates: 46°48′34.43″N 16°0′5.88″E
- Country: Slovenia
- Traditional region: Prekmurje
- Statistical region: Mura
- Municipality: Rogašovci

Area
  - Total: 1.94 km^{2} (0.75 sq mi)
- Elevation: 277.6 m (911 ft)

Population (2002)
  - Total: 60

Kramarovci (pronounced [ˈkɾaːmaɾɔu̯tsi]; Hungarian: Határfalva, German: Sinnersdorf) is a small village in the Municipality of Rogašovci in the Prekmurje region of northeastern Slovenia, right on the border with Austria.

There is a small chapel in the centre of the settlement. It was built in the early 20th century and has a belfry attached to it. Until 1945 the village had a German majority.
