= Nagykarácsony =

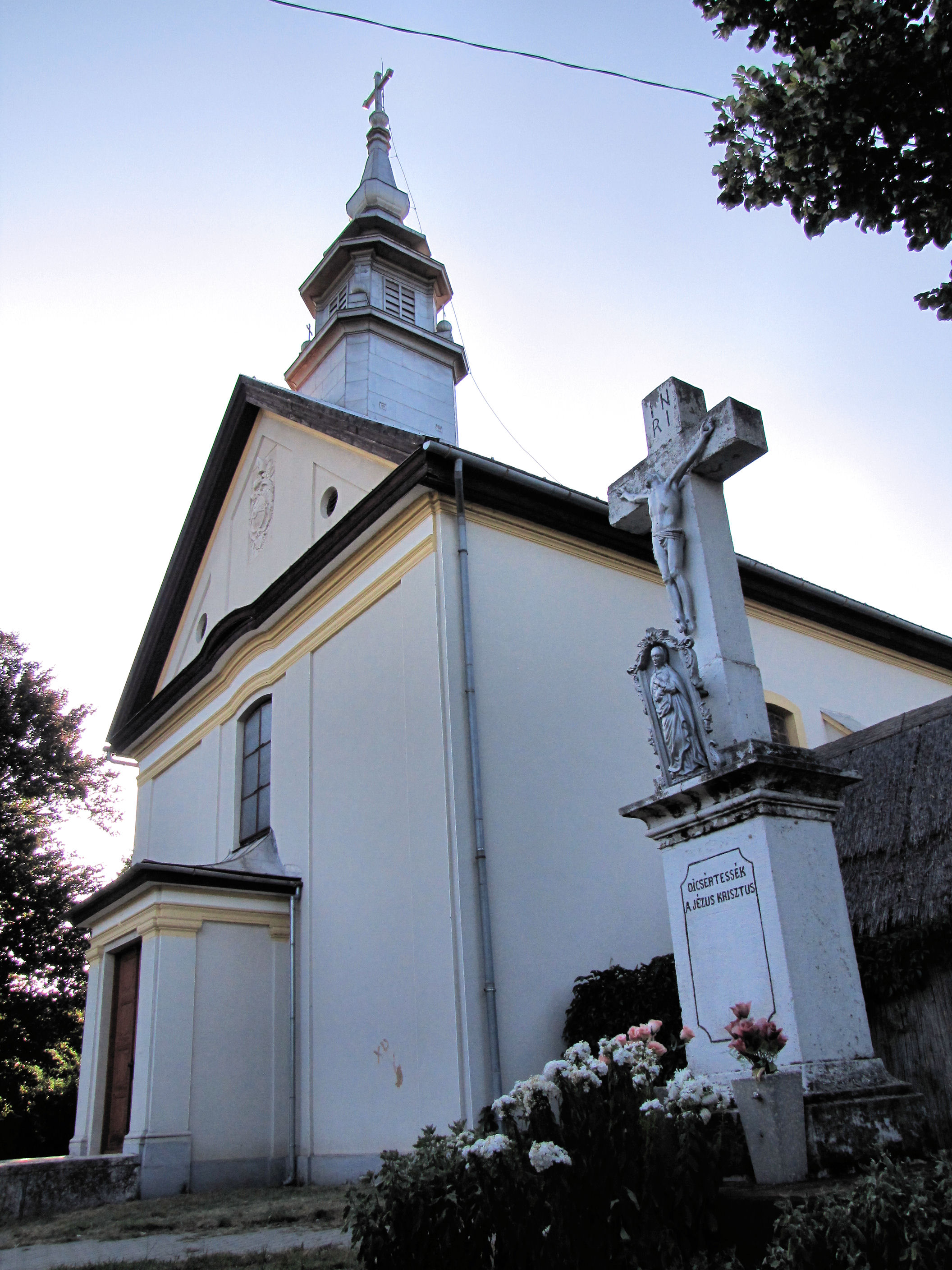
- Roman Catholic church

- Coat of arms

- Location of Nagykarácsony in Hungary
- Coordinates: 46.87°N 18.77°E
- Country: Hungary
- Region: Central Transdanubia
- County: Fejér

Area
  - Total: 30.46 km^{2} (11.76 sq mi)

Population (2012)
  - Total: 1,361
  - Density: 44.68/km^{2} (115.7/sq mi)
- Time zone: UTC+1 (CET)
  - Summer (DST): UTC+2 (CEST)
- Postal code: 2425
- Area code: +36 25
- Website: https://nagykaracsony.hu/

Nagykarácsony is a village in Fejér county, Hungary.
