= Ocinje =

Ocinje Oucinje
- Location in Slovenia
- Coordinates: 46°49′23.92″N 16°0′12.93″E
- Country: Slovenia
- Traditional region: Prekmurje
- Statistical region: Mura
- Municipality: Rogašovci

Area
  - Total: 2.95 km^{2} (1.14 sq mi)
- Elevation: 292 m (958 ft)

Population (2002)
  - Total: 60

Ocinje (pronounced [ˈoːtsinjɛ]; in older sources also Ocinja, Hungarian: Gedőudvar, German: Guzenhof or Guitzendorf, Prekmurje Slovene: Oucinje) is a small village in the Municipality of Rogašovci in the Prekmurje region of northeastern Slovenia, right on the border with Austria.

== History ==
In 1941 the village was ceded to Germany due its purely German inhabitants. The population of Ocinje was expelled in 1945 and replaced by Slovenians.
