= Pertoča =

- Location in Slovenia
- Coordinates: 46°46′29.66″N 16°2′39.59″E
- Country: Slovenia
- Traditional region: Prekmurje
- Statistical region: Mura
- Municipality: Rogašovci

Area
  - Total: 4.73 km^{2} (1.83 sq mi)
- Elevation: 227.7 m (747 ft)

Population (2002)
  - Total: 479

Pertoča (pronounced [ˈpɛːɾtɔtʃa]; in older sources also Prtoča, Hungarian: Perestó, German: St. Helena) is a village in the Municipality of Rogašovci in the Prekmurje region of northeastern Slovenia.

The parish church in the village is dedicated to Saint Helena. It belongs to the Roman Catholic Diocese of Murska Sobota. It was originally a Gothic building dating to the 16th century. In the 1960s the original church was demolished and rebuilt in a modern style.
