= Ferfolja =

Ferfolja is a surname. Notable people with the surname include:

- Josip Ferfolja (1880–1958), Slovene lawyer and politician
- Teja Ferfolja (born 1991), Slovene handball player
