= Mački, Velike Lašče =

Mački
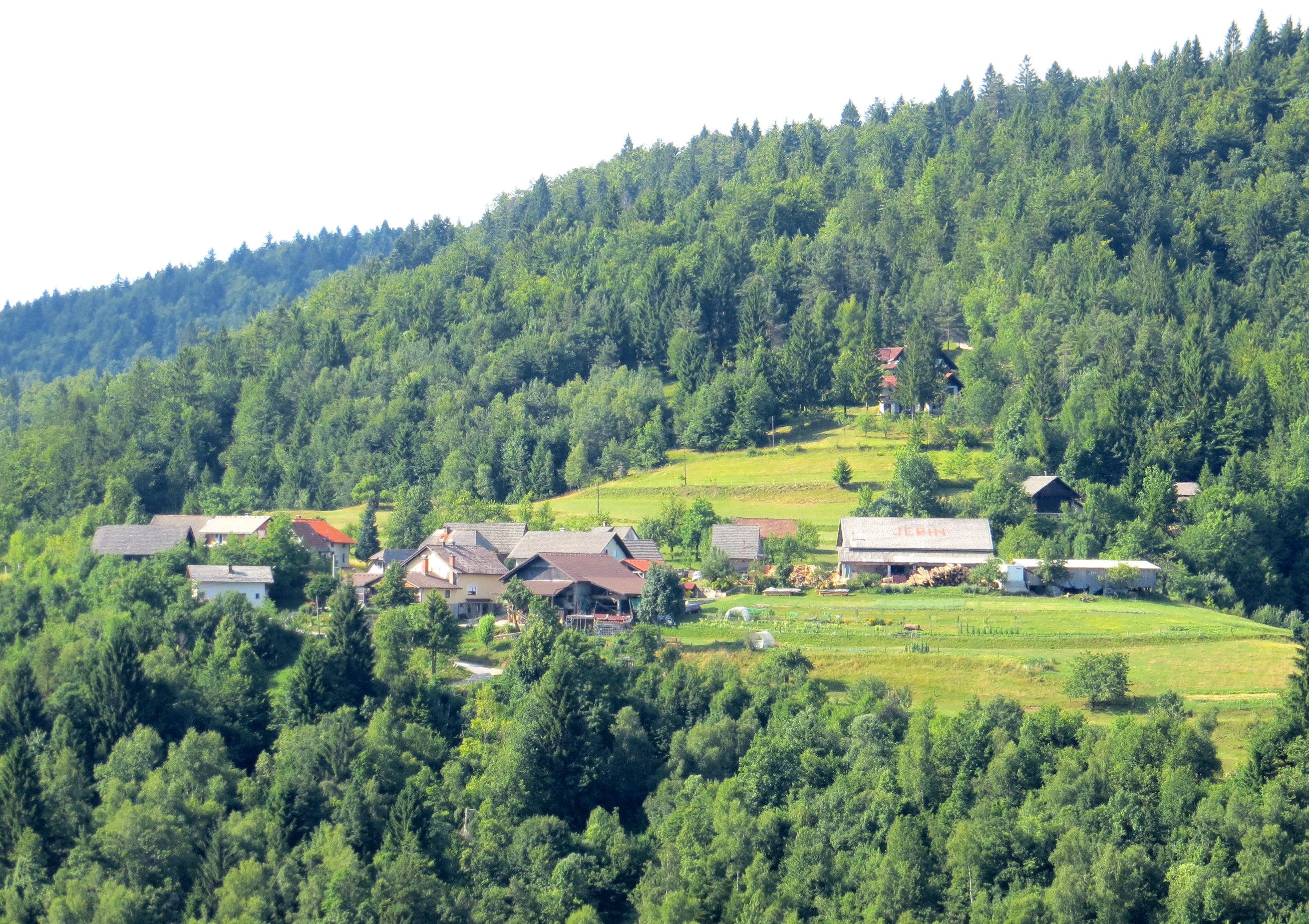

- Location in Slovenia
- Coordinates: 45°50′54.81″N 14°32′37.69″E
- Country: Slovenia
- Traditional region: Lower Carniola
- Statistical region: Central Slovenia
- Municipality: Velike Lašče

Area
  - Total: 0.76 km^{2} (0.29 sq mi)
- Elevation: 698.2 m (2,291 ft)

Population (2002)
  - Total: 26
- Postal code: 1314

Mački (pronounced [ˈmaːtʃki]; in older sources also Mačke) is a small clustered settlement west of Velike Lašče in central Slovenia. The entire Municipality of Velike Lašče is part of the traditional region of Lower Carniola and is now included in the Central Slovenia Statistical Region.

== Geography ==
Mački stands on the northern slope of Strojan Hill (Slovene: Strojanski hrib), which is the eastern part of Mačkovec Hill (911 m). The village is accessible by the road from Rob to Krvava Peč. The soil in the area is thin, loamy, and sandy, and there is little arable land.

== Name ==
The collective (plural) name of the settlement indicates that it may have developed from a single farm. Although the name Mački literally means 'cats', the name of the village and others like it (e.g., Mačkovec, Mačkovci) is likely not directly named for animals, but via the nickname Maček (literally, 'cat'), which is still found as a surname in Slovenia and likely refers to an early inhabitant of the place.

== History ==
In the past, because of limited agricultural opportunities, the economy of the village was linked to the production of bushel baskets, wooden spoons, and toothpicks, as well as the sale of wood and gathering mushrooms.

During the Second World War, several houses in the village were burned. On 8 May 1944 the Home Guard unexpectedly attacked the Velike Lašče command post in Mački. Twelve Partisan soldiers and the commandant of the post, Viktor Kraševec (or Krašovec; born 1904), were killed in the attack. Those killed included four Liberation Front activists from the village of Mački itself. On 4 July 1964 a memorial plaque was placed on the Sterle house (or Tinček house) at Mački no. 6, the site of the post headquarters, to commemorate the event.
