= List of Slovenian missionaries =

This is a list of notable missionaries from Slovenia:\

== B ==
- Frederic Baraga (1797–1868; United States)

== H ==
- Ferdinand Augustin Hallerstein (1703–1774; China)
- Antonija Höffern (1803–1871; United States)

== K ==
- Jožef Kerec (1892–1974; Malaysia, Makao, Hongkong, China)
- Ignatius Knoblecher (1819–1858; Egypt, Sudan)

== M ==
- Ignatius Mrak (1818–1901; U.S.)

== O ==
- Pedro Opeka (born 1948)

== P ==
- Francis Xavier Pierz (1785–1880; U.S.)
