= János Fliszár =

Hungarian Slovenian translator, poet, writer, journalist and teacher

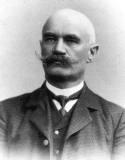
János Fliszár

János Fliszár (Slovene: Janoš Flisar; June 21, 1856 – June 21, 1947) was a Hungarian Slovenian translator, poet, writer, journalist, and teacher.

He was born in the village of Šalamenci in the Prekmurje region of the Kingdom of Hungary; his parents were Miklós Fliszár and Ilona Zsibrik. He enrolled in the elementary school in Puconci in 1862, and later studied in Nemescsó near Kőszeg. Until 1868 he studied at the Lutheran Lyceum in Sopron, graduating in June 1875. In October the same year he started working as teacher in Križevci. There he was married to the daughter of the writer János Berke in 1878 (she died in 1905).

In 1911 he retired and worked in Murska Sobota. Until 1923 he worked as the director of the Murska Sobota dormitory.

Fliszár wrote some poetry and translated the Hungarian literature (by János Arany, Kálmán Mikszáth, Sándor Petőfi, Mór Jókai, etc.). His translations were published in the United States, in the newspaper Amerikanszki Szlovencov glász, published by the Hungarian Slovenian and Prekmurje immigrants to the United States.

After World War I, Fliszár lived in Yugoslavia and supported radical Hungarian irredentism. His Magyar-vend szótár (Hungarian-Slovene Dictionary) contains 50,000 words.

== See also ==
- List of Slovene writers and poets in Hungary
