= Vaneča =

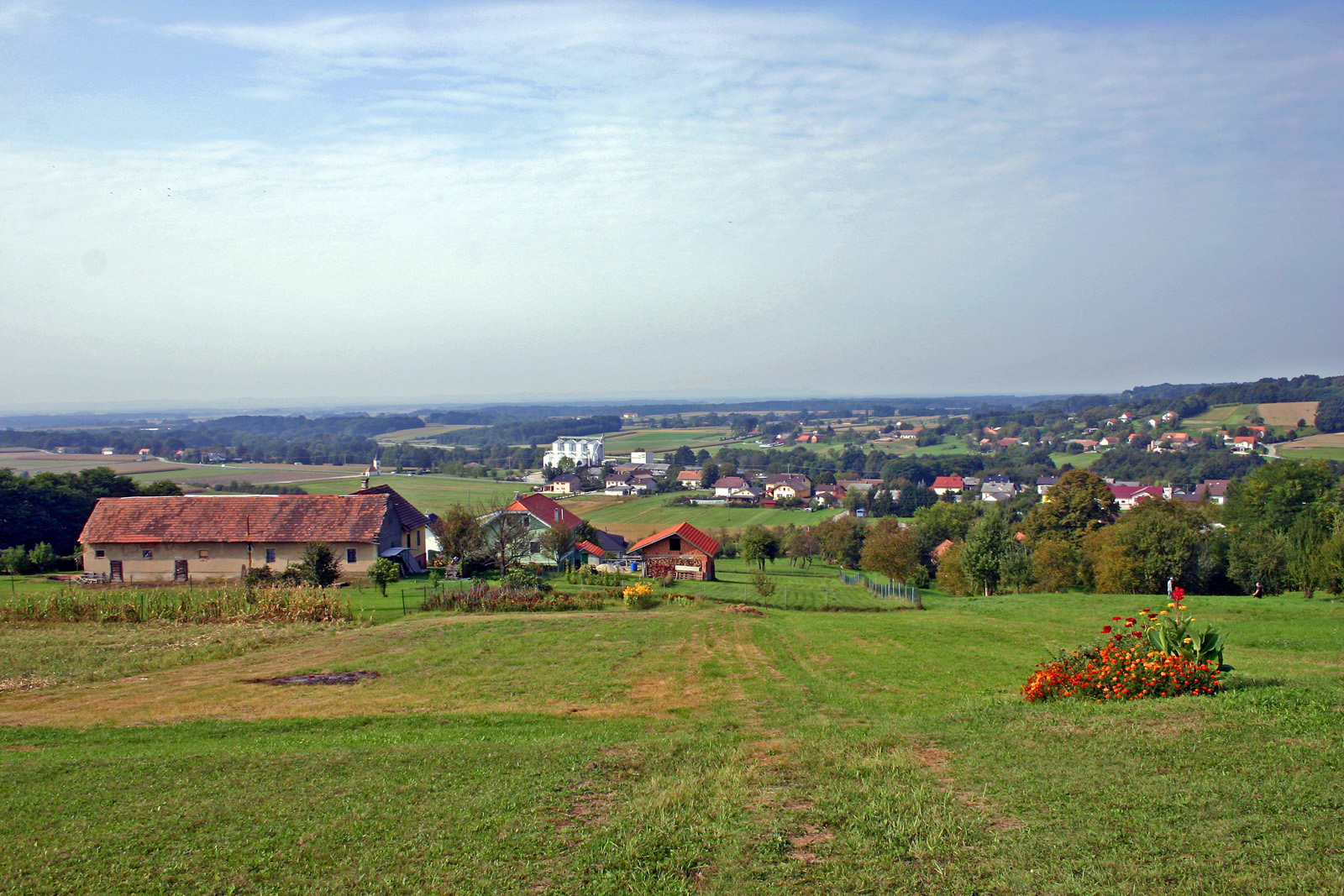

- Location in Slovenia
- Coordinates: 46°43′37.86″N 16°9′36.87″E
- Country: Slovenia
- Traditional region: Prekmurje
- Statistical region: Mura
- Municipality: Puconci

Area
  - Total: 5.94 km^{2} (2.29 sq mi)
- Elevation: 236.1 m (775 ft)

Population (2002)
  - Total: 410

Vaneča (pronounced [ˈʋaːnɛtʃa]; Hungarian: Vaslak) is a settlement north of Puconci in the Prekmurje region of Slovenia.

There is a small neoromanesque chapel in the settlement. It was built in the early 20th century and has a three-story belfry with arched windows on all sides.

== Notable people ==
Notable people that were born or lived in Vaneča include:

- Mihály Szever Vanecsai (ca. 1699–1750), writer
