= Ferenc Berke =

Hungarian Slovene Lutheran pastor and writer

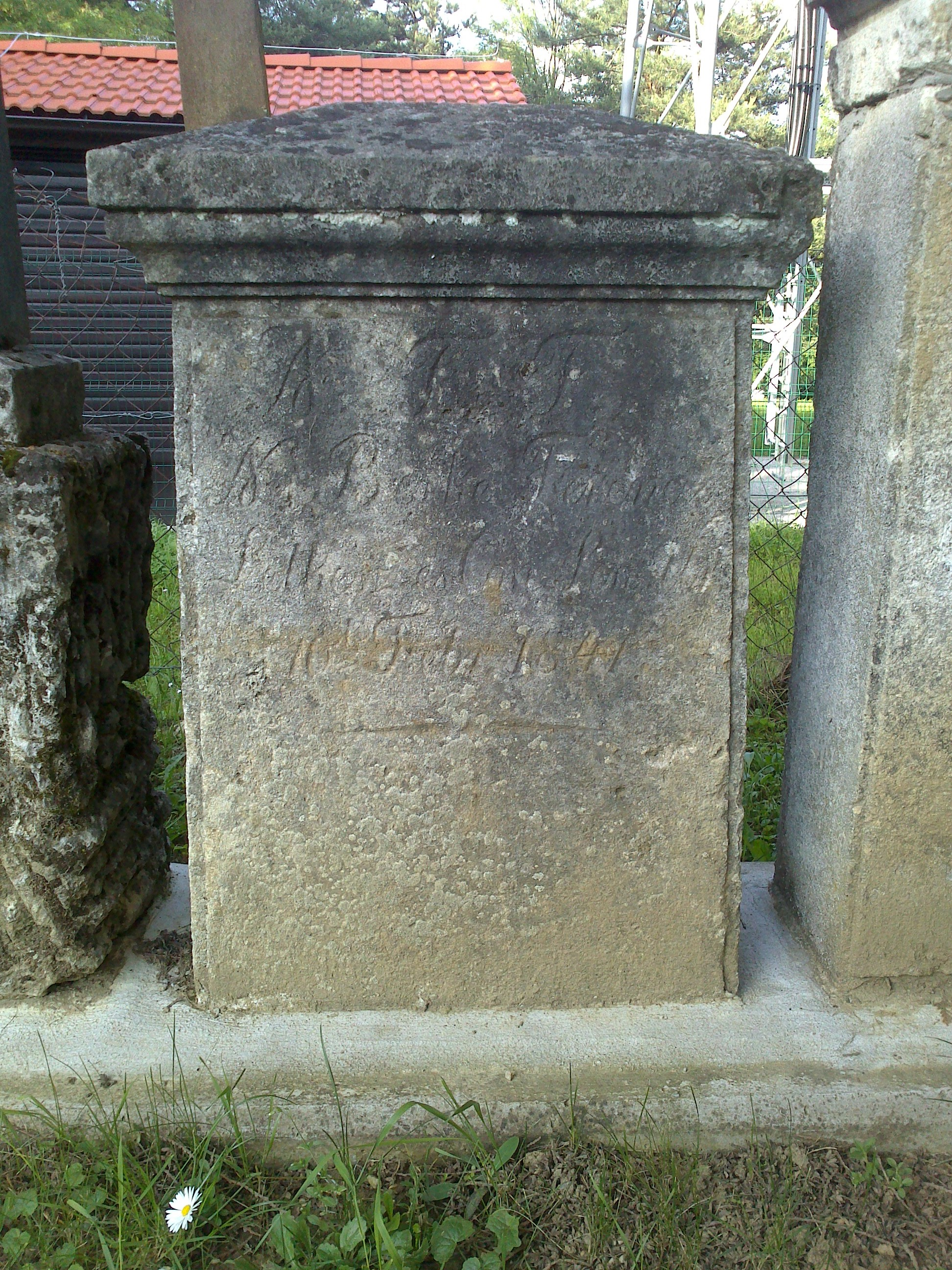
Berke's gravestone in Puconci

Ferenc Xaver Berke de Nagybarkóc (Slovene: Franc Berke; Prekmurje Slovene: Ferenc Xaver Berke; c. 1764 – 10 February 1841) was a Hungarian Slovene Lutheran pastor and writer.

== Life ==
Born in Sembiborci (Sebeborci), he was the son of János Berke (1734–1820) and Judita Novák (daughter of the nobleman Ferenc Novák). His parents belonged to the petty nobility (gentry). One of his ancestors, Ambrosius Berke, received confirmation of his earlier nobility and privileges in 1609, after older documents had been lost in the war with the Ottomans.

Berke attended elementary school in Nemescsó, and by 1778 was at the Lutheran lyceum in Pozsony. He then studied for three years at the University of Jena in Germany. He married twice, first to the noblewoman Elisabeth Posgay, widow of János Ringhoffer, and after her death to Anna Zsuzsanna Bachich, widow of the nobleman Péter Horváth, the Lutheran pastor in Meszlen. Bachich's father was István Bachich, the senior (superintendent) of the Lutheran congregation in Sopron. Neither of the two marriages produced children. Berke's younger brother József Berke (1772–1833) was the pastor in Križevci, Croatia from 1805 to 1833.

After 1790, Berke was the pastor in Križevci until October 14, 1805, when he became the pastor in Puconci and later the senior (superintendent) of the Lutheran congregation. Berke and Mátyás Godina published a second edition of the Prekmurje-dialect Nouvi Zákon (New Testament) ny István Küzmics. In 1829, sanction to the György Czipott's prayer-book Dühovni áldov.

== See also ==
- List of Slovene writers and poets in Hungary
- Prekmurje

== Literature ==
- Vili Kerčmar: Evangeličanska cerkev na Slovenskem, Murska Sobota 1995.
