= Števan Smodiš =

Slovene Lutheran priest and writer

Števan (Štefan) Smodiš (Hungarian: István Szmodis, born 1758) was a Slovene Lutheran priest and writer.

He was born in Liszó, Somogy (today Zala county). His parents had migrated from the Slovene March (Slovenska okroglina, today Prekmurje). He worked as a teacher in Nemescsó. His ordination as a curate was on March 24, 1787, in Puconci and by 1792 he was working in Hodoš.

On July 25, 1792, he arrived in Bodonci. The date of his death is unknown or uncertain. He wrote hymns and a sermon in the Prekmurje Slovene.

== Literature ==
- Evangeličanska cerkvena občina Bodonci
- Vili Kerčmar: Evangeličanska cerkev na Slovenskem, Murska Sobota 1995.

== See also ==
- List of Slovene writers and poets in Hungary
