= Gorica, Puconci =

Gorica
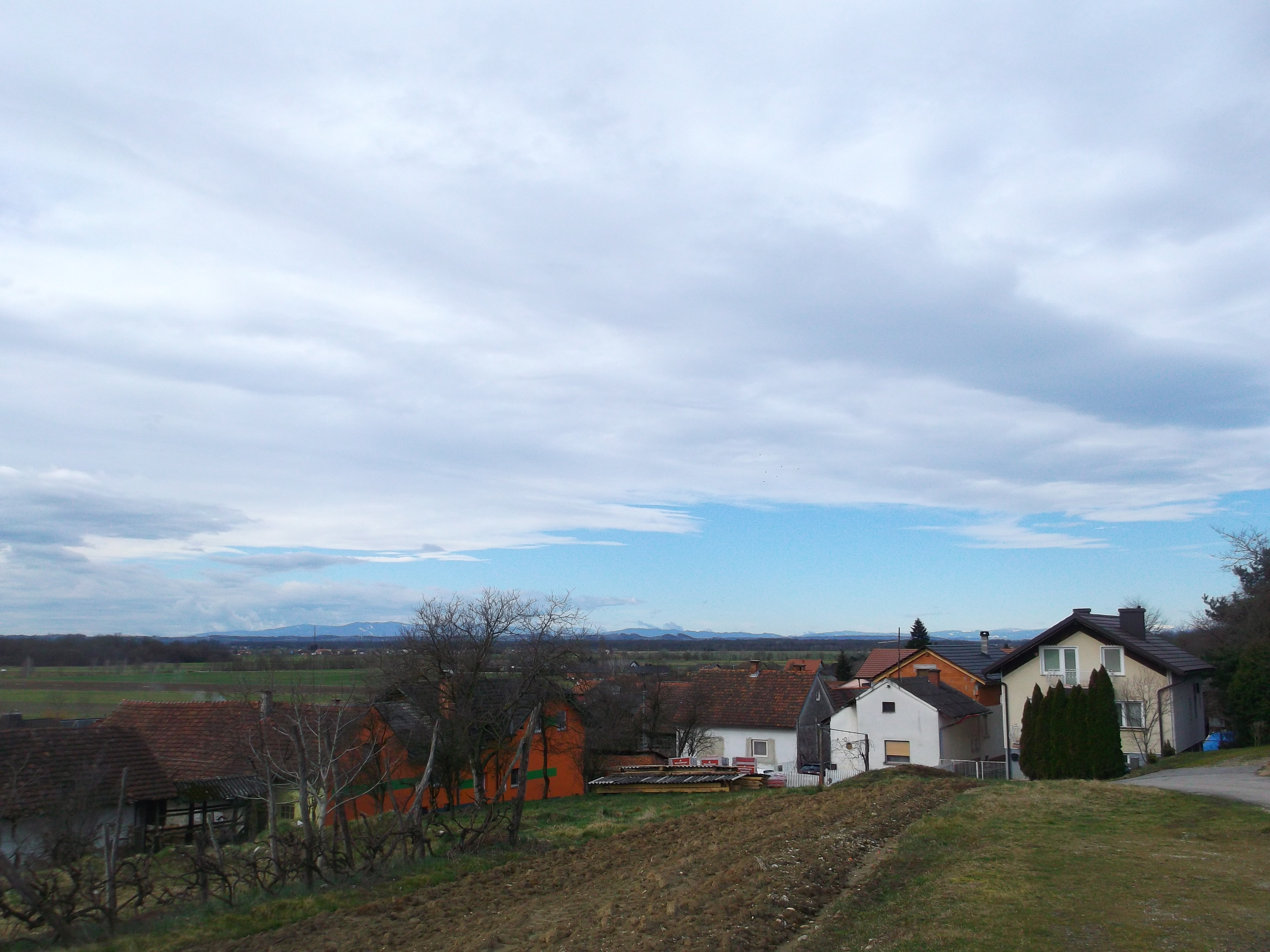

- Location in Slovenia
- Coordinates: 46°42′7.94″N 16°8′53.52″E
- Country: Slovenia
- Traditional region: Prekmurje
- Statistical region: Mura
- Municipality: Puconci

Area
  - Total: 3.7 km^{2} (1.4 sq mi)
- Elevation: 201.9 m (662 ft)

Population (2002)
  - Total: 326

Gorica (pronounced [ˈɡoːɾitsa]; Hungarian: Halmosfő) is a small roadside village in the Municipality of Puconci in the Prekmurje region of Slovenia.

== Location ==
Gorica is located only 6 km north of Murska Sobota, the main town in the Prekmurje region. The main part of the settlement of Gorica developed along main road from Puconci to Brezovci. At the crossroads in the centre of the village, a secondary road leads southwards to Polana. There is a second crossroad at the western end of the village with road towards the hamlet of the settlement known as Gornja Gorica (Upper Gorica) and the village of Šalamenci turning towards the north. There is a natural spring in the middle of the village. Known locally by the Slovene word for spring, Izvir, it was particularly important before a water supply network was built in the village in 1968. The spring with the concrete water cistern built around it, is considered a landmark and is valued by the local people. The local mini football team is named KMN Izvir Gorica after it.

== Village activities ==
=== Farming ===
Local people mostly work in agriculture. There is a variety of soils around the village with a mixture of clay and sandy soils towards hills to the north of the settlement and lime-rich marlstone mixed with sandy soils in the flatlands to the south. Crops cultivated in the area include wheat, barley, hybrid corn, fodder plants, rye, and sugar beets. Potatoes for domestic use, as well as pumpkins, from which locals extract pumpkin seed oil, are also grown in the fields and fruit trees are maintained in gardens in the village.

=== Social activities ===
The village fire station doubles as a village hall. It was built in 1957 and includes a conference room as well as a small auditorium with a stage.

Wildlife in the rich hunting grounds around the village is managed by the Dolina Hunters' Association (Lovska Družina Dolina) from Puconci.

A women's association, a mini football club, and a voluntary firemen's association are active in the village.

The Štrk Powered Paragliding Club from Murska Sobota also maintains a launch and landing strip with a small hangar in Gorica.

== Village history ==
The earliest mention of Gorica as Guricha in surviving written documents is in the Diplomataria dating to 1365, preserved in the National Archives of Hungary. In 1366 it appears as Goricha in dystrict Sancti Martini. In 1499 it is spelled Gorycza. Sources from 1698 give the population of Goricza as 70.

Today there are many religions represented in the village – Lutheranism, Catholicism, and Pentecostalism. Locals of various religious persuasions are well integrated, and even share a common local cemetery.

The modern history of Gorica is similar to that of all neighboring villages. With the rest of Prekmurje, it was part of the Kingdom of Hungary until 1918 and was included in the Kingdom of Yugoslavia after that. Horthy's Hungary occupied the area during the Second World War from 1941 to 1944 and Nazi Germany between 1944 and 1945. It was liberated by Soviet troops in May 1945 and Soviet troops were stationed in practically every house in the village. After the Second World War the village with the surrounding infrastructure slowly started to develop. Much was achieved by the villagers themselves through volunteering for the construction of the fire station and village hall and in the asphalting of the main road.

== Notable locals ==
The village is especially proud of Karel Flisar (1912–1983), born in the village, who worked as a fireman all over the Prekmurje area. He also worked at the Firemen's Association of Slovenia (Gasilska Zveza Slovenije), where he was a leading member. In the period immediately after the Second World War he was the initiator of the restoration of numerous local fire stations and their equipment as well as the education and training of firemen. A commemorative plaque to him was unveiled at the local fire station in 2005 and a competition between local fire brigades is organised in the village in his memory every four years, known as the Karl Flisar Memorial (Gasilski memorial Karla Flisarja).

== Other sources ==
Krajevni leksikon Slovenije 1980, vol. 4

Ivan Zelko:Zgodovina Prekmurja

Arhiv RS

Geodetski zavod RS

Kronologija vasi Gorica

== Gallery ==
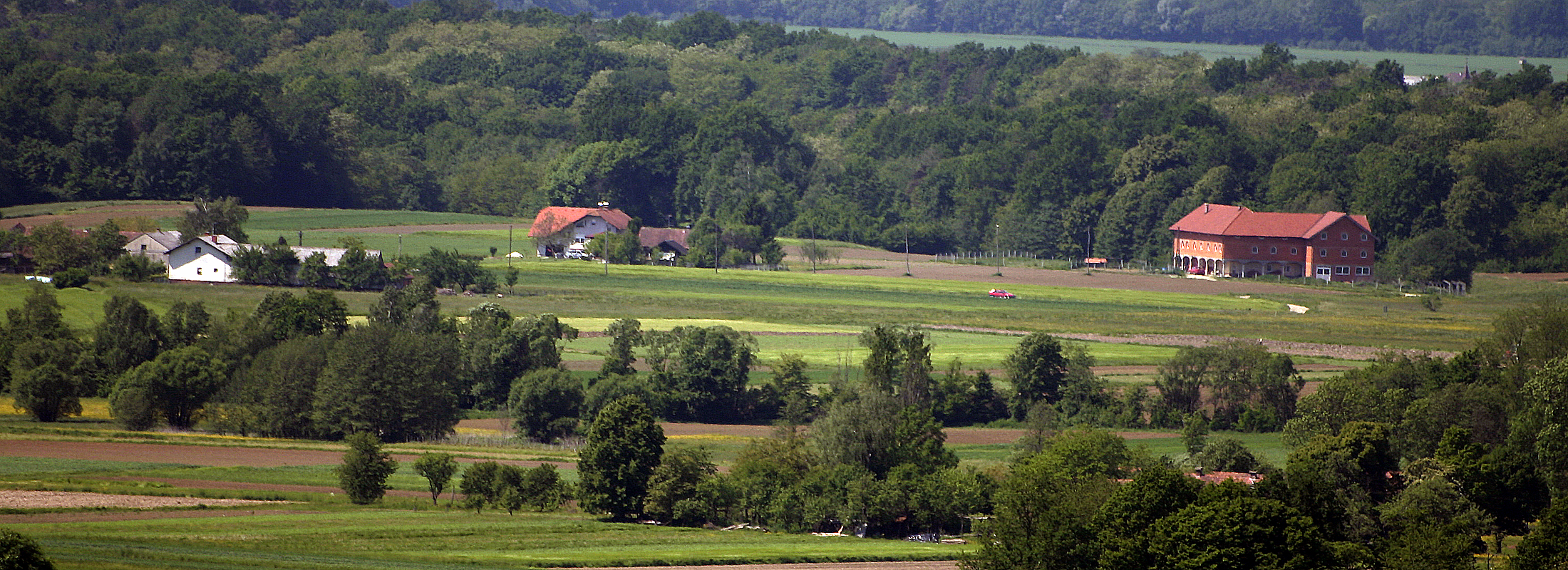
Gornja Gorica (Upper Gorica)

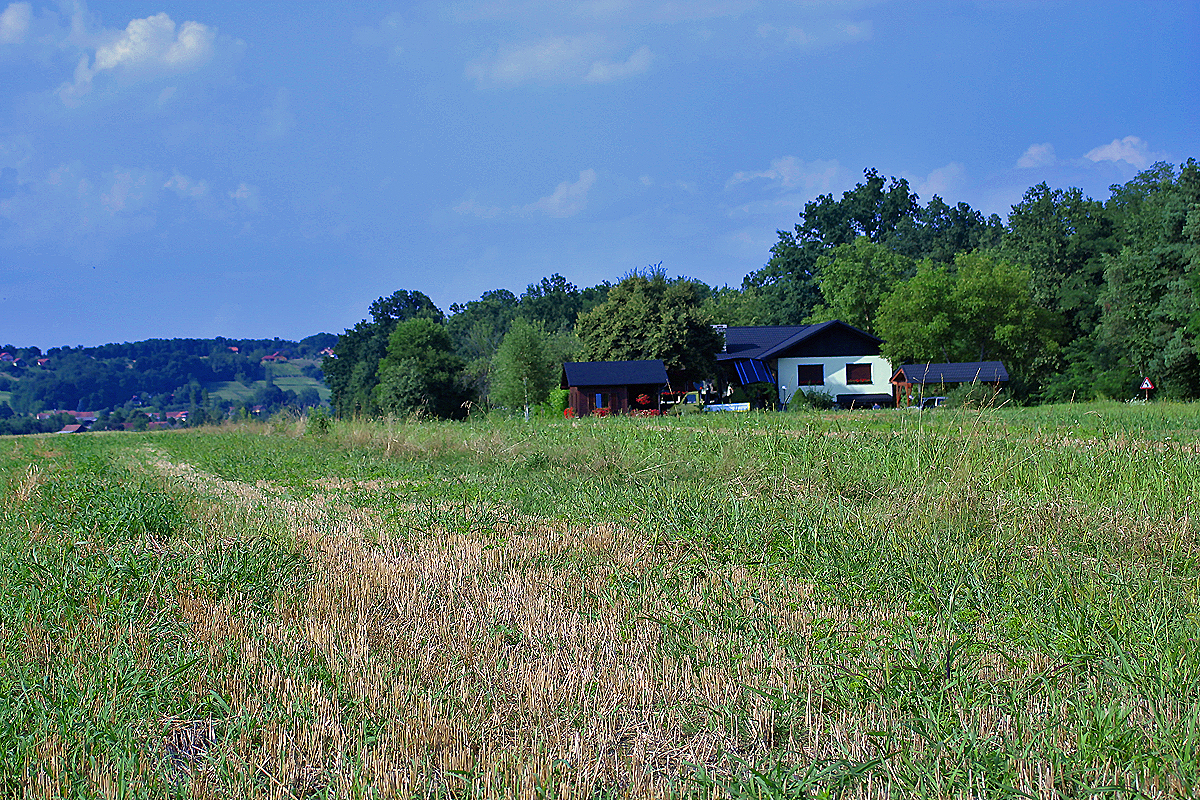
Gorica Lang

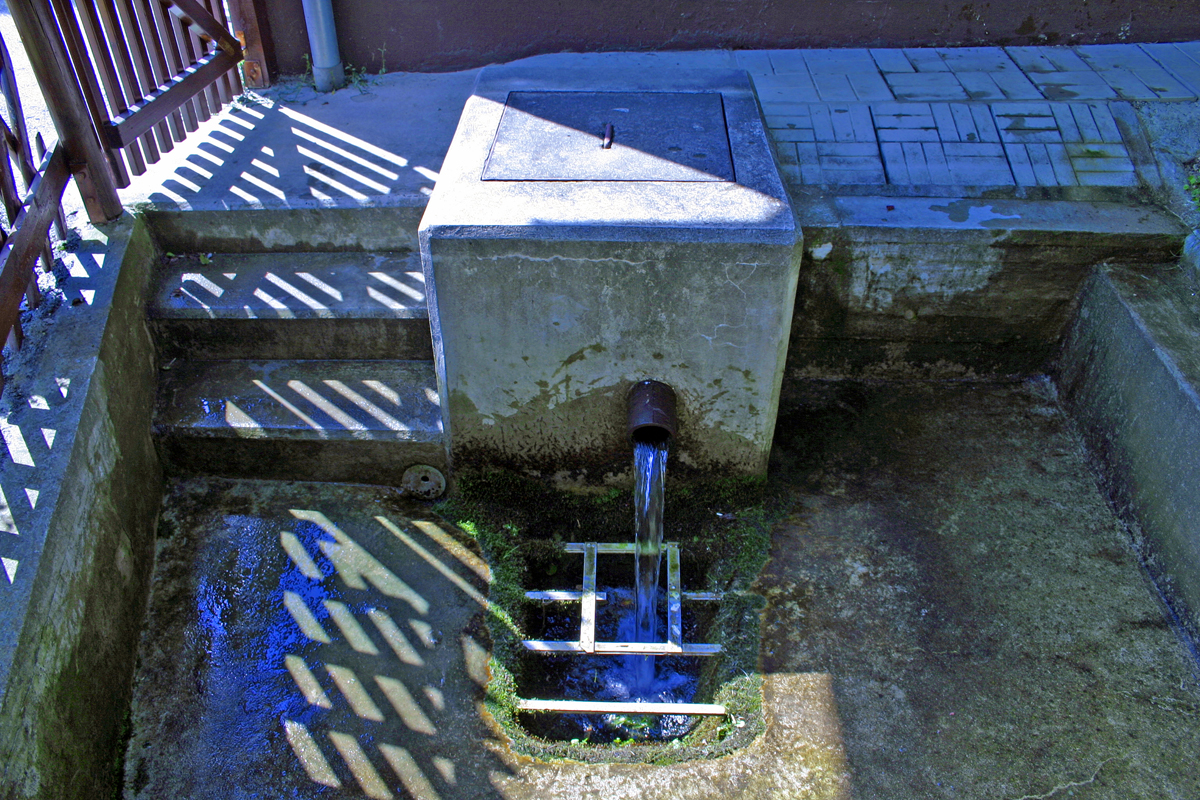
Spring

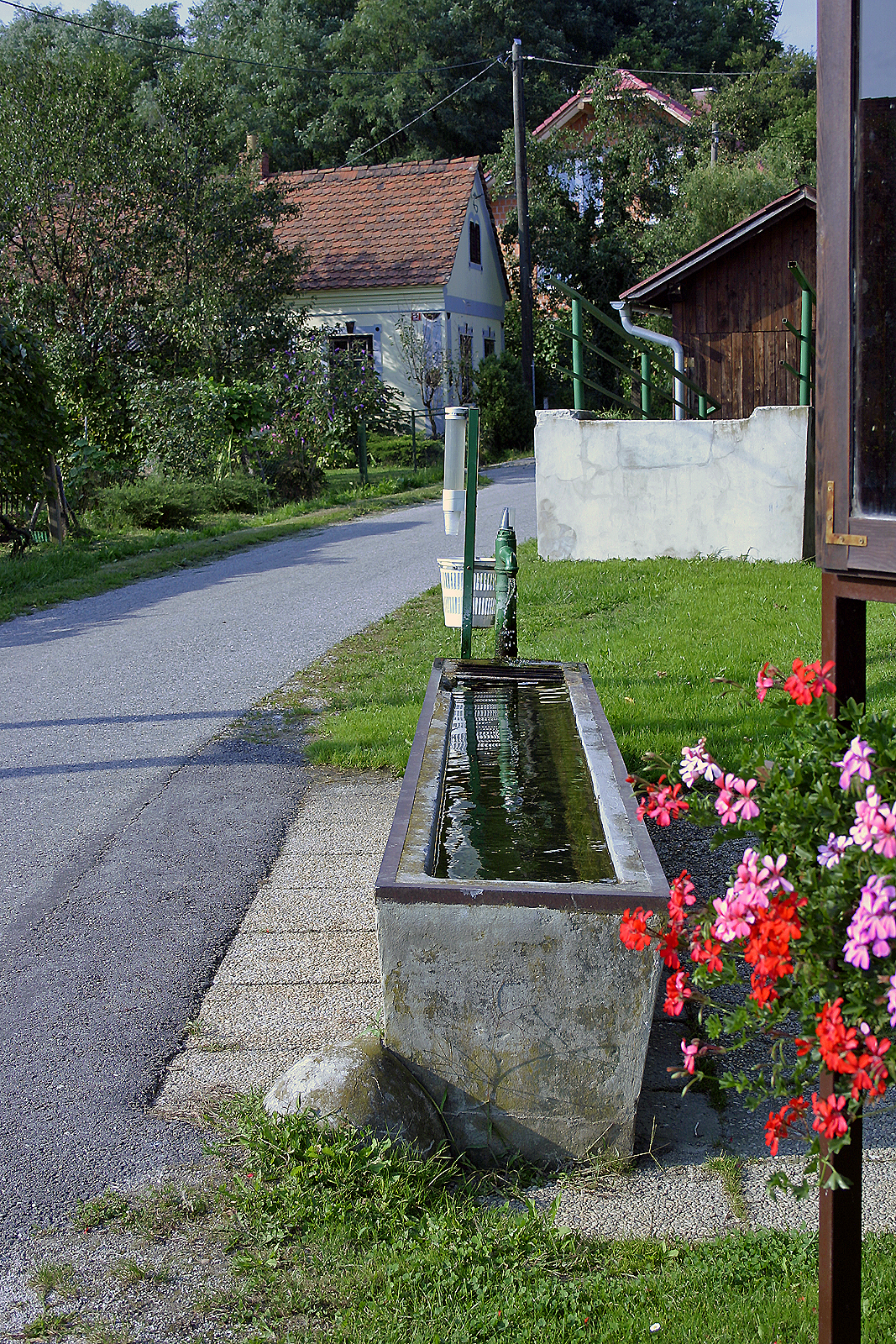
Koponja (Cattle were once watered here.)

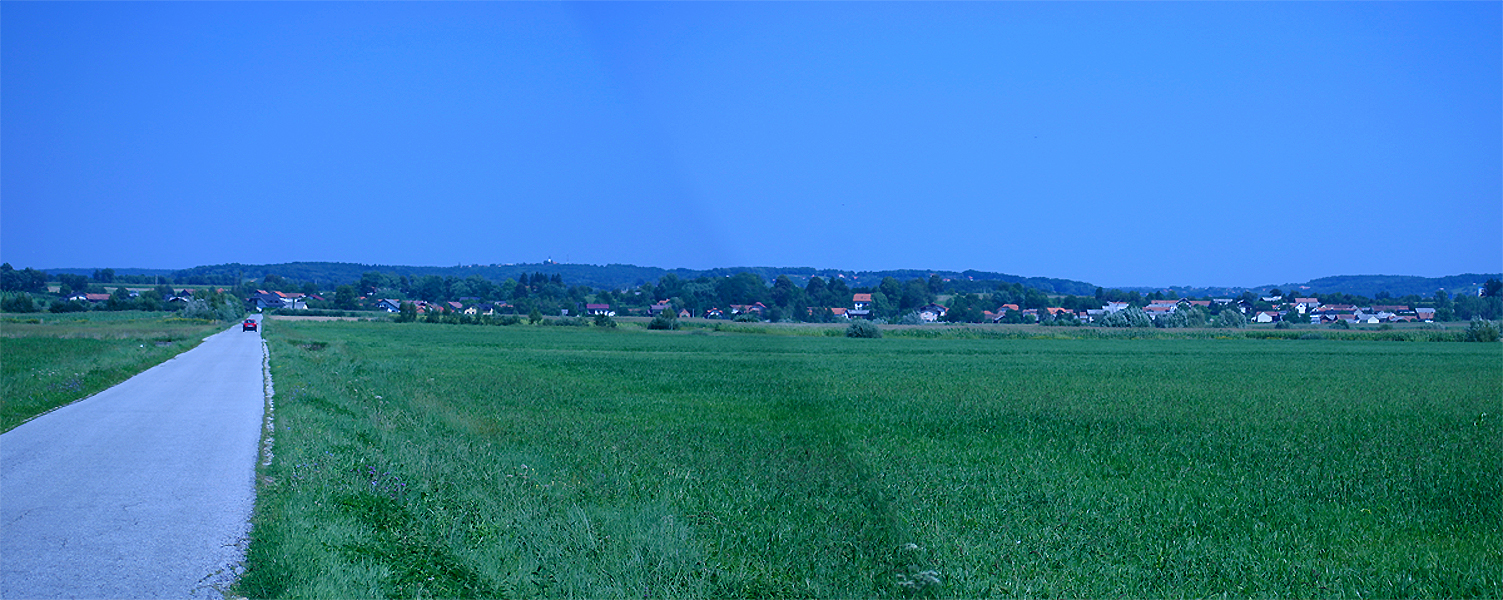
Panorama

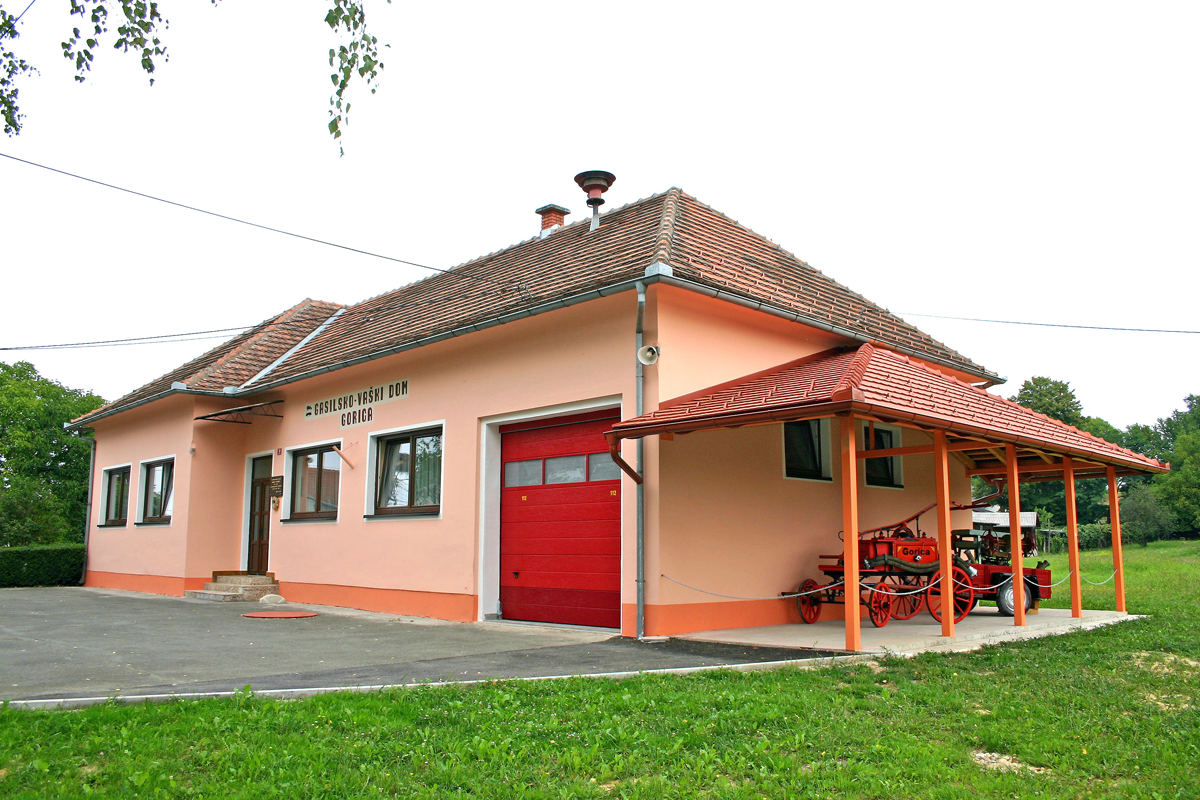
Gorica fire station

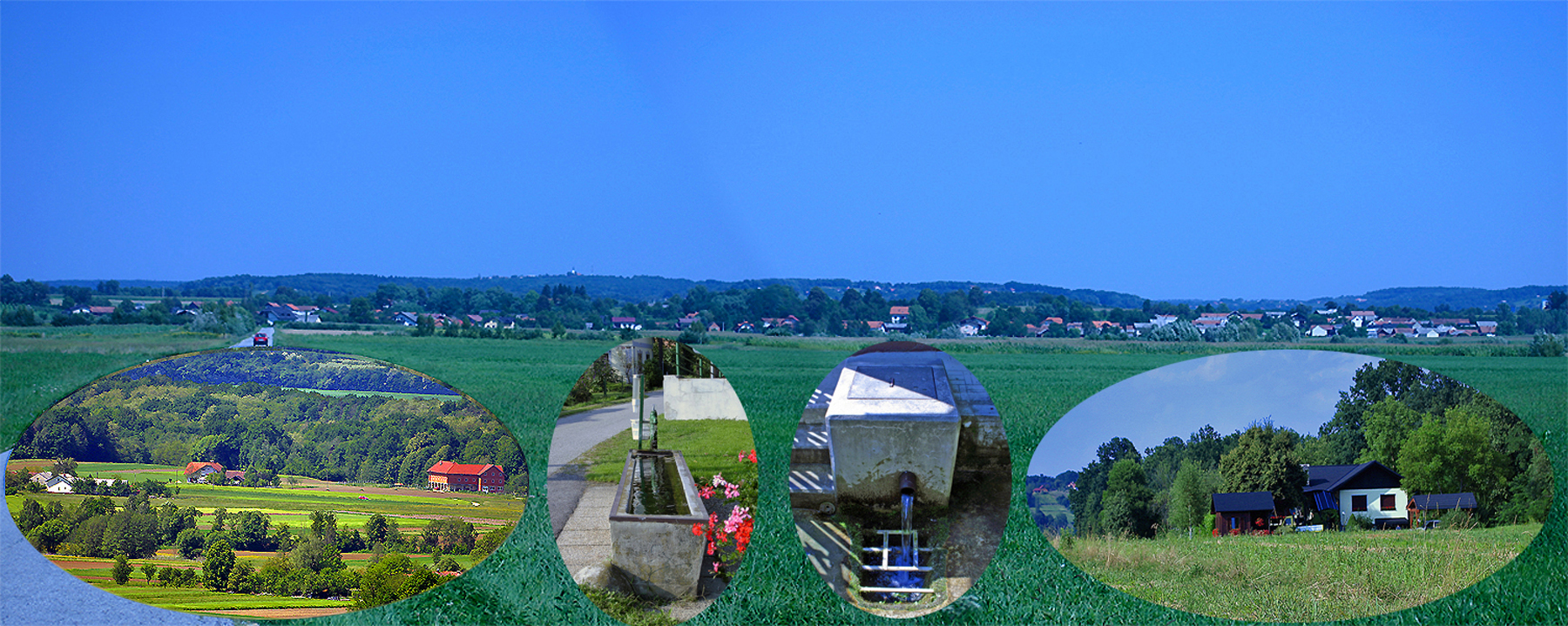
Picture postcard of Gorica

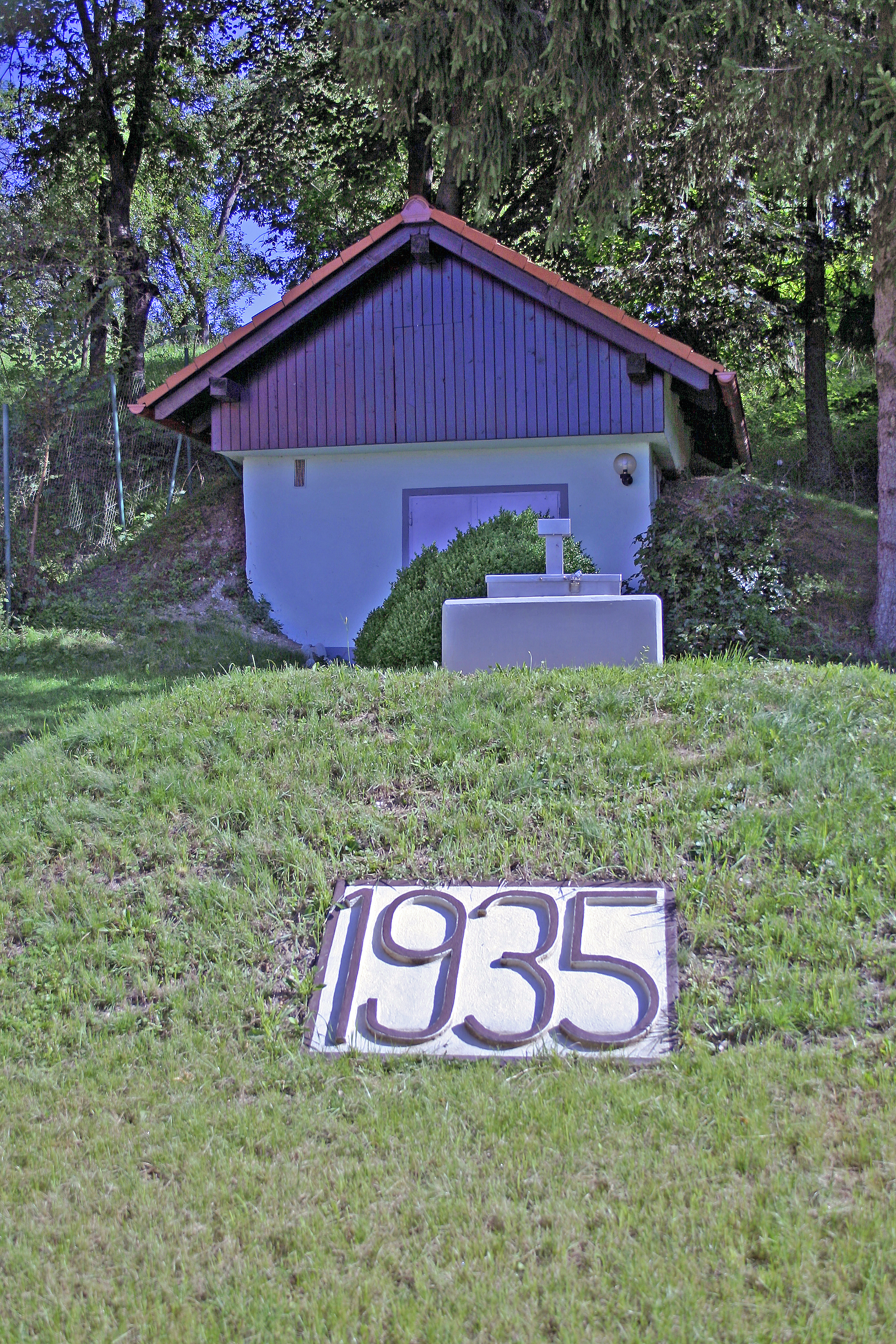
Building for water supply
