= Onek =

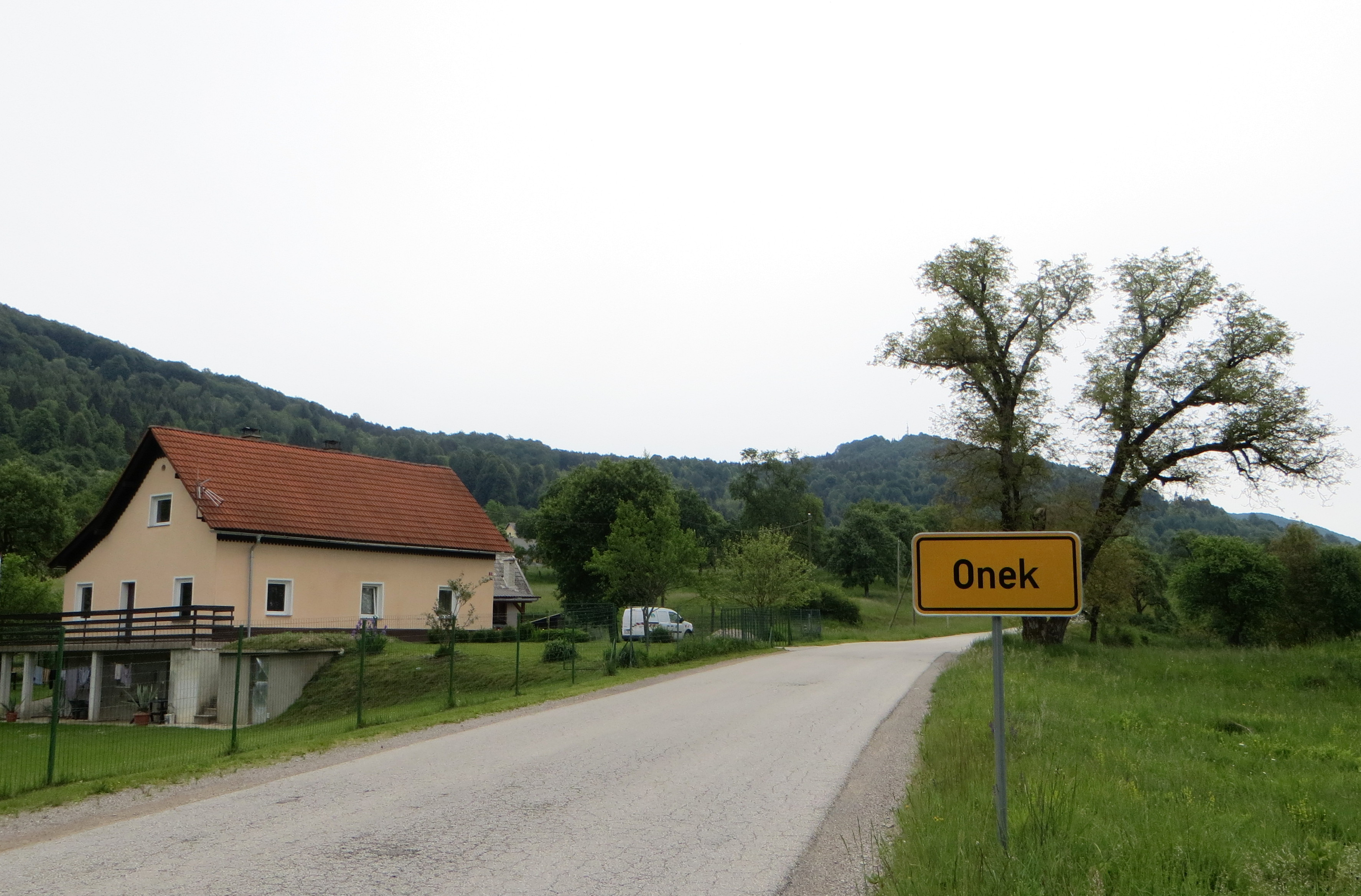

- Location in Slovenia
- Coordinates: 45°37′32.72″N 14°56′37.26″E
- Country: Slovenia
- Traditional region: Lower Carniola
- Statistical region: Southeast Slovenia
- Municipality: Kočevje

Area
  - Total: 15.66 km^{2} (6.05 sq mi)
- Elevation: 585.1 m (1,920 ft)

Population (2002)
  - Total: 31
- Postal code: 1330

Onek (pronounced [ˈoːnɛk]; German: Hohenegg, Gottscheerish: Wrneggə) is a settlement in the hills east of Kočevje in southern Slovenia. The area is part of the traditional region of Lower Carniola and is now included in the Southeast Slovenia Statistical Region.

== Name ==
The Slovene name Onek is derived from German Hohenegg. The German name Hohenegg and the Gottscheerish name Wrneggə are derived from hohen Eck 'high hillside, high slope', with the common southern German reflex -egg (< Old High German ekka), thus referring to a local geographical feature.

== History ==
Onek was a village settled by Gottschee Germans. In the land register of 1574, Onek is listed as having eight full farms that were subdivided into 16 half-farms, corresponding to a population between 90 and 100. The 1770 census recorded 29 houses in the village. A school was established in the village in 1884. In 1936 there were 37 houses in the village and a population of 140. There was substantial emigration from the village before the Second World War. At that time, its economy was based on agriculture, peddling, and the sale of timber and firewood. Its original population was evicted in November 1941. In the summer of 1942 Italian troops burned the area. After the Second World War the village was resettled by Slovenes from Prekmurje.

=== Mass graves ===
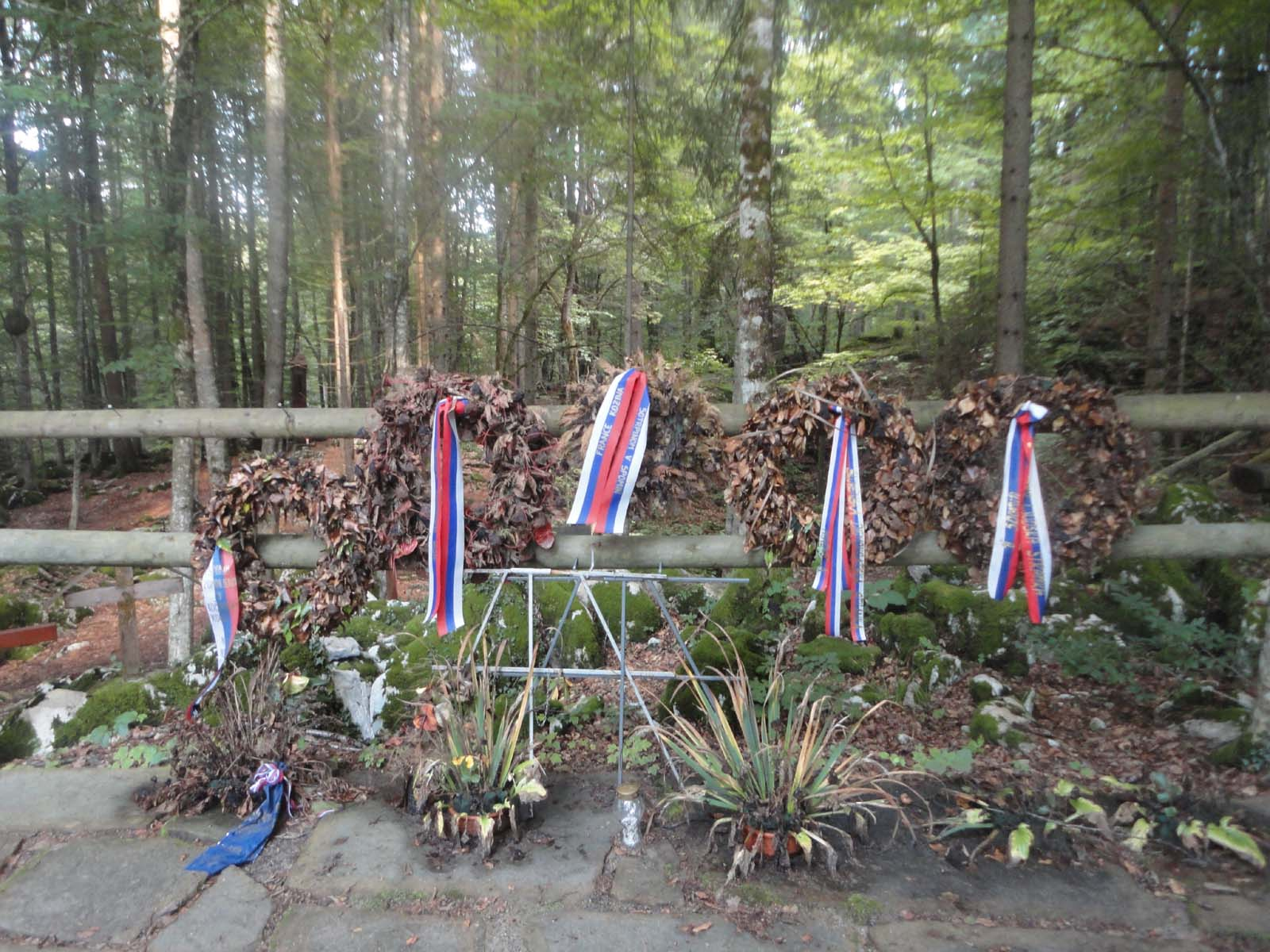
Kren Cave Mass Grave

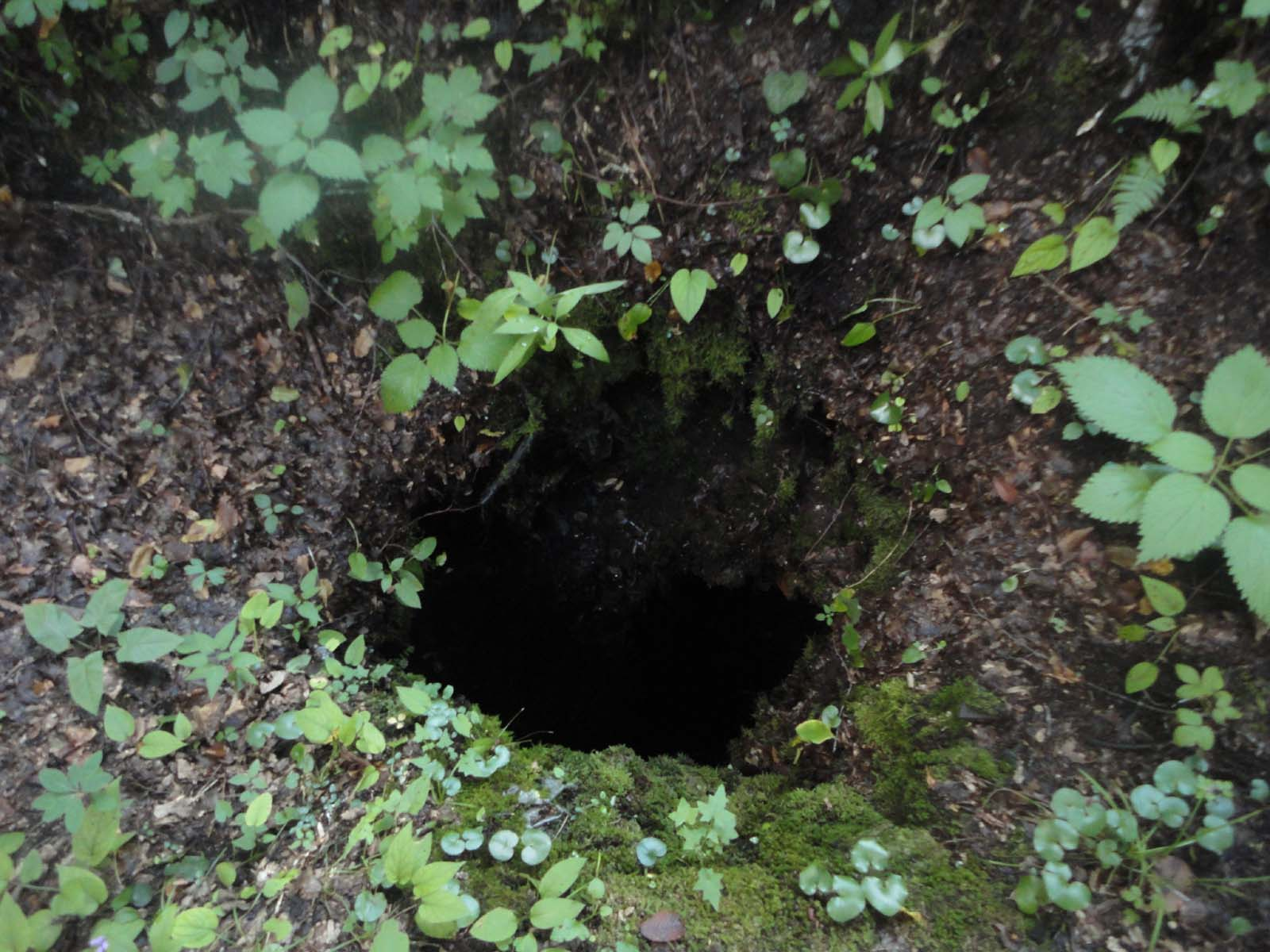
Debelič Meadow near Kren Cave Mass Grave

Onek is the site of two known mass graves from the period immediately after the Second World War. The Kren Cave Mass Grave (Slovene: Grobišče Jama pod Krenom) is located north of Onek in a sinkhole measuring 26 meters (85 ft) across and 7 meters (23 ft) deep. It contains the remains of soldiers from the Croatian Armed Forces, Serbians, and probably also Germans and Russian Cossacks transported from the prisons at Šentvid and Kočevje. The Debelič Meadow near Kren Cave Mass Grave (Grobišče Debliške livade pri Jami pod Krenom) is located about 20 meters (66 ft) behind the sign for the Kren Cave Mass Grave, 10 meters (33 ft) below the road, in the direction of the Rog Sawmill. It contains the remains of soldiers that were unable to walk to Kren Cave from the point to which they were transported by truck. A series of roadside wooden sculptures several meters high representing the Stations of the Cross, created by Stane Jarm (1931–2011) in 1998, mark the route to the graves from nearby Željne.

== Religious heritage ==
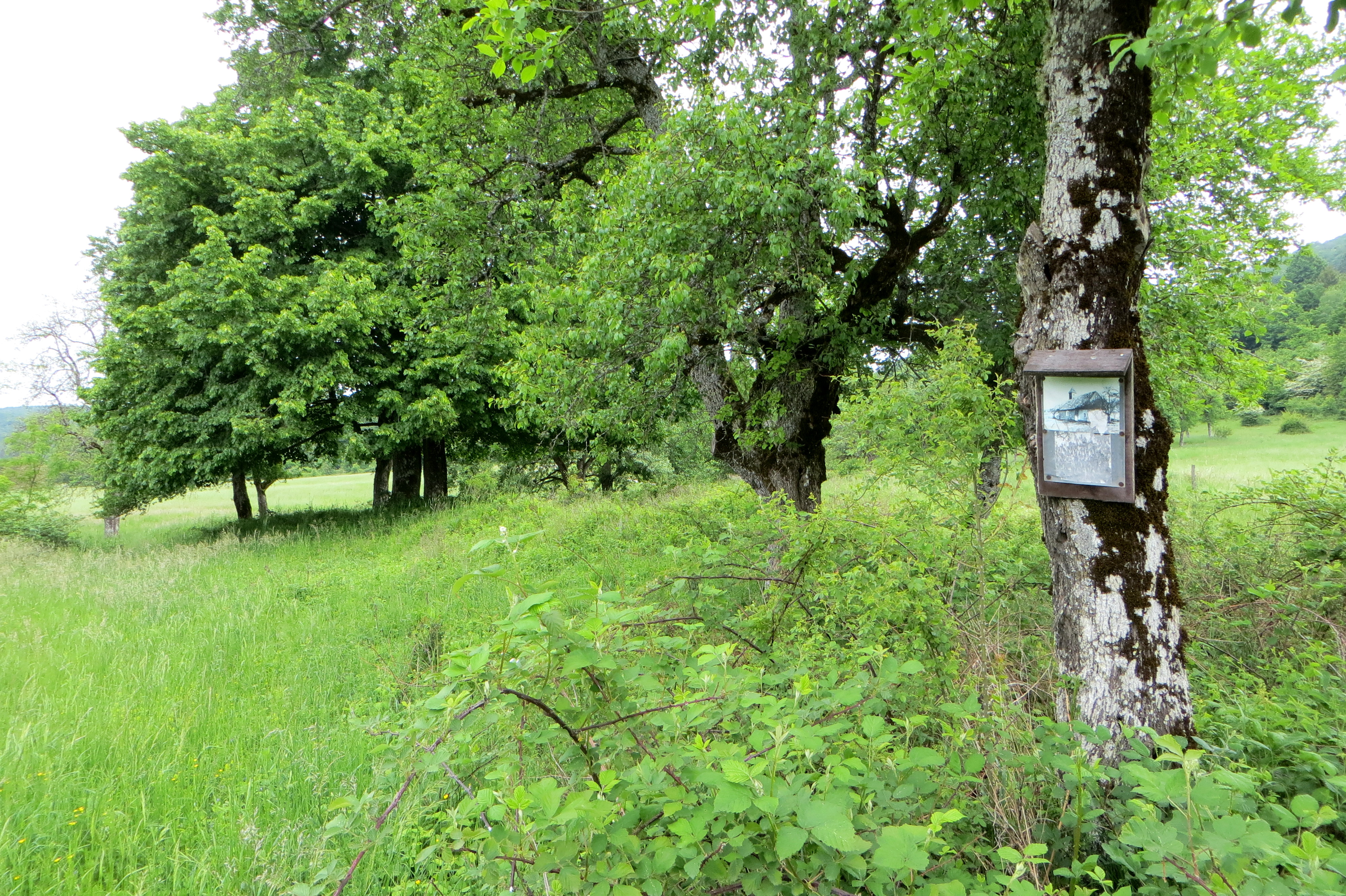
Former site of Saints Cosmas and Damian Chapel

A 17th-century chapel dedicated to Saints Cosmas and Damian formerly stood at a fork in the road north of Onek. The year 1662 (or perhaps 1862) was carved into a roof beam of the chapel. The keystone of the door casing was carved with the inscription IHS 1817 and the letters GIGK, probably indicating that it was renovated in 1817, the same year that the new Saint Anne's Church was built in neighboring Mačkovec. The chapel had a square nave and a polygonal chancel walled on three sides with a shingled gabled roof. On the ridge of the roof there was a wooden bell tower with a square hip roof. According to the Slovenian Cultural Heritage Registry, the chapel was burned during the Second World War; however, according to Ferenc, it was in good condition after the war and only the interior furnishings were damaged. Masses were held in the chapel immediately after the war, and then it was used to store hay. The chapel was demolished in 1955, and its site is registered as cultural heritage.

A church dedicated to Saint Anne stood above the village, in the territory of what is now Mačkovec. It was demolished in 1965.
