= Mihály Szever Vanecsai =

Slovenian Lutheran priest and author

- Born: c. 1699; Vanecsa (Vaslak or Vaneča), Prekmurje region
- Died: 1750 (aged 50–51); Nemescsó
- Other names: Miháo Sever Vaneča, Miháo Sever z Vaneča
- Occupation: Lutheran priest
- Notable work: Réd zvelicsánsztva (Expectant Salvation)

Réd zvelicsánsztva (1747)

Mihály Szever Vanecsai, also known in Slovenian as Miháo Sever Vaneča or Miháo Sever z Vaneča (ca. 1699–1750) was a Hungarian Slovenian Lutheran priest, born in the village of Vanecsa (Vaslak or Vaneča) in the Prekmurje region. He died in Nemescsó.

In 1742 he wrote the book Réd zvelicsánsztva (Expectant Salvation), published in Germany in Halle on the Saale.

== See also ==
- List of Slovene writers and poets in Hungary
