= Moščanci =

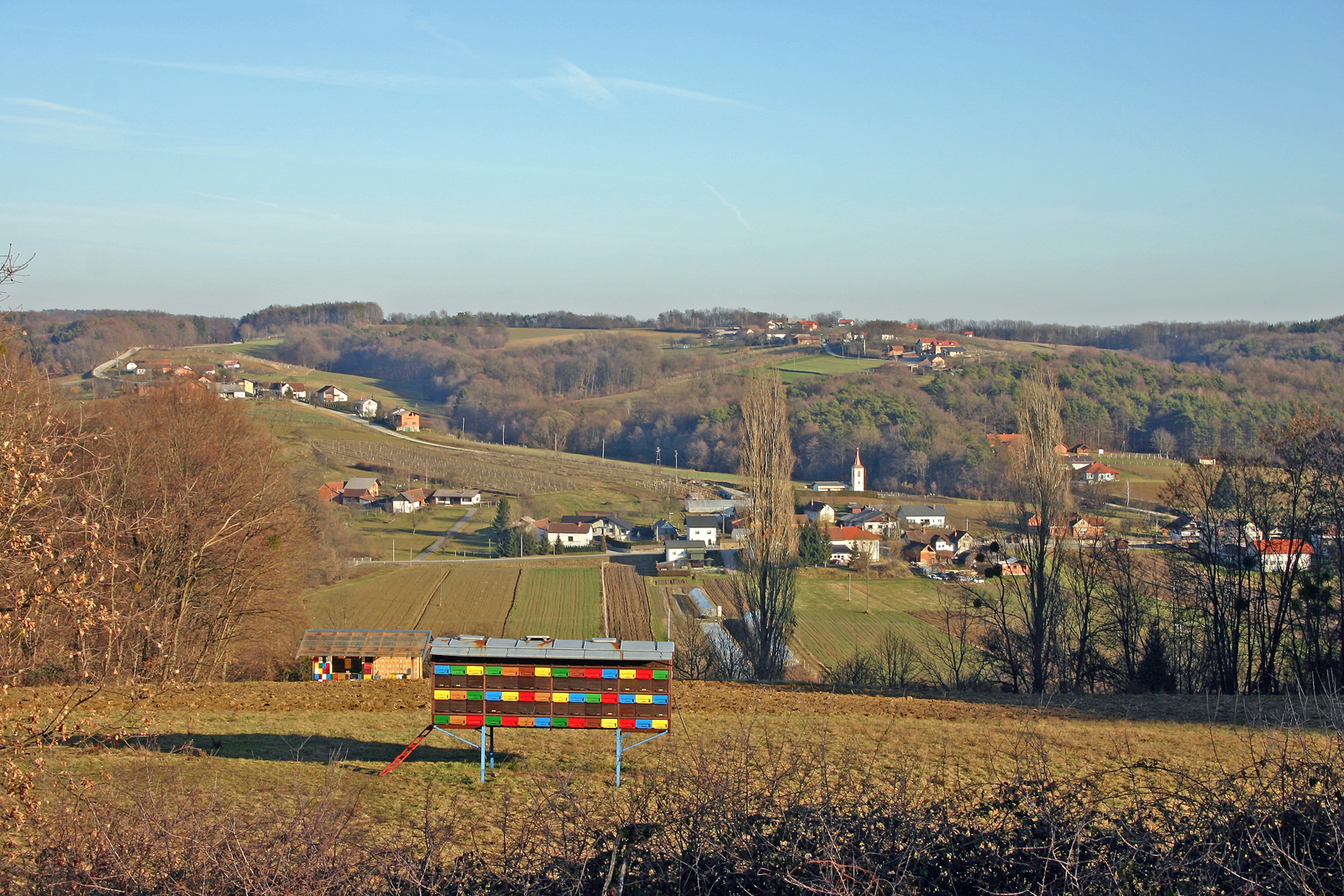

- Location in Slovenia
- Coordinates: 46°45′11.33″N 16°10′21.77″E
- Country: Slovenia
- Traditional region: Prekmurje
- Statistical region: Mura
- Municipality: Puconci

Area
  - Total: 5.55 km^{2} (2.14 sq mi)
- Elevation: 282.8 m (928 ft)

Population (2002)
  - Total: 275

Moščanci (pronounced [mɔˈʃtʃaːntsi]; in older sources also Moštjanci, Hungarian: Musznya) is a village in the Municipality of Puconci in the Prekmurje region of Slovenia.
