= Jožef Kerec =

Slovenian prelate (1892–1974)

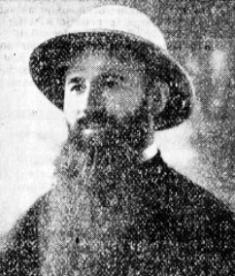
Jožef Kerec

Jožef Kerec (born Kerécz József) (15 October 1892 in Prosečka Vas – 27 June 1974) was the first Slovene Salesian missionary in China.

Kerec spent his childhood in the Prosečka Vas, Prekmurje (by 1920 in Hungary, Slovene March), where his family was from. Before departing for China, Kerec was politically active in Prekmurje. On 17 August 1919, a few days after Prekmurje became part of the Kingdom of Serbs, Croats and Slovenes (colloquially called Yugoslavia), he spoke at a big public rally in Beltinci in support of Slovenia and the Kingdom, because he was Slovene and Slave.

As a missionary, Jožef Kerec departed to Macau in 1921, arrived there on 18 August 1921 and had his first mass in Macau on 26 June 1923. He also worked in Malaysia, Vietnam, Hong Kong and in China, where from 1939 till 1951 he was the apostolic administrator in the city of Zhaotong. Kerec died and was buried in Veržej, Slovenia. A memorial plaque to him is on the wall of the parish church in Pečarovci.
