= Lemerje =

Lemerje Nyíreslehomér
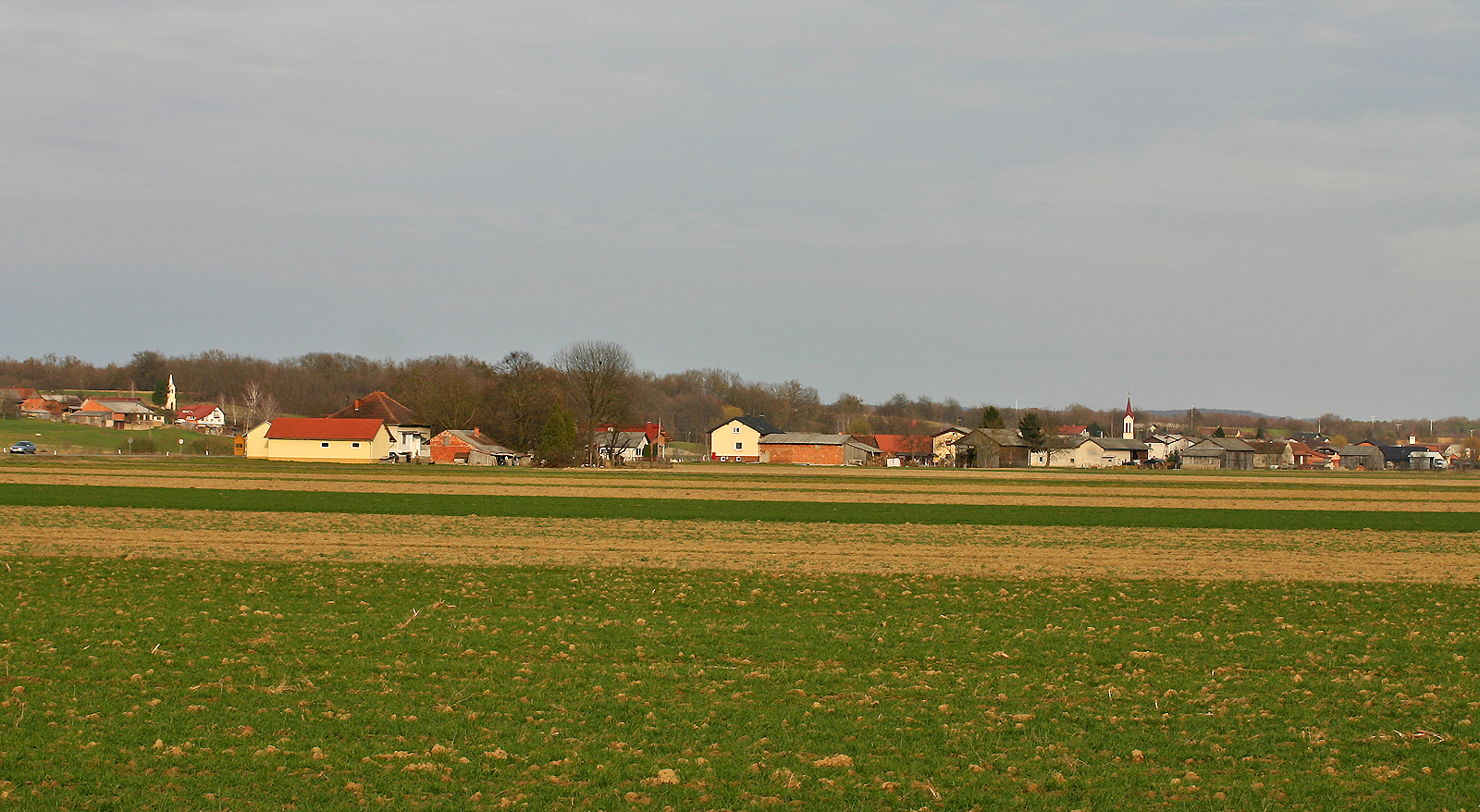

- Location in Slovenia
- Coordinates: 46°42′33.8″N 16°6′13.51″E
- Country: Slovenia
- Traditional region: Prekmurje
- Statistical region: Mura
- Municipality: Puconci

Area
  - Total: 4.98 km^{2} (1.92 sq mi)
- Elevation: 202 m (663 ft)

Population (2002)
  - Total: 295

Lemerje (pronounced [ˈleːmɛɾjɛ]; Hungarian: Nyíreslehomér, Prekmurje Slovene: Lömergje) is a village in the Municipality of Puconci in the Prekmurje region of Slovenia.

There are two chapels in the settlement. The Lutheran chapel, built in the Neogothic style in 1925, is on the north side of the main road. The Catholic chapel was built in 1928, also in the Neogothic style, and is dedicated to the Holy Cross.

== Notable people ==
Notable people that were born or lived in Lemerje include:

- Mátyás Godina (ca. 1768–1835), writer
