= Puževci =

Puževci Pálmafa
- Location in Slovenia
- Coordinates: 46°42′23.9″N 16°4′51.85″E
- Country: Slovenia
- Traditional region: Prekmurje
- Statistical region: Mura
- Municipality: Puconci

Area
  - Total: 2.61 km^{2} (1.01 sq mi)
- Elevation: 205.6 m (675 ft)

Population (2002)
  - Total: 194

Puževci (pronounced [ˈpuːʒɛu̯tsi]; in older sources also Pužovci, Hungarian: Pálmafa) is a small village in the Municipality of Puconci in the Prekmurje region of Slovenia.

There is a small neogothic chapel by the village cemetery. It was built in 1890 and has a three-story belfry.
