= Zenkovci =

Zenkovci Zoltánháza
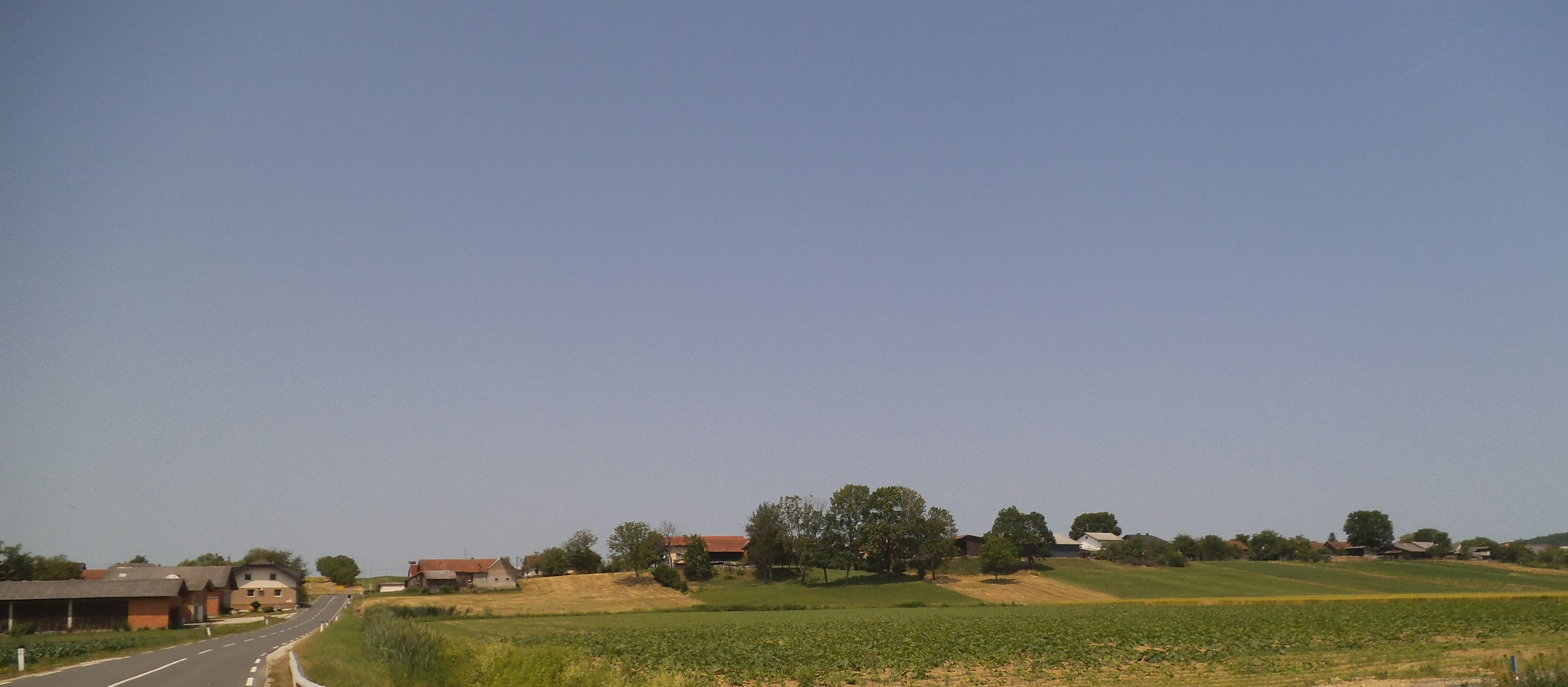

- Location in Slovenia
- Coordinates: 46°43′23.17″N 16°4′48.82″E
- Country: Slovenia
- Traditional region: Prekmurje
- Statistical region: Mura
- Municipality: Puconci

Area
  - Total: 4.21 km^{2} (1.63 sq mi)
- Elevation: 220.6 m (724 ft)

Population (2002)
  - Total: 354

Zenkovci (pronounced [zɛŋˈkoːu̯tsi]; Prekmurje Slovene: Zenkouvci, Hungarian: Zoltánháza) is a settlement in the Municipality of Puconci in the Prekmurje region of Slovenia.
