= Teja Ferfolja =

Slovenian handball player

Personal information
- Nationality: Slovenian
- Born: 20 September 1991 (age 35) Gorica, Slovenia
- Height: 1.83 m (6 ft 0 in)

Sport
- Sport: Handball
- Position: Pivot
- Current club: PAOK
- Number: 15
National team
Years	Team	Apps	(Gls)
–	Slovenia	73	(54)

Teja Ferfolja (born 20 September 1991) is a Slovenian handball player for CSM Roman and the Slovenian national team.

She participated at the 2016 European Women's Handball Championship.
