= Bodonci =

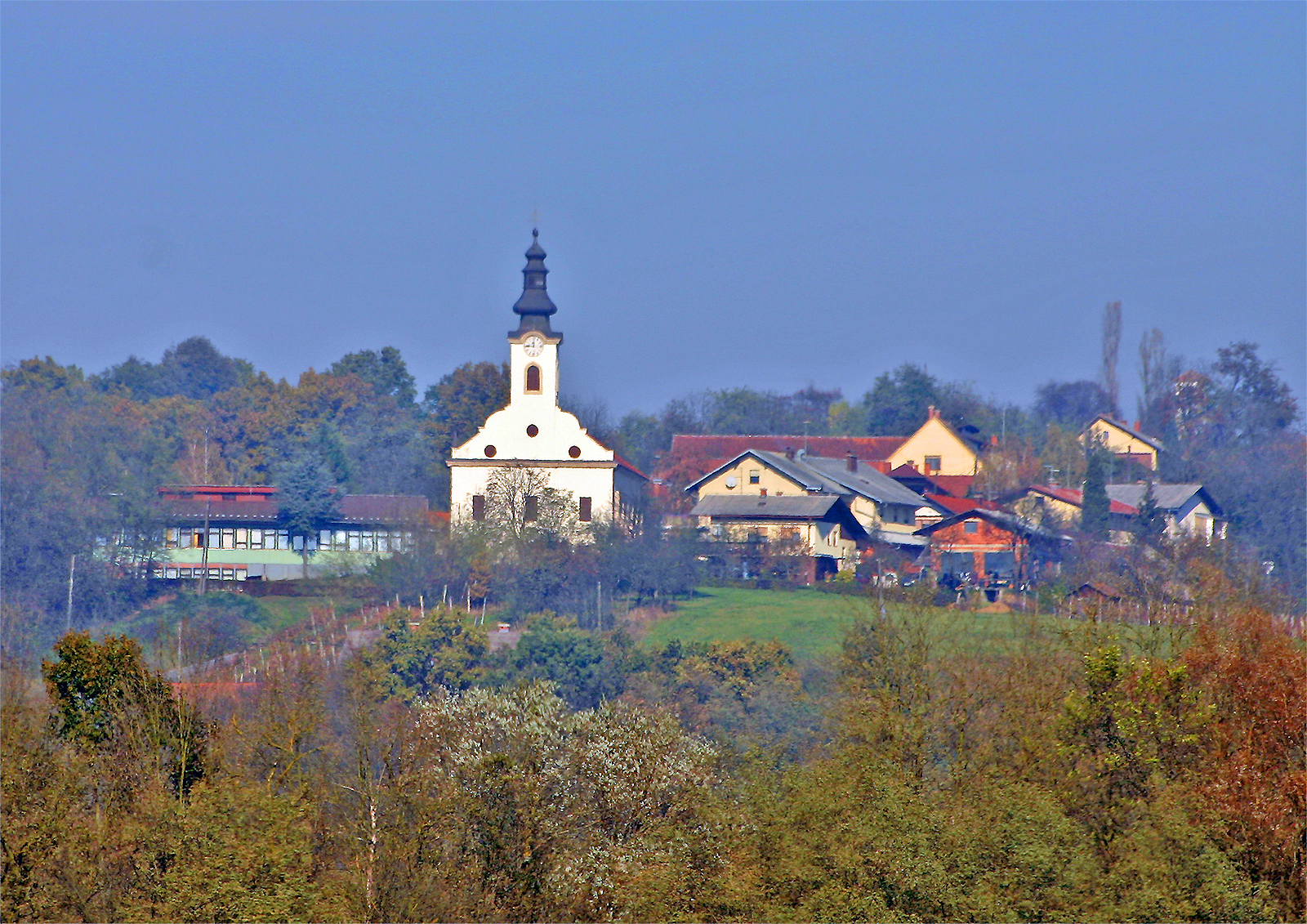

- Location in Slovenia
- Coordinates: 46°44′36.62″N 16°6′40.52″E
- Country: Slovenia
- Traditional region: Prekmurje
- Statistical region: Mura
- Municipality: Puconci

Area
  - Total: 7.37 km^{2} (2.85 sq mi)
- Elevation: 240.1 m (788 ft)

Population (2002)
  - Total: 436

Bodonci (pronounced [ˈboːdɔntsi]; Hungarian: Bodóhegy) is a village in the Municipality of Puconci in the Prekmurje region of Slovenia.

There is a large Lutheran church named after István Küzmics (Števan Küzmič) in the settlement. The original church was a wooden structure built in 1792. In 1800 this was replaced by a more solid structure, but the current church was built on the same site in 1899, based on the plans by the architect Daniel Placotta from Budapest and is a typical example of a church with a central nave and two side aisles with a gallery and tall narrow windows.

== Notable people ==
Notable people that were born or lived in Bodonci include:

- István Szmodis (1758–?), writer
