= Mačkovec, Kočevje =

Mačkovec
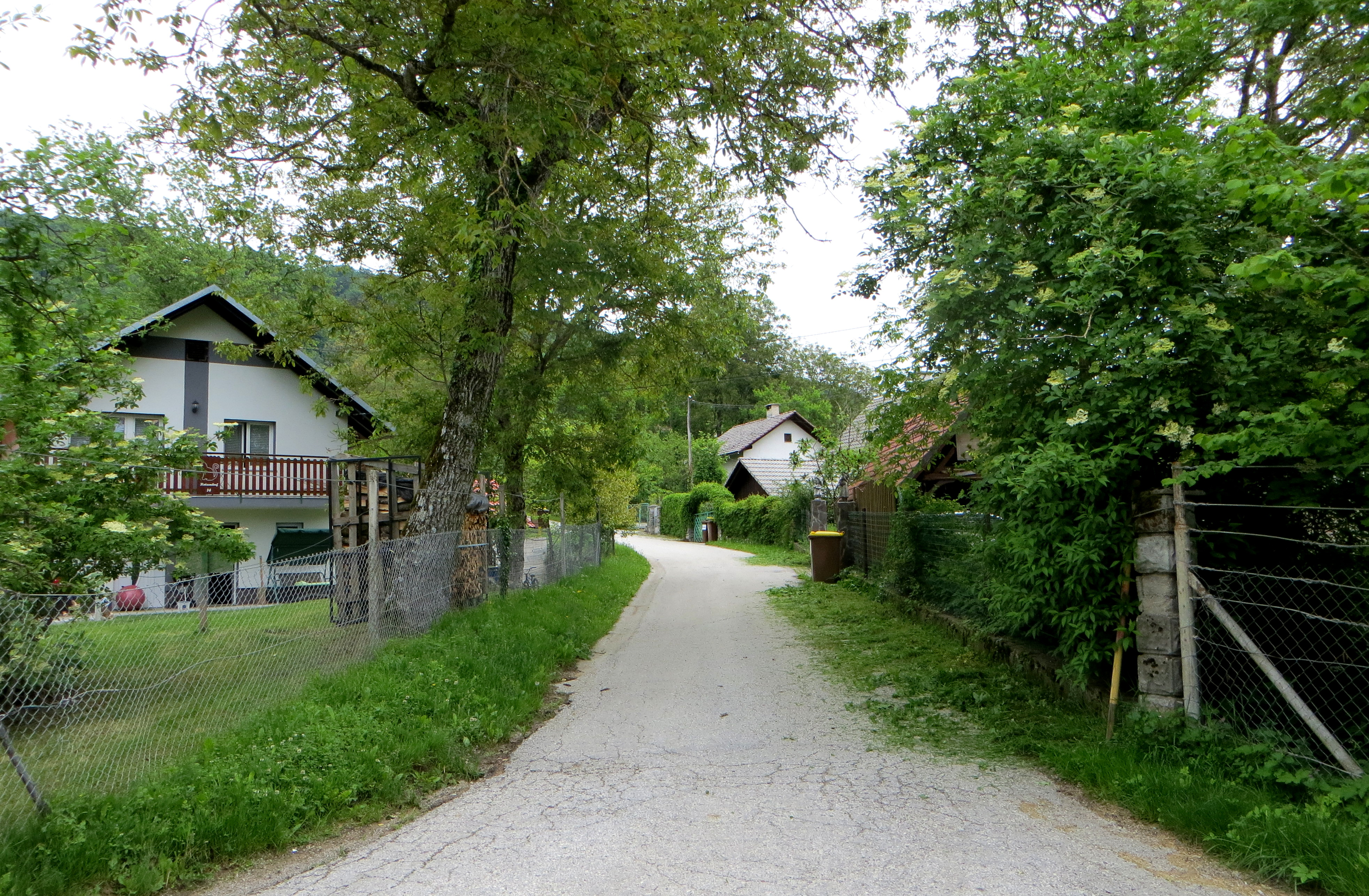

- Location in Slovenia
- Coordinates: 45°36′47.39″N 14°57′29.92″E
- Country: Slovenia
- Traditional region: Lower Carniola
- Statistical region: Southeast Slovenia
- Municipality: Kočevje

Area
  - Total: 5.48 km^{2} (2.12 sq mi)
- Elevation: 616.6 m (2,023 ft)

Population (2002)
  - Total: 30
- Postal code: 1330

Mačkovec (pronounced [ˈmaːtʃkɔʋəts]; formerly also Mačkova vas, German: Katzendorf, sometimes Kazendorf, Gottscheerish: Kotzndoarf) is a settlement in the Municipality of Kočevje in southern Slovenia. The area is part of the traditional region of Lower Carniola and is now included in the Southeast Slovenia Statistical Region.

== Name ==
The name Mačkovec and names like it (e.g., Mačkovci, Mački, etc.) are believed not to derive directly from the Slovene common noun maček 'cat', as suggested by Simonič, but from the surname Maček (which is based on that zoonym and remains a Slovene surname today). An alternative theory, considered less likely by Snoj, is that Mačkovec is derived from the Slovene common noun mačkovec 'goat willow' or 'restharrow'. The alternative Slovene name Mačkova vas would thus mean 'village where the Maček family lives'. The German name Katzendorf is believed to derive from the Gottschee German surname Kotze, thus meaning 'village where the Kotze family lives', and not from the German common noun Katze 'cat'. The surname Kotze was attested in Gottschee in the 18th, 19th, and early 20th centuries.

== History ==
A prehistoric settlement has been identified near Mačkovec. However, there was no continuity between this early settlement and the modern age. In the modern era, Mačkovec was originally a Gottschee German village. In the land registry of 1574, Mačkovec had four full farms divided into eight half-farms, corresponding to a population between 40 and 50. In 1770 there were 18 houses in the village. In 1936 there were 22 houses in the village and it had a population of 93. The local economy was based on farming and peddling. The original residents of Mačkovec were evicted in November 1941. German forces burned the settlement in March 1944 and only two houses remained.

== Religious heritage ==
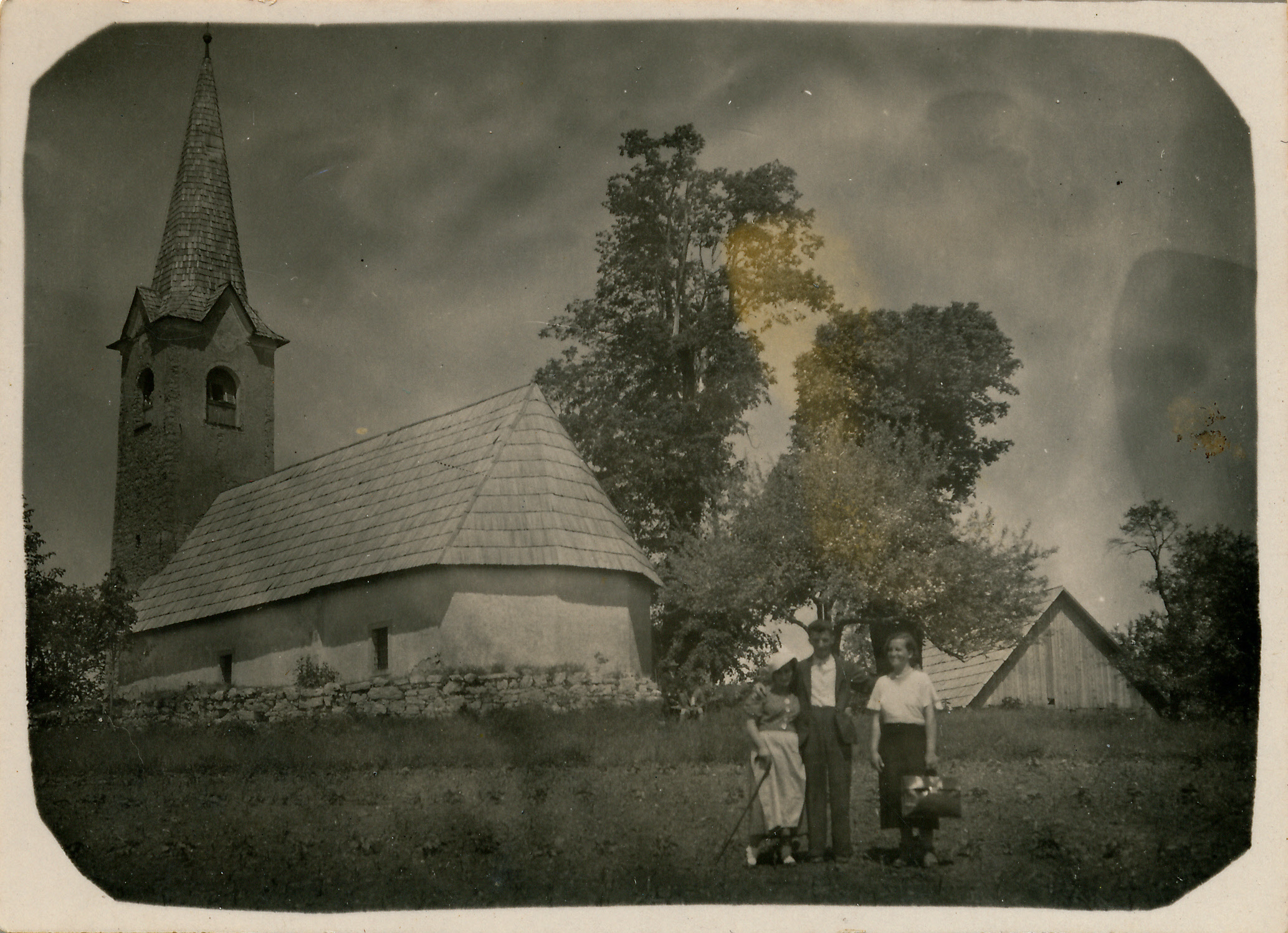
The church circa 1930

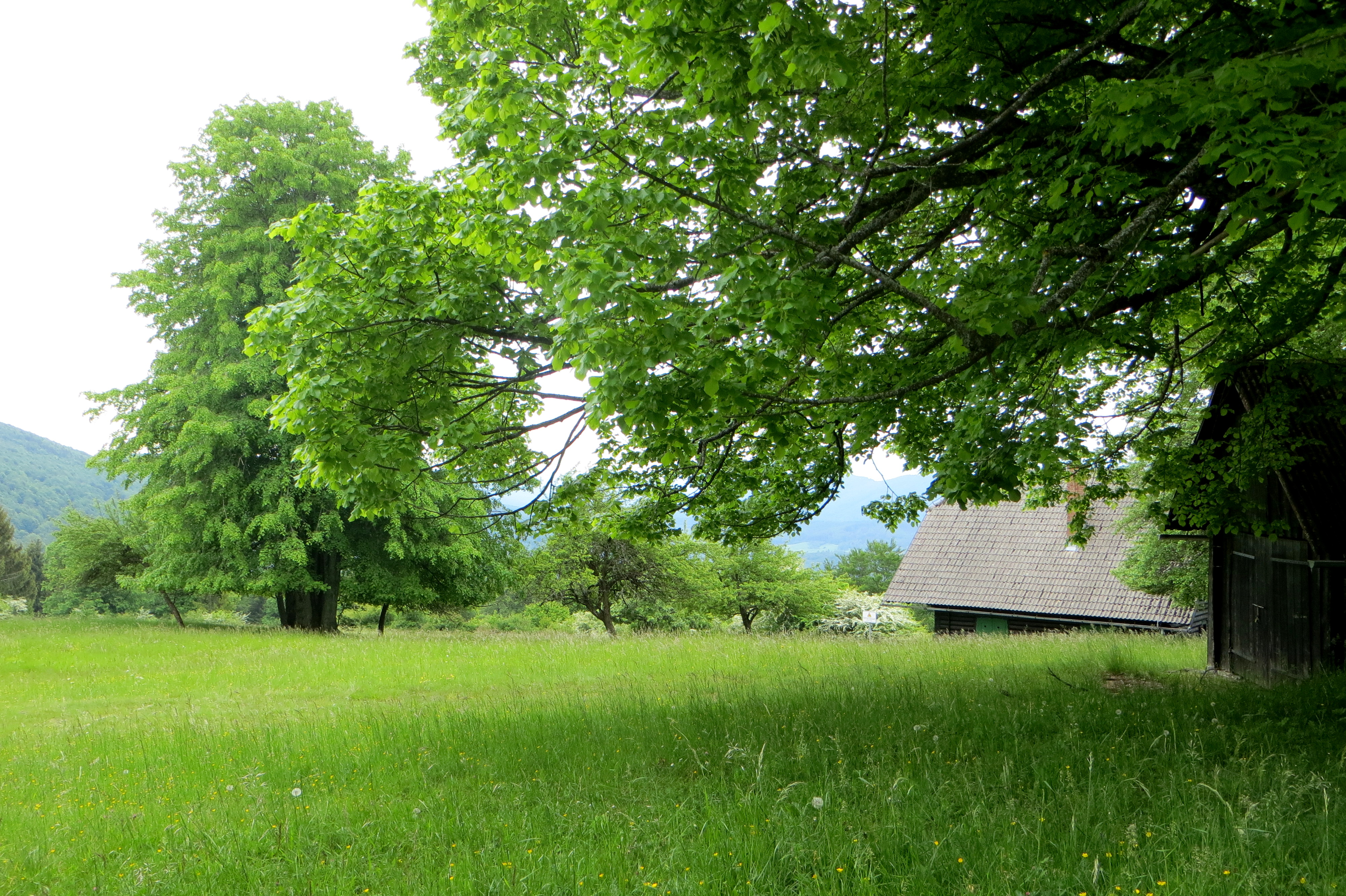
Former church site in 2020

St. Anne's Church

The local church, dedicated to Saint Anne, was built on the top of Hunter's Peak (Slovene: Lovski vrh, German: Annaberg 'Mount Saint Anne') north of the settlement. It is also a site of a prehistoric Iron Age settlement. The pilgrimage church, a 16th-century building that survived the Second World War, was demolished in 1953 or 1954. A chapel-shrine dedicated to Saint Anne was erected next to the site of the former church in 2003.

A chapel dedicated to the Holy Wounds formerly stood in the village. It was probably built after 1741, and had a vaulted chancel and a flat, possibly painted, roof in the nave. Over the entrance there was a wooden bell-cot, built in 1819 when a bell was purchased. The bell was removed by Austro-Hungarian troops. The chapel had a chalice designed in a Renaissance style. In 1930 three local families—Kofler, Springer, and Stiene—purchased a new 60 kg bell for the chapel. The chapel was destroyed after the village was burned in 1944.
