= Dankovci =

- Location in Slovenia
- Coordinates: 46°45′52.41″N 16°9′55.32″E
- Country: Slovenia
- Traditional region: Prekmurje
- Statistical region: Mura
- Municipality: Puconci

Area
  - Total: 4.2 km^{2} (1.6 sq mi)
- Elevation: 258.4 m (848 ft)

Population (2023)
  - Total: 134
  - Density: 31.9/km^{2} (83/sq mi)

Dankovci (pronounced [daŋˈkoːu̯tsi]; Hungarian: Őrfalu) is a village in the Municipality of Puconci in the Prekmurje region of Slovenia. In 2023, it had a population of 134 (69 males and 65 females). It has an area of 4.2 km² with a population density of 31.90/km².

The section of the Slovenian Railways line from Murska Sobota to Hodoš runs through the village.
