= Mački =

Mački may refer to:

- Mački, Slovenia, a village near Velike Lašče
- Mački, Croatia, a village near Farkaševac
