= Otovci =

Otovci Ottóháza
- Location in Slovenia
- Coordinates: 46°48′7.36″N 16°9′2.11″E
- Country: Slovenia
- Traditional region: Prekmurje
- Statistical region: Mura
- Municipality: Puconci

Area
  - Total: 6.79 km^{2} (2.62 sq mi)
- Elevation: 315.7 m (1,036 ft)

Population (2002)
  - Total: 255

Otovci (pronounced [ˈoːtɔu̯tsi]; Hungarian: Ottóháza) is a village in the Municipality of Puconci in the Prekmurje region of Slovenia.
