= Bokrači =

Bokrači Bokreči
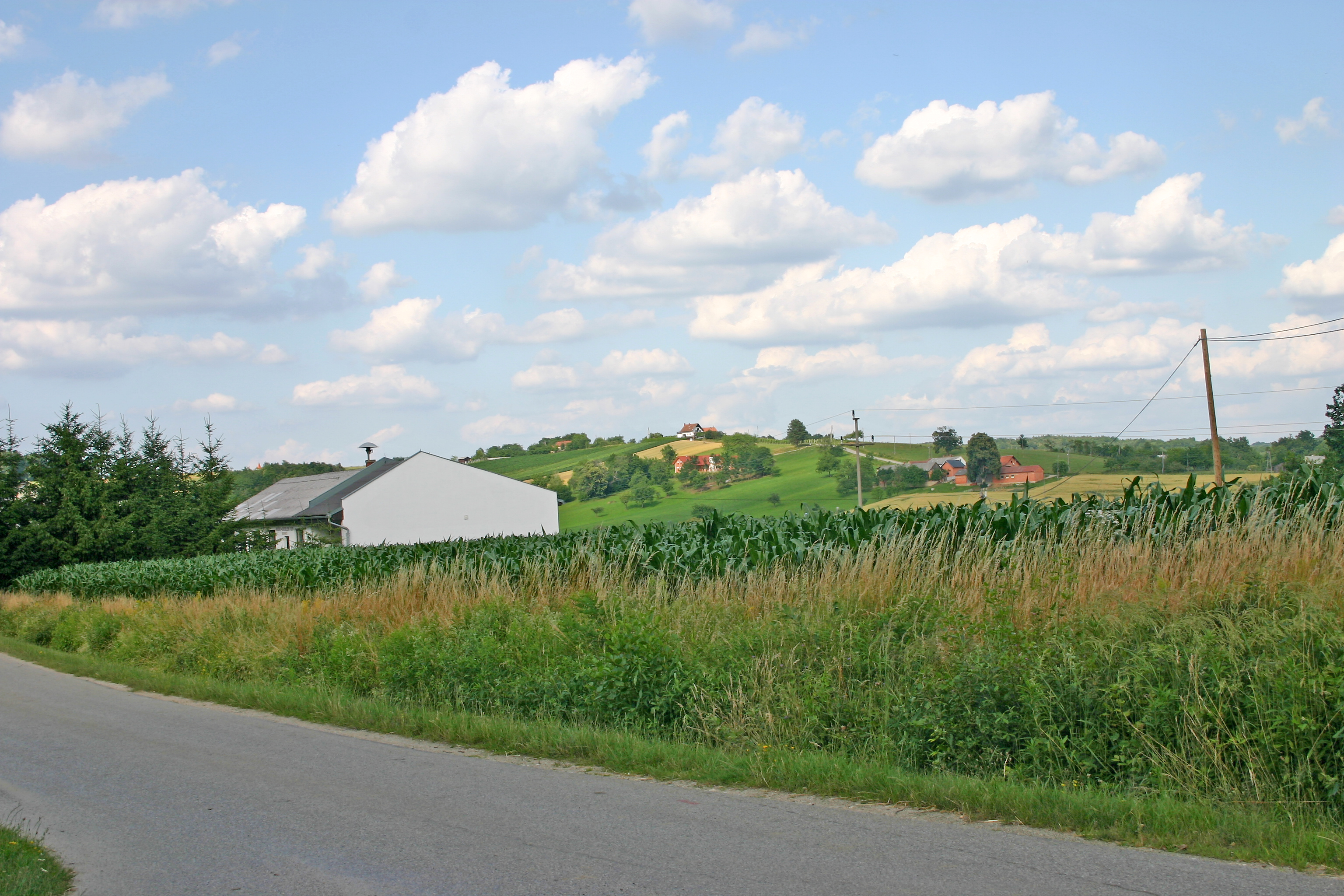

- Location in Slovenia
- Coordinates: 46°43′55″N 16°11′45.37″E
- Country: Slovenia
- Traditional region: Prekmurje
- Statistical region: Mura
- Municipality: Puconci

Area
  - Total: 2.84 km^{2} (1.10 sq mi)
- Elevation: 267.9 m (879 ft)

Population (2002)
  - Total: 70

Bokrači (pronounced [ˈboːkɾatʃi]; in older sources and locally Bokreči, Hungarian: Bokrács) is a village in the Municipality of Puconci in the Prekmurje region of Slovenia. It is divided into Spodnji Bokrači (or Spodnja Ves, Slovene: Spodnja ves) with the Fartel, Mlinar, Vukon, and Žagar farms, Zgornji Bokrači (or Zgornja Ves, Slovene: Zgornja ves) with the hamlets of Talaberov Breg and Žgonjarov Breg, and the hamlets of Duge Gomile and Malačičevi.

== Name ==
Bokrači was attested in written sources in 1355 as Volkarach (and as Bolrah in 1359 and Wolcrach in 1370). The medieval attestations indicate that the name is derived from *Bolkrači, presumably a plural form of the personal name *Bolkrač, which is believed to be a hypocorism of a German name with the root *folc- (from which the German name Volker and Slovene name Volkar are derived). The name would thus refer to an early inhabitant of the place. A less likely possibility is that the name is derived from the Slavic hypocorism *Vьlkoračь. Locally, the village is known as Bokreči.

== Bibliography ==
- Jakopin, Franc (1985). Sluga, Meta (ed.). Slovenska krajevna imena. Ljubljana: Cankarjeva založba.
