= Poznanovci =

Poznanovci Poznónovci, Pálhegy
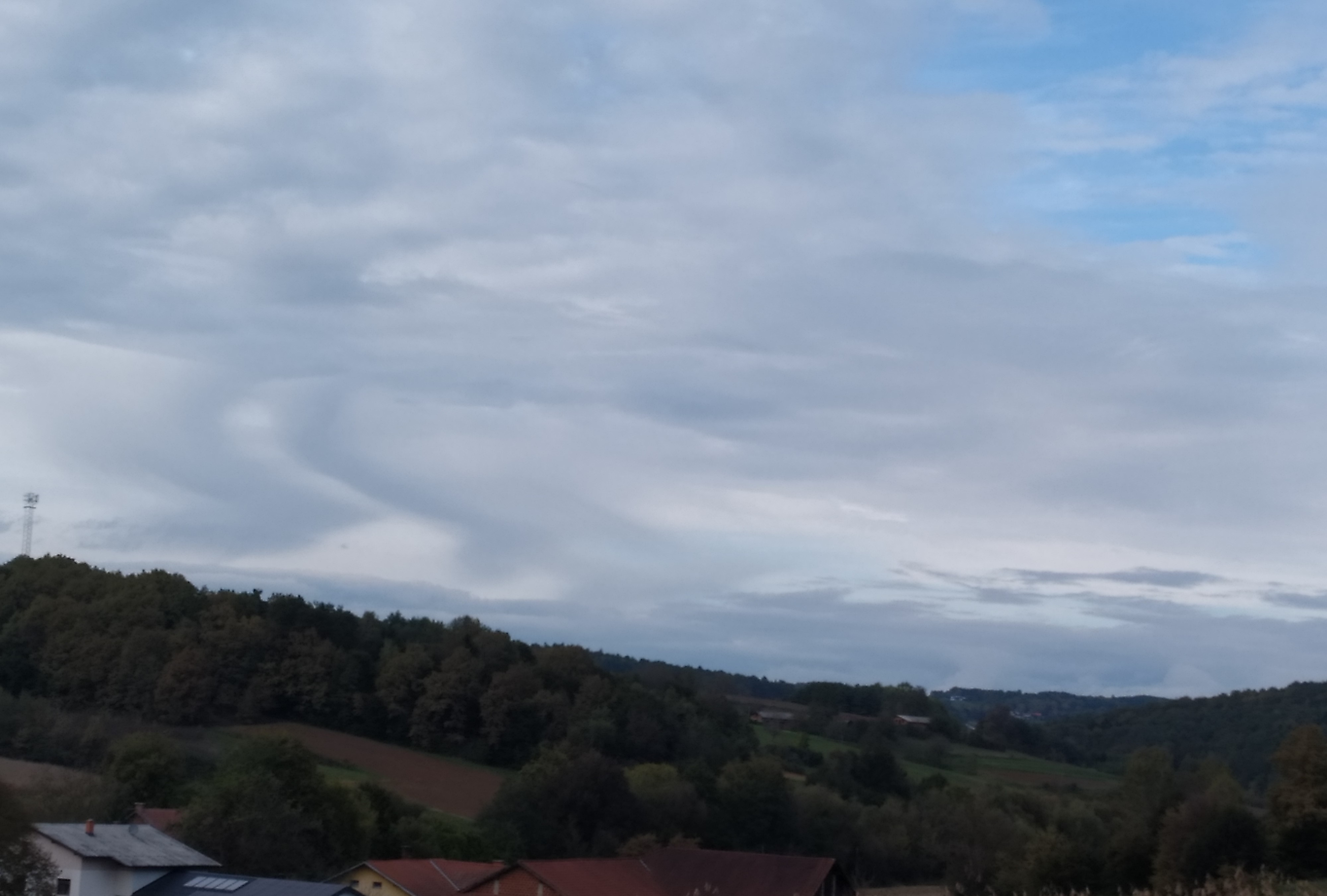
- Poznanovci

- Location in Slovenia
- Coordinates: 46°44′47.18″N 16°7′58.95″E
- Country: Slovenia
- Traditional region: Prekmurje
- Statistical region: Mura
- Municipality: Puconci

Area
  - Total: 8.11 km^{2} (3.13 sq mi)
- Elevation: 258.4 m (848 ft)

Population (2002)
  - Total: 211

Poznanovci (pronounced [pɔˈznaːnɔu̯tsi]; Prekmurje Slovene: Poznónovci, Hungarian: Pálhegy) is a dispersed village in the Municipality of Puconci in the Prekmurje region of Slovenia.

There is a small Lutheran chapel in the settlement.

== Bibliography ==
- Rešek, Dušan (1995). Brezglavjeki. Zgodbe iz Prekmurja. Ljubljana: ČZD Kmečki glas. ISBN 961-203-060-X.
