= Dolina, Puconci =

Dolina
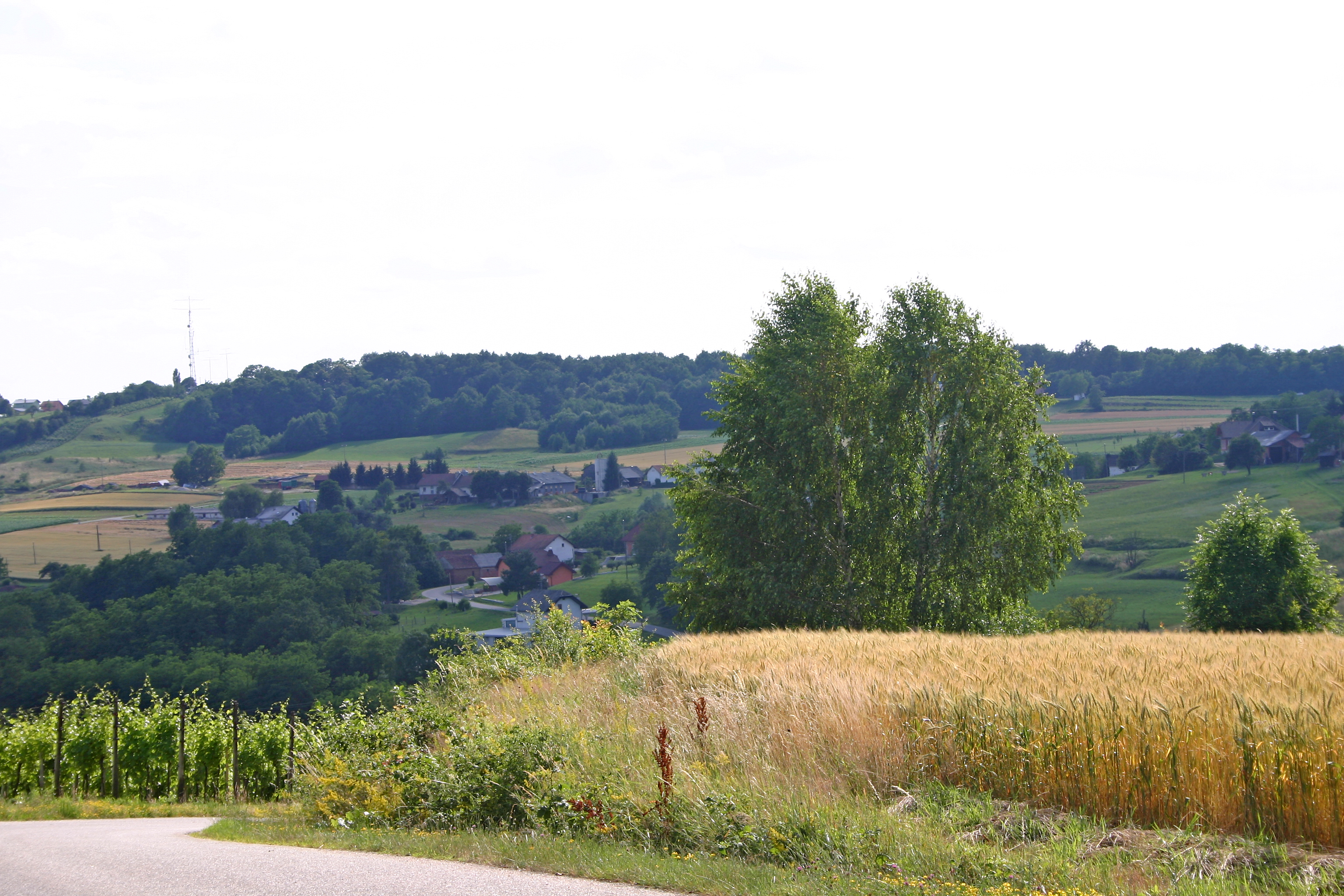

- Location in Slovenia
- Coordinates: 46°44′17.09″N 16°11′7.7″E
- Country: Slovenia
- Traditional region: Prekmurje
- Statistical region: Mura
- Municipality: Puconci

Area
  - Total: 3.33 km^{2} (1.29 sq mi)
- Elevation: 253.1 m (830 ft)

Population (2002)
  - Total: 199

Dolina (pronounced [ˈdoːlina]; Hungarian: Völgyes) is a village in the Municipality of Puconci in the Prekmurje region of Slovenia.
