= Beznovci =

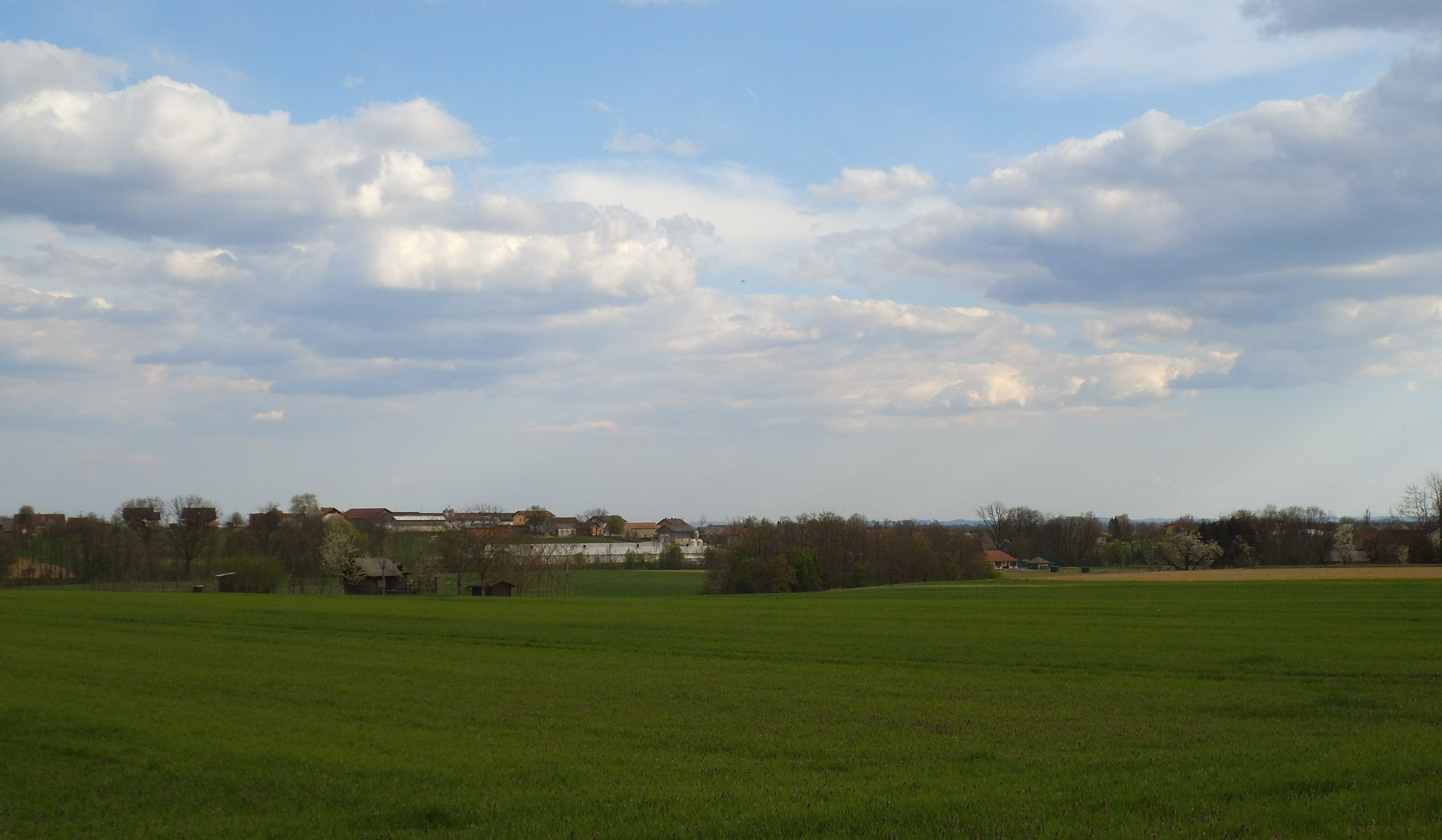

- Location in Slovenia
- Coordinates: 46°43′56.2″N 16°4′17.9″E
- Country: Slovenia
- Traditional region: Prekmurje
- Statistical region: Mura
- Municipality: Puconci

Area
  - Total: 2.77 km^{2} (1.07 sq mi)
- Elevation: 231.9 m (761 ft)

Population (2002)
  - Total: 174

Beznovci (pronounced [bɛˈznoːu̯tsi]; Hungarian: Búzahely) is a village in the Municipality of Puconci in the Prekmurje region of Slovenia.

== Geography ==
Beznovci lies on both sides of Beznovci Creek (Beznovski potok), a tributary of the Ledava River. Morphologically, it is partially a ribbon development and partially clustered. It includes the main settlement of Stari Beznovci along with the hamlets of Sinicova Graba, Bizikov Rob, Šerugov Gres, Spodnji Beznovci, and Novi Beznovci. The soil is marly to the north, a mix of marl and sand in the central area, and sandy to the south.

== History ==
A fire station was built in Beznovci in 1950, and in 1960 it was expanded into a town hall. Until 1952, Stari Beznovci and Novi Beznovci were separate settlements.
