= Municipality of Puconci =

Municipality of Slovenia

Municipality of Puconci Občina Puconci
- Municipality
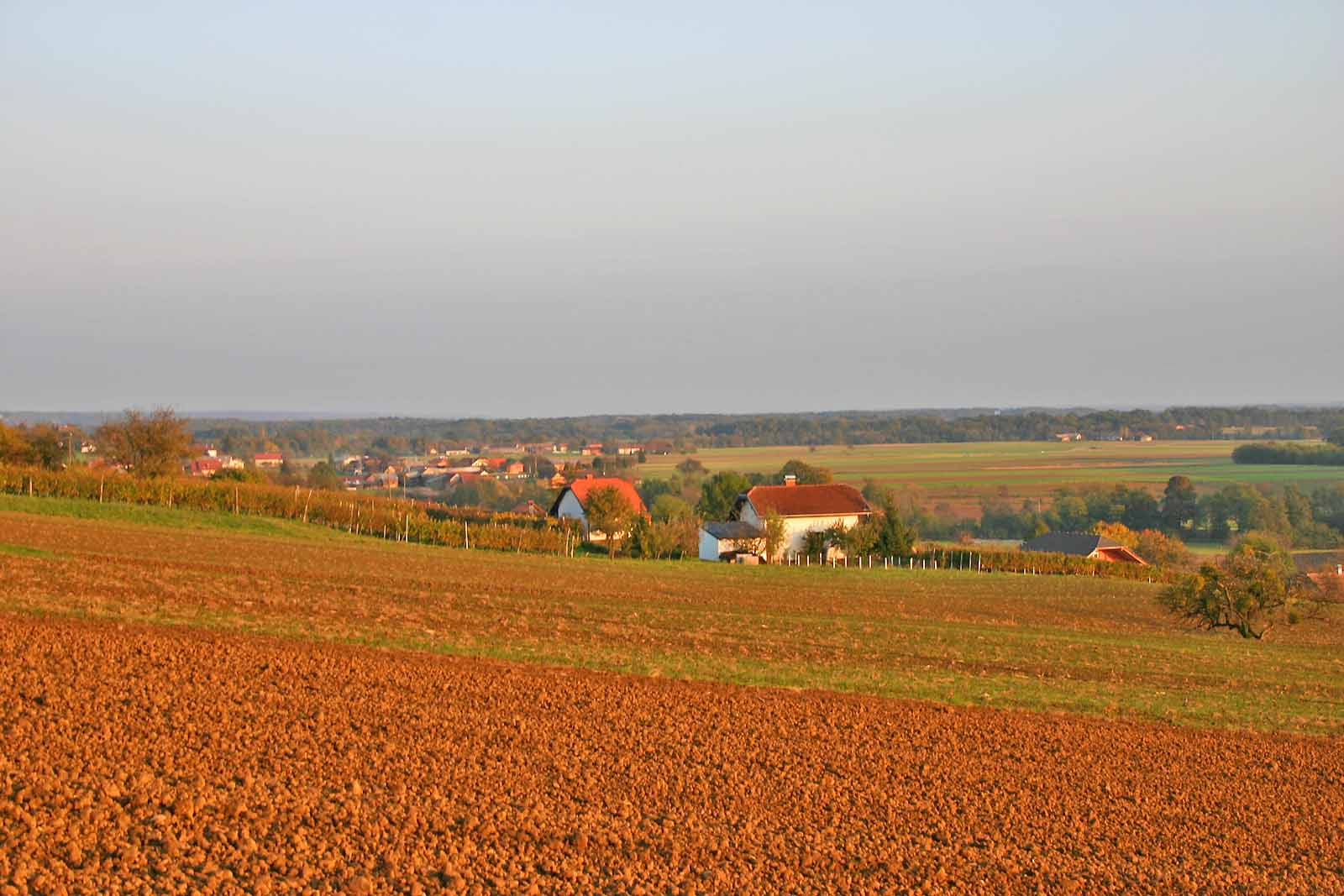

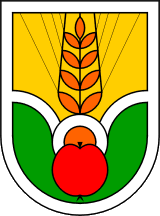
- Coat of arms

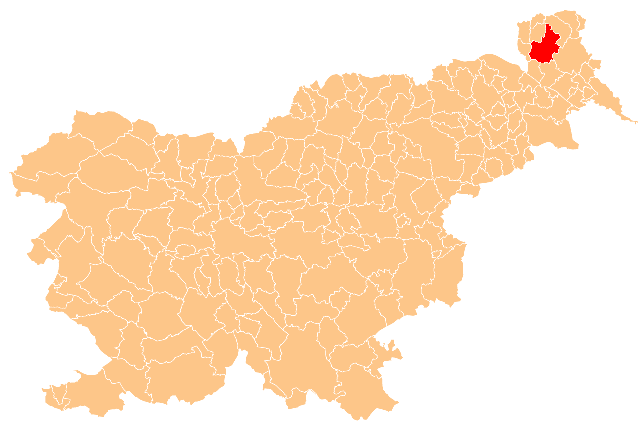
- Location of the Municipality of Puconci in Slovenia
- Coordinates: 46°45′N 16°08′E
- Country: Slovenia

Government
  - Mayor: Ludvik Novak

Area
  - Total: 108.0 km^{2} (41.7 sq mi)

Population (2018)
  - Total: 5,917
  - Density: 54.79/km^{2} (141.9/sq mi)
- Time zone: UTC+01 (CET)
  - Summer (DST): UTC+02 (CEST)
- Website: www.puconci.si

The Municipality of Puconci (pronounced [ˈpuːtsɔntsi]; Slovene: Občina Puconci) is a municipality in the traditional region of Prekmurje in northeastern Slovenia. The seat of the municipality is the town of Puconci. Puconci became a municipality in 1994.

The majority of the population is Lutheran, making Puconci one of the few Slovenian municipalities where the majority of the population belongs to a non-Catholic denomination.

== Settlements ==
In addition to the municipal seat of Puconci, the municipality also includes the following settlements:

- Beznovci
- Bodonci
- Bokrači
- Brezovci
- Dankovci
- Dolina
- Gorica
- Kuštanovci
- Lemerje
- Mačkovci
- Moščanci
- Otovci
- Pečarovci
- Poznanovci
- Predanovci
- Prosečka Vas
- Puževci
- Šalamenci
- Strukovci
- Vadarci
- Vaneča
- Zenkovci
