= Mátyás Godina =

Slovene Lutheran pastor, writer and teacher

Mátyás Godina (Slovene: Matjaž Godina, Prekmurje Slovene: Mátjaš Godina) (c. 1768 – January 1, 1835) was a Slovene Lutheran pastor, writer, and teacher in Hungary.

Born in Lemerje, Godina's family was of minor nobility. He went to school in Surd in Somogy County, where he lived and worked with two Slovene writers: István Küzmics and Mihály Bakos. Godina graduated from the Lutheran Lyceum of Sopron and returned to his home region Tótság (Prekmurje) as a consecrated priest.

Between 1793 and 1799, Godina worked as a teacher, and after the death of the priest István Szmodis Godina became the pastor in 1821. From 1821 until his death, Godina was a priest and a teacher in Gornji Petrovci.

Godina wrote church hymns, sermons, and school curricula in the Prekmurje dialect.

== See also ==
- List of Slovene writers and poets in Hungary

== Sources ==
- Evangeličanska cerkvena občina Bodonci
- Vili Kerčmar: Evangeličanska cerkev na Slovenskem, Murska Sobota 1995.
