= Prosečka Vas =

Prosečka Vas Prosečka ves
- Location in Slovenia
- Coordinates: 46°46′45.88″N 16°8′16.06″E
- Country: Slovenia
- Traditional region: Prekmurje
- Statistical region: Mura
- Municipality: Puconci

Area
  - Total: 4.15 km^{2} (1.60 sq mi)
- Elevation: 263.6 m (865 ft)

Population (2002)
  - Total: 129

Prosečka Vas (pronounced [pɾɔˈseːtʃka ˈʋaːs]; Slovene: Prosečka vas, locally Prosečka ves, Hungarian: Kölesvölgy is a village in the Municipality of Puconci in the Prekmurje region of Slovenia.
