= Polana, Murska Sobota =

Polana
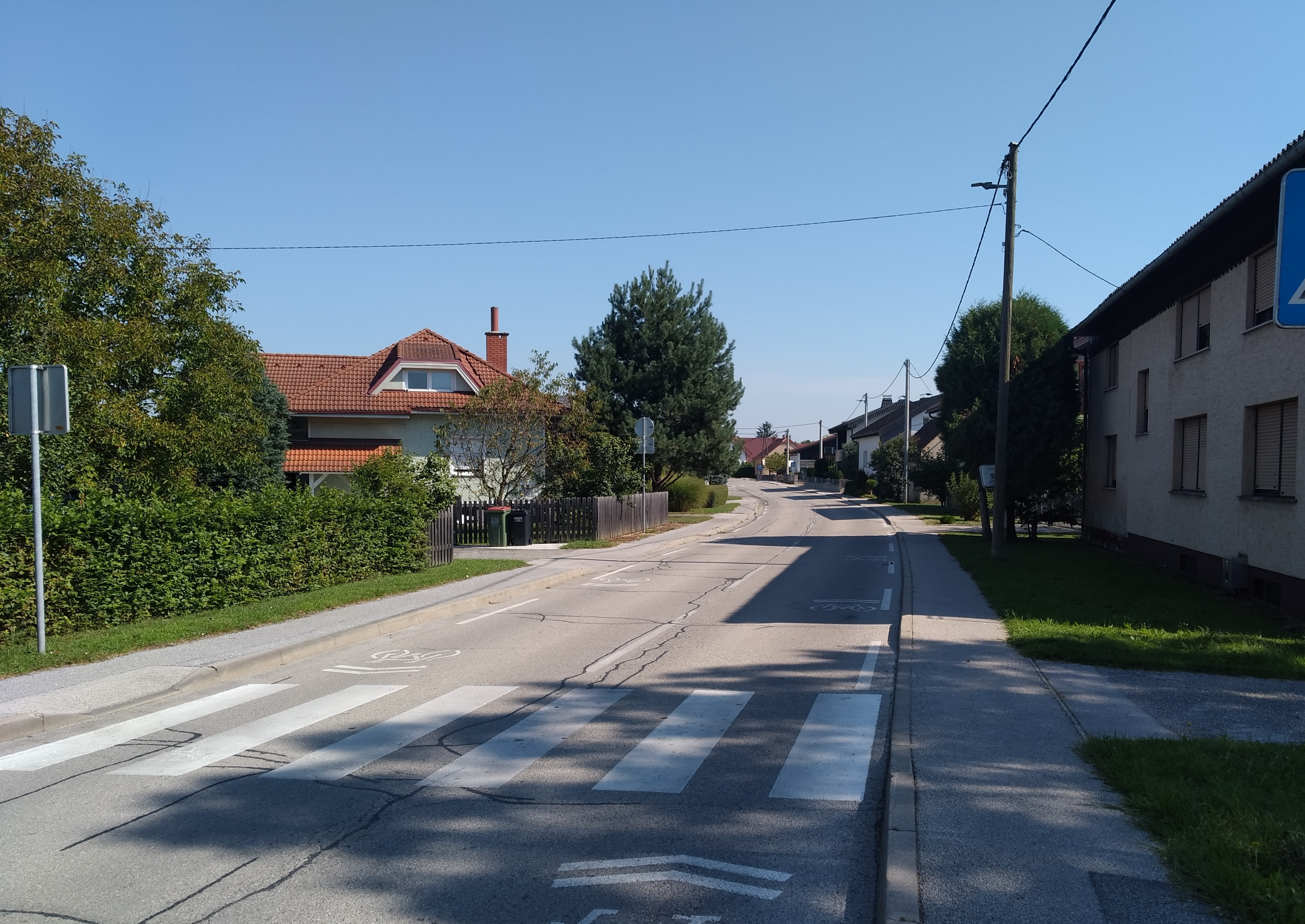

- Location in Slovenia
- Coordinates: 46°40′52″N 16°8′19″E
- Country: Slovenia
- Traditional region: Prekmurje
- Statistical region: Mura
- Municipality: Murska Sobota

Area
  - Total: 2.28 km^{2} (0.88 sq mi)
- Elevation: 194.2 m (637 ft)

Population (2002)
  - Total: 198

Polana (pronounced [ˈpoːlana]; Hungarian: Vaspolony) is a village in the Municipality of Murska Sobota in the Prekmurje region of Slovenia.
