= Šalamenci =

Šalamenci Salamon
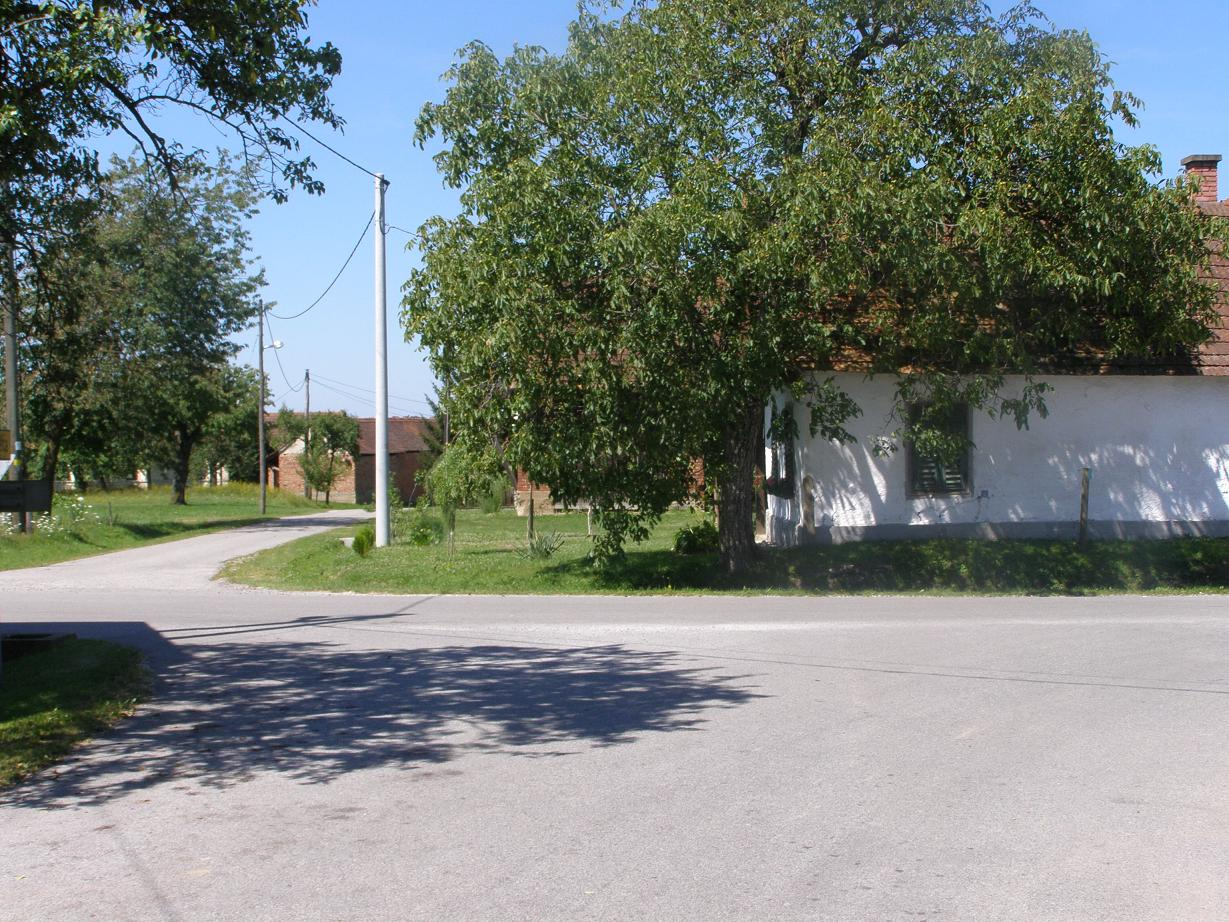

- Location in Slovenia
- Coordinates: 46°43′34.46″N 16°8′16.73″E
- Country: Slovenia
- Traditional region: Prekmurje
- Statistical region: Mura
- Municipality: Puconci

Area
  - Total: 5.52 km^{2} (2.13 sq mi)
- Elevation: 234.1 m (768 ft)

Population (2002)
  - Total: 316

Šalamenci (pronounced [ʃaˈlaːmɛntsi]; Hungarian: Salamon) is a village in the Municipality of Puconci in the Prekmurje region of Slovenia.

== Notable people ==
Notable people that were born or lived in Šalamenci include:

- János Fliszár (1856–1947), writer, poet, and journalist
