= Liszó =

Coordinates: 46°22′N 17°00′E

- Village
- Interactive map of Liszó
- Country: Hungary
- Region: Western Transdanubia
- County: Zala County
- Time zone: UTC+1 (CET)
  - Summer (DST): UTC+2 (CEST)

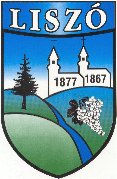
Coat of Arms of Liszó, Hungary

Liszó is a village in Zala County, Hungary.
