= Mačkovci =

- Location in Slovenia
- Coordinates: 46°47′1.78″N 16°9′48.81″E
- Country: Slovenia
- Traditional region: Prekmurje
- Statistical region: Mura
- Municipality: Puconci

Area
  - Total: 5.55 km^{2} (2.14 sq mi)
- Elevation: 271 m (889 ft)

Population (2002)
  - Total: 217

Mačkovci (pronounced [matʃˈkoːu̯tsi]; Hungarian: Mátyásdomb) is a village in the Municipality of Puconci in the Prekmurje region of Slovenia.

The section of the Slovenian Railways line between Murska Sobota and Hodoš runs through the village.

To the west of the main settlement stands the Marof Mansion, a hunting lodge built by Count Szápáry around 1900. It was used as a summer residence by the counts of Murska Sobota. It is a two-story building with a turret on its east side and the original interior furnishings are preserved, although the surrounding park is no longer maintained. The mansion is currently being renovated and a wine cellar is being built in the hope of developing wine tourism in the region.
