= Puconci =

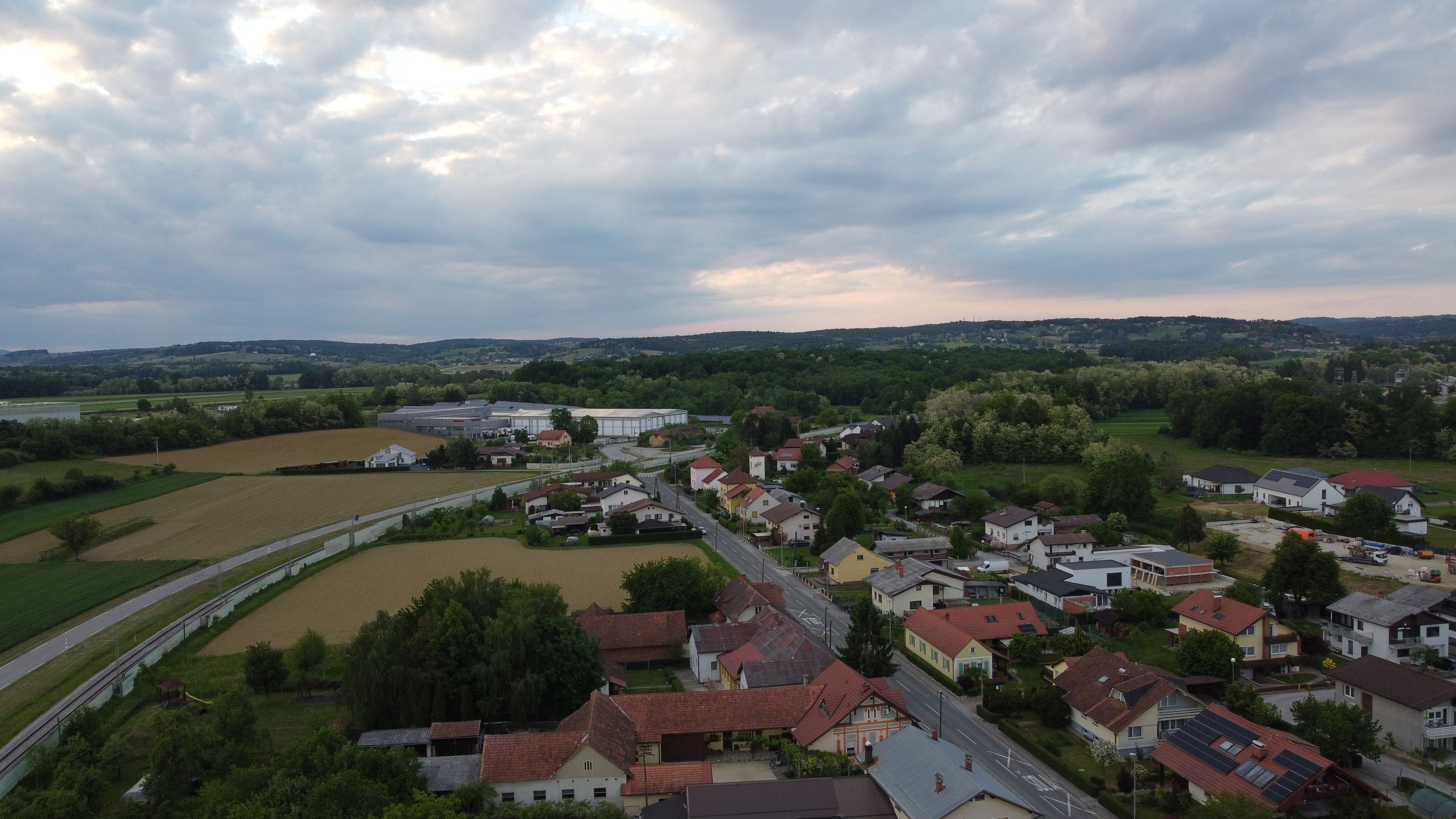

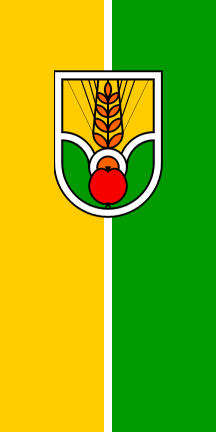
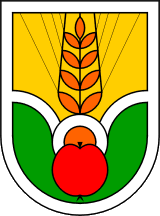
- Flag Coat of arms

- Location in Slovenia
- Coordinates: 46°42′14″N 16°09′26″E
- Country: Slovenia
- Traditional region: Prekmurje
- Statistical region: Mura
- Municipality: Puconci

Area
  - Total: 4.89 km^{2} (1.89 sq mi)
- Elevation: 205.7 m (675 ft)

Population (2019)
  - Total: 633

Puconci (pronounced [ˈpuːtsɔntsi]; in older sources also Pucinci, Hungarian: Battyánd, Prekmurje Slovene: Püconci) is a settlement in the Prekmurje region in northeastern Slovenia. It is the seat of the Municipality of Puconci. Prior to 1920 it was known as Battyánd.

== Church ==
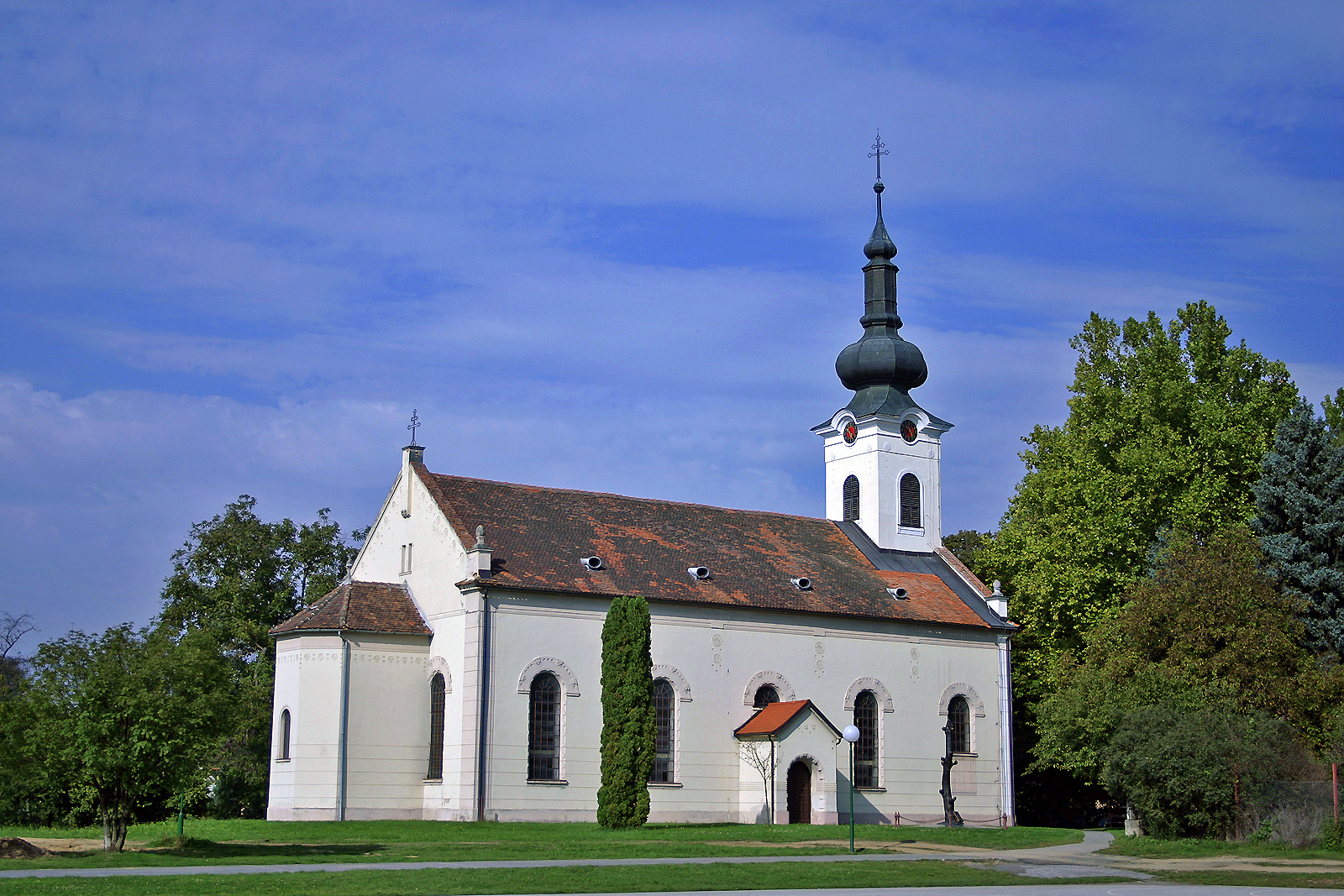
Puconci Lutheran church

There is a Lutheran church in the middle of the settlement, built in 1784, the first Lutheran church in the region of Prekmurje. It was rebuilt and restyled in 1909.

== Notable people ==
Prominent natives and residents of Puconci include the writers István Lülik, Sándor Terplán, Rudolf Czipott, and Ferenc Berke, and the politician Feri Horvat.
