= Hungarian toponyms in Prekmurje =

The following is a list of Hungarian place names for towns and villages in the Prekmurje region of Slovenia. This region belonged to Kingdom of Hungary prior to the Treaty of Trianon.

== List of Hungarian place names ==
- Adrijanci, Andorháza, Adriáncz
- Andrejci, Andorhegy
- Bakovci, Barkóc
- Banuta, Bánuta
- Beltinci, Belatinc
- Benica, Benice
- Berkovci, Berkeháza
- Beznovci, Buzahely
- Bodonci, Bodóhegy, Bodoncz
- Bogojina, Bagonya
- Bokrači, Bokrács
- Boreča, Borháza, Borecsa
- Borejci, Borhida
- Bratonci, Murabaráti
- Brezovci, Vasnyíres
- Brezovica, Lendvanyíres
- Budinci, Bűdfalva, Büdincz
- Bukovnica, Bakónak
- Cankova, Vashidegkút
- Celje, Cille
- Čentiba, Csente
- Čepinci, Kerkafő, Csöpincz
- Černelavci, Kisszombat
- Čikečka vas, Csekefa
- Črenšovci, Cserföld, Cserensócz
- Dankovci, Őrfalu, Dankóc
- Dobrovnik, Dobronak
- Dokležovje, Murahely
- Dolenci, Nagydolány, Dolincz
- Dolga Vas, Hosszúfalu
- Dolgovaške Gorice, Hosszúfaluhegy
- Dolič, Völgyköz, Dolics
- Dolina, Völgyes
- Dolina pri Lendavi, Völgyifalu
- Dolnja Bistrica, Alsóbeszterce
- Dolnji Lakoš, Alsólakos
- Dolnji Slaveči, Alsócsalogány, Alsószlavecsa
- Domajinci, Dombalja
- Domanjševci, Domonkosfa
- Filovci, Filóc
- Fikšinci, Kismáriahavas, Füksincz
- Fokovci, Úrdomb
- Gaberje, Gyertyános, Zalagyertyános
- Gančani, Lendvarózsavölgy, Gancsán
- Gederovci, Kőhida, Gederócz
- Genterovci, Göntérháza
- Gerlinci, Görhegy, Görlincz
- Gibina, Murafüred
- Gomilica, Lendvaszentjózsef
- Gorica, Halmosfő
- Gornja Bistrica, Felsőbeszterce
- Gornji Črnci, Királyszék, Felsőcsernecz
- Gornji Lakoš, Felsőlakos
- Gornji Petrovci, Péterhegy, Felsőpetrócz
- Gornji Slaveči, Felsőcsalogány, Felsőszlavecsa
- Grad, Felsőlendva
- Gradišče, Muravárhely
- Hodoš, Őrihodos
- Hotiza, Murarév, Hotiza
- Ivanci, Zalaivánd, Iváncz
- Ivanjševci, Jánosfa
- Ivanovci, Alsószentbenedek, Ivanócz
- Ižakovci, Murasziget
- Kamovci, Kámaháza
- Kančevci, Felsőszentbenedek, Kancsócz
- Kapca, Kapca
- Kobilje, Kebeleszentmárton
- Korovci, Károlyfa
- Košarovci, Kosárháza
- Kot, Kót
- Kovačevci, Vaskovácsi
- Krajna, Véghely
- Kramarovci, Határfalva
- Krašči, Lendvakirályfa
- Križevci, Tótkeresztúr
- Krnci, Lendvakislak
- Krog, Korong
- Krplivnik, Kapornak
- Kruplivnik, Vaskorpád
- Kukeč, Újkökényes
- Kupšinci, Murahalmos
- Kuštanovci, Gesztenyés
- Kuzma, Kuzma
- Lemerje, Lehomér
- Lendava, Alsólendva
- Lendavske Gorice, Lendvahegy
- Lipa, Kislippa
- Lipovci, Hársliget
- Lončarovci, Gerőháza, Gerencserócz
- Lucova, Lakháza
- Lukačevci, Lukácsfa
- Mačkovci, Mátyásdomb, Macskócz
- Mala Polana, Kispalina
- Mali Dolenci, Kisdolány, Kisdolincz
- Markišavci, Márkusháza
- Markovci, Marokrét, Markócz
- Martinje, Magasfok, Martinya
- Martjanci, Mártonhely, Martyáncz
- Matjaševci, Szentmátyás, Matyasócz
- Melinci, Muramelence
- Mladetinci, Málnás, Mladetincz
- Mlajtinci, Kismálnás
- Moravske Toplice, Alsómarác
- Moščanci, Musznya
- Mostje, Lendava, Hídvég
- Motovilci, Mottolyád
- Motvarjevci, Szentlászló, Szécsiszentlászló
- Murska Sobota, Muraszombat
- Murski Črnci, Muracsermely, Muracsernec
- Murski Petrovci, Murapetróc
- Nedelica, Zorkóháza
- Nemčavci, Lendvanemesd
- Neradnovci, Nádorfa, Neradnócz
- Noršinci, Újtölgyes, Norsincz
- Novi Beznovci, Borostyán
- Nuskova, Dióslak
- Ocinje, Gedőudvar
- Odranci, Adorjánfalva
- Otovci, Ottóháza
- Panovci, Úriszék
- Pečarovci, Szentsebestyén
- Pertoča, Perestó, Pertocsa
- Peskovci, Petőfa
- Petanjci, Szécsénykút, Petáncz
- Petišovci, Petesháza
- Pince, Pince
- Pince-Marof, Pincemajor
- Polana, Vaspolony
- Pordašinci, Kisfalu
- Poznanovci, Pálhegy
- Predanovci, Rónafő
- Prosečka vas, Kölesvölgy
- Prosenjakovci, Pártosfalva
- Puconci, Battyánd, Pucincz
- Puževci, Pálmafa
- Radmožanci, Radamos
- Radovci, Radófa
- Rakičan, Battyánfalva, Rakicsán
- Rankovci, Ferenclak
- Ratkovci, Rátkalak
- Razkrižje, Ráckanizsa
- Renkovci, Lendvaerdő
- Rogašovci, Szarvaslak, Rogasócz
- Ropoča, Rétállás, Ropocsa
- Šafarsko, Ligetfalva
- Šalamenci, Salamon, Salamoncz
- Šalovci, Sal
- Satahovci, Muraszentes
- Sebeborci, Szentbibor
- Selo, Nagytótlak
- Serdica, Seregháza
- Skakovci, Szécsényfa
- Sodišinci, Bírószék, Szodesincz
- Sotina, Hegyszoros, Szotina
- Središče, Moravske Toplice, Szerdahely
- Srednja Bistrica, Középbeszterce
- Stanjevci, Kerkaszabadhegy
- Strehovci, Őrszentvid, Sztrelecz
- Strukovci, Sűrűház, Strukócz
- Suhi Vrh, Szárazhegy
- Šulinci, Sándorvölgy, Sülincz
- Sveti Jurij, Vízlendva, Szentgyörgy
- Tešanovci, Mezővár
- Tišina, Csendlak, Tissina
- Topolovci, Jegenyés
- Trdkova, Türke
- Trimlini, Hármasmalom
- Trnje, Tüskeszer
- Tropovci, Murafüzes
- Turnišče, Bántornya, Turniscsa
- Vadarci, Tiborfa, Tivadarcz
- Vanča vas, Ivánfalva
- Vaneča, Vaslak, Vanecsa
- Večeslavci, Vasvecsés
- Velika Polana, Nagypalina
- Veščica, Végfalva
- Veščica pri Murski Soboti, Falud
- Vidonci, Vidorlak, Vidoncz
- Vučja Gomila, Zsidahegy
- Ženavlje, Gyanafa
- Zenkovci, Zoltánháza
- Žitkovci, Zsitkóc
- Žižki, Zsizsekszer

== See also ==
- Hungarian exonyms
