= List of cities, towns, and villages in Slovenia: I =

This is a list of cities, towns, and villages in Slovenia, starting with I.

Settlement	Municipality
Idrija pri Bači	Tolmin
Idrija	Idrija
Idrijska Bela	Idrija
Idrijske Krnice	Idrija
Idrijski Log	Idrija
Idrsko	Kobarid
Idršek	Idrija
Ig	Ig
Iga vas	Loška Dolina
Iglenik pri Veliki Loki	Trebnje
Iglenik	Novo mesto
Ihan	Domžale
Ihova	Benedikt
Ilirska Bistrica	Ilirska Bistrica
Iljaševci	Križevci
Ilovca	Vojnik
Ilovci	Ljutomer
Ilovka	Kranj
Imenje	Brda
Imenje	Moravče
Imenje	Šentjernej
Imeno	Podčetrtek
Imenska Gorca	Podčetrtek
Imovica	Lukovica
Irje	Rogaška Slatina
Iška Loka	Ig
Iška vas	Ig
Iška	Ig
Ivanci	Moravske Toplice
Ivančna Gorica	Ivančna Gorica
Ivandol	Krško
Ivanje Selo	Cerknica
Ivanji Grad	Komen
Ivanjkovci	Ormož
Ivanjski Vrh	Cerkvenjak
Ivanjski Vrh	Gornja Radgona
Ivanjše	Krško
Ivanjševci ob Ščavnici	Gornja Radgona
Ivanjševci	Moravske Toplice
Ivanjševski Vrh	Gornja Radgona
Ivanovci	Moravske Toplice
Ivenca	Vojnik
Izgorje	Žiri
Izlake	Zagorje ob Savi
Izola	Izola
Izvir	Brežice
Ižakovci	Beltinci
