= Balázs Berke =

Slovene poet, writer and Lutheran priest

Balázs Berke (Slovene: Balaž Berke) was a Slovene poet, writer, and Lutheran priest in Hungary, in the Slovene March (today Prekmurje and Vendvidék).

Born was in Kančevci in 1754 to the petty noble family which belonged to the local gentry. He studied in Wittenberg in Saxony, and in 1782 he returned to Hungary. He worked in Puconci, Surd, and Nemespátró, and then in 1803 in Hodoš. He married noblewoman Rosalia Gyenesse (Jenesse) with which he had multiple children. The fact that count Maximilian Batthyany was the godfather of Berkes children, it may be presumed that he was very respected man in the community. He died in Nemespátró around 1821.

Berke wrote the Latin book Ode Saphica honori ac venerationi Adami Farkas solemnia suis nominis celebrantis (a commemoration of the poet Ádám Farkas) and a hymnal in the Prekmurje Slovene titled Szlovenszke Dühovne peszmi (Slovene Hymns, 1768–1769).

== Sources ==
- Szinnyei József: MAGYAR ÍRÓK ÉLETE ÉS MUNKÁI
- Nemespártói Evangélikus Egyházközség
- Vilko Novak: Martjanska pesmarica, ZALOŽBA ZRC. Ljubljana 1997. ISBN 961-6182-27-7

== See also ==
- List of Slovene writers and poets in Hungary
