= Hungarian exonyms =

Below is a list of Hungarian language exonyms for places outside of Hungary. It excludes transliterations with the same pronunciation as the endonym, and place names spelled the same.

== Albania ==
Albania
English name	Hungarian name	Endonym		Notes
English name	Hungarian name	Name	Language	Notes
Tirana	Tirana	Tiranë	Albanian	
Durrës	Duránc			
Vlorë	Valóna			
Shkodër	Kadar			

== Austria ==
For a list of Hungarian place names in the Burgenland region of Austria, see : Hungarian exonyms (Burgenland)

Austria
English name	Hungarian name	Endonym		Notes
English name	Hungarian name	Name	Language	Notes
Vienna	Bécs	Wien	German	
Deutschkreutz	Sopronkeresztúr			
Eisenstadt	Kismarton			
Fürstenfeld	Fölöstöm			
Güssing	Németújvár			
Graz	Grác			
Carinthia	Karintia	Kärnten	German	federal state
Lower Austria	Alsó-Ausztria	Niederösterreich	German	federal state
Mattersburg	Nagymarton			
Upper Austria	Felső-Ausztria	Oberösterreich	German	federal state
Oberpullendorf	Felsőpulya			
Oberwart	Felsőőr			
Styria	Stájerország	Steiermark	German	federal state
Wiener Neustadt	Bécsújhely			
Seckau	Szék			
Schwarzenbach	Feketevár			
Bad Radkersburg	Regede			

== Belgium ==
Belgium
English name	Hungarian name	Endonym		Notes
English name	Hungarian name	Name	Language	Notes
Brussels	Brüsszel	Brussel	Dutch	
Brussels	Brüsszel	Bruxelles	French	

== Bosnia-Herzegovina ==
Bosnia & Herzegovina
Bosnian place	Hungarian name	Endonym		Notes
Bosnian place	Hungarian name	Name	Language	Notes
Sarajevo	Szarajevó			
Banja Luka	Orbászvár, Bánréte			
Bosanska Gradiška	Orbászkővár			
Tuzla	Só			Dated
Brčko	Barkaszád			
Bihać	Bihács			
Kozarska Dubica	Dubica			
Bosanska Krupa	Krupa			
Velika Kladuša	Nagykladusa			
Sanski Most	Szanahida			
Novi Grad	Szanaújvár			
Brod	Törökrév			
Srebrenik	Zebernek			

== Bulgaria ==
Bulgaria
English name	Hungarian name	Endonym		Notes
English name	Hungarian name	Name	Language	Notes
Nikopol	Nikápoly			
Pazardzhik	Tatárpazardzsik			
Pleven	Plevna			
Plovdiv	Filippopoly, Filipápoly			
Ruse	Oroszcsík			
Silistra	Durosztol			
Sofia	Szeredőc	Sofiya	Bulgarian	
Stara Zagora	Ózagra			
Veliko Tarnovo	Tövisvár			
Vidin	Bodony			

== China ==
China
English name	Hungarian name	Endonym		Notes
English name	Hungarian name	Name	Language	Notes
Shanghai	Sanghaj	上海	Chinese	
Beijing	Pejcsing, Peking	北京	Chinese	
Tianjin	Tiencsin	天津	Chinese	
Guangzhou	Kuangcsou, Kanton	广州	Chinese	
Shenzhen	Sencsen	深圳	Chinese	
Wuhan	Vuhan	武汉	Chinese	
Dongguan	Tungkuan	东莞	Chinese	
Chengdu	Csengtu	成都	Chinese	
Chongqing	Csungcsing, Csungking	重庆	Chinese	
Nanjing	Nancsing, Nanking	南京	Chinese	
Xi'an	Hszian	西安	Chinese	
Shenyang	Senjang	沈阳	Chinese	
Hangzhou	Hangcsou	杭州	Chinese	
Suzhou	Szucsou	苏州	Chinese	
Qingdao	Csingtao	青岛	Chinese	

== Croatia ==
For Hungarian place names in Croatia see: List of Hungarian exonyms for places in Croatia

Croatia
Croatian place	Hungarian name	Endonym		Notes
Croatian place	Hungarian name	Name	Language	Notes
Zagreb	Zágráb			
Beli Manastir	Pélmonostor			
Bjelovar	Belovár			
Čakovec	Csáktornya			
Đakovo	Diakovár			
Dubrovnik	Ragúza			
Đurđevac	Szentgyörgy			
Erdut	Erdőd			
Ilok	Újlak			
Karlovac	Károlyváros			
Koprivinica	Kapronca			
Križevci	Körös			
Mursko Središće	Muraszerdahely			
Optija	Abbázia			
Osijek	Eszék			
Osijek	Osziék			
Otočac	Otocsán			
Ozalj	Ozaly			
Prelog	Perlak			
Pula	Póla			
Rijeka	Fiume			
Sisak	Sziszek			
Slavonski Brod	Bród			
Slunj	Szluin			
Trogir	Trau			
Valpovo	Valpó			
Varaždin	Varasd			
Vinkovci	Vinkovce			
Virovitica	Verőce			
Vukovar	Valkóvár			Dated
Zadar	Zára			
Daruvar	Daruvár			
Gospić	Goszpics			
Ivanec	Ivánc			
Velika Gorica	Nagygorica			
Našice	Nekcse			
Samobor	Szamobor			
Knin	Tenén			
Biograd na Moru	Tengerfehérvár			
Senj	Zengg			

== Cuba ==
Cuba
English name	Hungarian name	Endonym		Notes
English name	Hungarian name	Name	Language	Notes
Havana	Havanna	La Habana	Spanish	

== Czech Republic ==
Czechia
English name	Hungarian name	Endonym		Notes
English name	Hungarian name	Name	Language	Notes
Brno	Berén, Börénvásár, Börön, Brünn			
Hradec Králové	Királyvárad, Királygréce			
Hustopeče	Pusztapécs			
Moravia	Morvaország	Morava	Czech	
Nelahozeves	Nelahozéves			
Olomouc	Alamóc			
Prague	Prága	Praha	Czech	
Zlín	Oláhföld			
Uherské Hradiště	Magyarhradis			
Karlovy Vary	Károlyfürdő	Karlovy Vary	Czech	
Uherský Brod	Magyarbród			
Uherský Ostroh	Magyarsárvár			
Valašské Meziříčí	Oláhmezerics			
Slavkov u Brna	Szalók			
Ždánice	Zsadány			
Kyjov	Kíjó			
Staré Město	Morvaóvár			
Bánov	Bán			
Boršice u Blatnice	Bors			
Valašské Klobouky	Oláhsüveges			
Veselí nad Moravou	Veszel			
Hodonín	Gödöny			
Mikulov	Miklósvár			
Klobouky u Brna	Süveges			
Rožnov pod Radhoštěm	Rozsnyó			
Vsetín	Vesztény			
Bystřice pod Hostýnem	Gesztbeszterce			
Hustopeče	Pusztapécs			
Vyškov	Visk			
Havlíčkův Brod	Németbród			
Jablunkov	Jablunka			

== Cyprus ==
Cyprus
English name	Hungarian name	Endonym		Notes
English name	Hungarian name	Name	Language	Notes
Limassol	Limasszol	Lemesós	Greek	
Limassol	Limasszol	Limasol	Turkish	
Nicosia	Nicosia	Lefkoşa	Turkish	
Nicosia	Nicosia	Levkosía	Greek	

== Denmark ==
Denmark
English name	Hungarian name	Endonym		Notes
English name	Hungarian name	Name	Language	Notes
Copenhagen	Koppenhága	København	Danish	

== France ==
France
English name	Hungarian name	Endonym		Notes
English name	Hungarian name	Name	Language	Notes
Nice	Nizza			
Paris	Párizs			
Seine	Szajna			river

== Germany ==
Germany
English name	Hungarian name	Endonym		Notes
English name	Hungarian name	Name	Language	Notes
Augsburg	Ágosta			dated
Bavaria	Bajorország	Bayern	German	
Bremen	Bréma			
Dresden	Drezda			
Germany	Németország	Deutschland	German	country
Lower Saxony	Alsó-Szászország	Niedersachsen	German	state
Leipzig	Lipcse			
Cologne	Kolonya	Köln	German	dated
Main	Majna			river
Mecklenburg-Vorpommern	Mecklenburg-Elő-Pomeránia			state
North Rhine-Westphalia	Észak-Rajna-Vesztfália	Nordrhein-Westfalen	German	state
Prussia	Poroszország	Preußen	German	historical state
Rhine	Rajna	Rhein	German	river
Rhineland-Palatinate	Rajna-vidék-Pfalz	Rheinland-Pfalz	German	state
Saarland	Saar-vidék			state
Saxony	Szászország	Sachsen	German	state
Saxony	Szászország	Sakska	Upper Sorbian	state
Saxony-Anhalt	Szász-Anhalt	Sachsen-Anhalt	German	state
Thuringia	Thüringia	Thüringen	German	state

== Greece ==
Greece
English name	Hungarian name	Endonym	Notes
Athens	Athén	Athína (Αθήνα)	
Greece	Görögország	Elláda (Ελλάδα)	country
Corfu	Korfu	Kérkyra (Κέρκυρα)	
Crete	Kréta	Kríti (Κρήτη)	
Thessaloniki	Szaloniki	Thessaloníki (Θεσσαλονίκη)	

== Italy ==
Italy
English name	Hungarian name	Endonym		Notes
English name	Hungarian name	Name	Language	Notes
Italy	Olaszország	Italia	Italian	country
Rome	Róma	Roma	Italian	
Milan	Milánó	Milano	Italian	
Naples	Nápoly	Napoli	Italian	
Venice	Velence	Venezia	Italian	
Genova	Génua	Genoa	Italian	dated

== Moldova ==
Moldova
Moldovan place	Hungarian name	Endonym	Notes
Chișinău	Kisinyov, Kisjenő		
Cioburciu	Csöbörcsök, Töbörcsök		
Bălţi	Belc		
Orhei	Várhely, Őrhely		

== Netherlands ==
Netherlands
English name	Hungarian name	Endonym	Notes
Amsterdam	Amszterdam		
The Hague	Hága	Den Haag	
Frisia	Frízföld	Friesland, Fryslân	province and cultural region
Leiden	Lejda		dated

== Poland ==
Poland
English name	Hungarian name	Endonym	Notes
Kraków	Krakkó		
Gdańsk	Dancka		dated
Poland	Lengyelország	Polska	country
Sącz	Szandec		
Stary Sącz	Ószandec		
Nowy Sącz	Újszandec		
Warsaw	Varsó	Warszawa	
Wrocław	Boroszló		dated
Bystrzyca Górna	Felsőbeszterce		dated
Bytom	Bitony		dated
Częstochowa	Csensztokó		dated
Włocławek	Ladiszló		dated
Jarosław	Iroszló		dated
Opole	Opoly		dated
Płock	Palacka		dated
Piotrków Trybunalski	Petrikó		dated
Sandomierz	Szondamér		dated
Tarnów	Tarnó		dated
Cieszyn	Tessény		dated
Toruń	Toronya		dated

== Portugal ==
Portugal
English name	Hungarian name	Endonym	Notes
Lisbon	Lisszabon	Lisboa	

== Romania ==
Romania
English name	Hungarian name	Endonym		Notes
English name	Hungarian name	Name	Language	Notes
Bucharest	Bukarest	București	Romanian	
Buzău	Bodzavásár			
Câmpulung	Hosszúmező			
Curtea de Argeș	Argyasudvarhely			
Drobeta-Turnu Severin	Szörényvár			
Focșani	Foksány			
Galați	Galac			
Giurgiu	Gyurgyevó			
Iași	Jászvásár			
Piatra Neamț	Karácsonkő, Németkő			
Rădăuți	Radóc			
Sibiu	Nagyszeben			
Siret	Szeretvásár			
Suceava	Szusáva			
Târgu Frumos	Szépváros, Szépvásár			
Târgu Jiu	Zsilvásárhely			
Târgu Neamț	Németvásár			
Transylvania	Erdély	Ardeal, Transilvania	Romanian	
Turnu Măgurele	Kisnikápoly			
Vatra Dornei	Dornavátra			
Vaslui	Vászló			
Wallachia	Havasalföld, Oláhország	Țara Românească, Valahia	Romanian	
Târgu Ocna	Aknavásár			
Răcăciuni	Alsórekecsin			
Bacău	Bákó			
Bârlad	Barlád			
Bicaz	Békás			
Cotnari	Kotnár			
Craiova	Krajova			
Crăcăoani	Krakkó			
Crasna	Kraszna			
Moineşti	Molnosd			
Baia	Moldvabánya			
Câmpulung Moldovenesc	Moldvahosszúmező			
Botoşani	Botosvásár			
Dărmăneşi	Dormánfalva			
Vatra Dornei	Dornavátra			
Dorohoi	Dorohoj			
Adjud	Egyedhalma			
Fălticeni	Folticsén			
Faraoani	Forrófalva			
Bumbeşti-Jiu	Gombos			
Hârlău	Harló			
Gura Humorului	Homorószád			
Huşi	Huszváros			
Călimaneşti	Kelemenháza			
Novaci	Nováki			
Oneşti	Ónfalva			
Rădăuţi	Radóc			
Roman	Románvásár			
Slănic-Moldova	Szaláncfürdő			
Târgu Carbuneşti	Szénvásárhely			
Slatina	Szlatina			
Solca	Szolka			
Săveni	Szövén			
Tecuci	Tekécs			
Podu Turcului	Törökhida			

=== Transylvania ===
- Abram Érábrány
- Abrămuț Verdresábrány
- Abrud Abrudbánya
- Abrud-Sat Abrudfalva
- Abucea Abucsa
- Abud Székely abod
- Abuș Abosfalva
- Acățari Ákosfalva
- Aciliu Ecsellő
- Aciua Balotafalu
- Aciuța Ácsfalva
- Aciș Ákos
- Acmariu Akmár
- Adalin Adalin
- Adămuș Ádámos
- Adea Ágya
- Adoni Éradony
- Adrian Görgényadorján
- Adrian 2 Adorján
- Adrianu Mare Nagyadorján
- Adrianu Mic Kisadorján
- Ady Endre Érmindszent
- Agadici Agadics
- Aghireș Egrespatak
- Aghireșu Egeres
- Agîrbiciu Egerbegy
- Agîrbiciu 2 Szászegerbegy
- Agnita Szentágota
- Agrieș Egreshely
- Agrij Felsőegregy
- Agriș Ruhaegres
- Agriș 2 Egri
- Agrișteu Egrestő
- Agrișu de Jos Alsóegres
- Agrișu de Sus Felsőegres
- Agrișu Mare Almásegres
- Agrișu Mic Bélegregy
- Aita Mare Nagyajta
- Aita Medie Középajta
- Aita Seacă Szárazajta
- Aiton Ajton
- Aiud Nagyenyed
- Aiudul de Sus Felenyed
- Alămor Alamor
- Albac Fehérvölgy
- Alba Iulia Gyulafehérvár
- Albești Fehéklak
- Albești 2 Fehéregyháza
- Albeștii Bistriței Kisfehéregyház
- Albiș Albis
- Albiș 2 Kézdialbis
- Aldea Abásfalva
- Aldești Áldófalva
- Alecuș Elekes
- Aleșd Élesd
- Aleuș Elyüs
- Alexandrița Sándortelke
- Aliceni Kistartolc
- Alioș Temesillésd
- Alma Küküllőalmás
- Almaș Háromalmás
- Almaș-Săliște Almásszelistye
- Almașu Váralmás
- Almașu de Mijloc Középalmás
- Almașu Mare Kozmaalmás
- Almașu Mare 2 Nagyalmás
- Almașu Mic Szalárdalmás
- Almașu Mic 2 Keresztényalmás
- Almașu Mic de Munte Kasalmás
- Almașu Sec Szárazalmás
- Alma Vii Szászalmád
- Almășel Almasel
- Alparea Váradalpár
- Altringen Kisrékas
- Alțina Alcina
- Alun Álun
- Alun 2 Álun
- Alungeni Futásfalva
- Aluniș Cseralja
- Aluniș 2 Kecsed
- Aluniș 3 Székelymagyaros
- Aluniș 4 Magyaró
- Aluniș 5 Szamosszéplak
- Alunișu Magyarókereke
- Alunișul Gaurény
- Amați Amac
- Ambud Ombod
- Ampoița Kisompoly
- Andreeni Magyarandrásfalva
- Andreneasa Andrenyásza
- Andrid Érendréd
- Angheluș Angyalos
- Anieș Dombhát
- Anina Stájerlakanina
- Aninoasa Aninoszabányatelep
- Aninoasa 2 Egerpatak
- Ant Ant
- Antăș Antos
- Apa Apa
- Apadia Apádia
- Apahida Apahida
- Apalina Abafája
- Apateu Oláhapáti
- Apateu 2 Apáti
- Apateu 3 Dobrácsapáti
- Apatiu Dellőapáti
- Apața Apáca
- Apold Apold
- Apoldu de Jos Kisapold
- Apoldu de Sus Nagyapold
- Apoș Szászapátfalva
- Araci Arapatak
- Arad Arad
- Arăneag Székesaranyág
- Arănieș Aranyos
- Arcalia Árokalja
- Archia Árki
- Archid Szilágyerked
- Archiș Bélárkos
- Archita Erked
- Archiud Mezőerked
- Arcuș Árkos
- Ardan Árdány
- Ardeova Erdőfalva
- Ardeu Erdőfalva
- Ardud Erdőd
- Ardusat Erdőszáda
- Arduzel Szamosardó
- Arghișu Argyas
- Arieșeni Lepus
- Arieșu de Cîmp Mezőaranyos
- Arieșu de Pădure Erdőaranyos
- Arini Lüget
- Ariniș Égerhát
- Ariușd Erősd
- Armășeni Csikménaság
- Armășenii Noi Ménaságújfalu
- Armeni Örményszékes
- Armeniș Örményes
- Arpașu de Jos Alsóárpás
- Arpașu de Sus Felsőárpás
- Arpășel Arpad
- Aruncuta Aranykút
- Arvățeni Árvátfalva
- Asinip Asszonynépe
- Asuaju de Jos Alsószivágy
- Asuaju de Sus Felsőszivágy
- Așchileu (Așchileu Mare) Nagyesküllő
- Așchileu Mic Kisesküllő
- Aștileu Esküllő
- Atea Atya
- Ateaș Atyás
- Atia Atyha
- Atid Etéd
- Ațel Ecel
- Ațințis Cintos
- Augustin Ágostonfalva
- Aurel Vlaicu Bencenc
- Aușeu Kisősi
- Avram Iancu Ácsva
- Avram Iancu 2 Keménytok
- Avrămești Szentábrahám
- Avrig Felek
- Axente Sever Asszonyfalva
- Baba Bába
- Babșa Babsa
- Babța Bábca
- Bacău de Mijloc Bakamező
- Bacea Bácsfalva
- Baciu Kisbács
- Bacova Bakóvár
- Badon Bádon
- Bahnea Bonyha
- Baia Kisbaja
- Baia Borșa Borsabánya
- Baia de Arieș Aranyosbánya
- Baia de Criș Körösbánya
- Baia Mare Nagybánya
- Baia Sprie Felsőbánya
- Baica Bányika
- Balc Bályok
- Balda Bald
- Baldovin Báldovin
- Balinț Bálinc
- Balomir Balomir
- Balomiru de Cîmp Balomir
- Baloșești Bégabalázsd / Balosest
- Balșa Balsa
- Ban Felsőbán
- Bancu Csikbánkfalva
- Band Mezőbánd
- Banloc Bánlak
- Banpotoc Bánpatak
- Bara Barafalva
- Baraolt Barót
- Barbura Barbura
- Barcani Zágonbárkány
- Baru Nagybár
- Baștea Bástya
- Bata Batta
- Batár Feketebátor
- Batin Bátony
- Batiz Batiz
- Batoș Bátos
- Băbășești Szamosberence
- Băbdiu Zápróc
- Băbeni Aranymező
- Băbești Kisbábony
- Băbiu Bábony
- Băbuțiu Báboc
- Băcăinți Bokajafalu
- Băcel Kökösbácstelek
- Băcia Bácsi
- Băciia Bakonya
- Bădăcin Szilágybadacsony
- Bădeni Bágyon
- Bădeni 2 Bágy
- Bădești Bádok
- Băgaciu Kisbogács
- Băgaciu 2 Szászbogács
- Băgara Bogártelke
- Băgău Magyarbagó
- Băiești Bajesd
- Băile 1 Mai Püspökfürdő
- Băile Bixad Bikszádfürdő
- Băile Bálványos Bálványosfüred
- Băile Chirui Kérulyfürdő
- Băile Felix Félixfürdő
- Băile Herculane Herkulesfürdő
- Băile Homorod Homoródfürdő
- Băile Lipova Lippafüred
- Băile Puturoasa Büdössárfürdő
- Băile Șugaș Sugásfürdő
- Băile Tinca Tenkefürdő
- Băile Turda Tordafürdő
- Băile Tușnad Tusnádfürdő
- Băișoara Járabánya
- Cluj-Napoca Kolozsvár
- Băița Rézbánya
- Târgu Mureș Marosvásárhely

== Russia ==
Russia
English name	Hungarian name	Endonym		Notes
English name	Hungarian name	Name	Language	Notes
Saint Petersburg	Szentpétervár	Санкт-Петербург (Sankt-Peterburg)	Russian	
Moscow	Moszkva	Москва́ (Moskvá)	Russian	
Russia	Oroszország	Росси́я (Rossíya)	Russian	country

== Serbia ==
For a list of Hungarian place names in the Vojvodina Region, see : Hungarian exonyms (Vojvodina)

Serbia
English name	Hungarian name	Endonym		Notes
English name	Hungarian name	Name	Language	Notes
Bečej	Óbecse			
Bela Crkva	Fehértemplom			
Belgrade	Belgrád, Nándorfehérvár	Beograd	Serbian	Dated
Kikinda	Nagykikinda			
Kosovo Polje	Rigómező			Dated
Novi Sad	Újvidék			
Novi Pazar	Újvásár			
Požarevac	Passaróc			
Šabac	Szabács			
Senta	Zenta			
Sombor	Zombor			
Smederevo	(Vég-)Szendrő			
Subotica	Szabadka			
Valjevo	Macsó, Valpó			Dated
Vršac	Versec			
Zrenjanin	Nagybecskerek			
Loznica	Drinavár			
Golubac	Galambóc			
Požarevac	Pozsaróc			
Sremska Mitrovica	Szávaszentdemeter, Szerémvár,			

== Slovakia ==
Slovakia
Slovakian place	Hungarian name	Endonym		Notes
Slovakian place	Hungarian name	Name	Language	Notes
Banská Bystrica	Besztercebánya			
Banská Štiavnica	Selmecbánya			
Bardejov	Bártfá			
Belá, Nové Zámky	Bála			
Belá, Žilina	Bella			
Bohatá	Bagota			
Bratislava	Pozsony			
Brezno	Breznóbánya			
Čadca	Csaca			
Detva	Dettva, Gyetva			
Dolný Kubín	Alsókubin			
Dunajská Streda	Dunaszerdahely			
Fil'akovo	Fülek			
Gabčíkovo	Bős			
Humenné	Homonna			
Hurbanovo	Ógyalla			
Kojatice	Kajáta			
Kolárovo	Gúta			
Komárno	Komárom			
Košice	Kassa			
Krupina	Korpona			
Levice	Léva			
Levoča	Lőcse			
Liptovský Mikuláš	Liptószentmiklós			
L'ubá	Libád			
Lučenec	Losonc			
Malacky	Malacka			
Martin	Turócszentmárton			
Michalovce	Nagymihály			
Moldava nad Bodvou	Szepsi			
Mošovce	Mosóc			
Nitra	Nyitra			
Nové Zámky	Érsekújvár			
Pezinok	Bazin			
Poprad	Poprád			
Považká Bystrica	Vágbeszterce			
Prešov	Eperjes			
Prievidza	Privigye			
Radzovce	Ragyolc			
Revúca	Rőce, Nagyrőce			
Rimavská Sobota	Rimaszombat			
Rožňava	Rozsnyó			
Ružomberok	Rózsahegy			
Šahy	Ság, Ipolyság			
Šal'a	Sellye, Vágsellye			
Šamorín	Somorja			
Senec	Szenc			
Štúrovo	Párkány			
Svidník	Felsvízköz			
Telgárt	Garamfő			
Trebišov	Tőketerebes			
Trnava	Nagtszombat			
Trenčín	Trencsén			
Turiec	Turóc			
Vel'ky Krtíš	Nagykürtös			
Víťaz	Nagyvitéz			
Vranov nad Topl'ou	Varannó			
Zlaté Moravce	Aranyosmarót			
Zvolen	Zólyom			
Želiezovce	Zselíz			
Žilina	Zsolna			

== Slovenia ==
For a list of Hungarian place names in the Prekmurje region, see: Hungarian exonyms (Prekmurje, Slovenia)

Slovenia
English name	Hungarian name	Endonym		Notes
English name	Hungarian name	Name	Language	Notes
Celje	Cille, Cilli	Celje		
Lendava	Lendva	Lendava		
Murska Sobota	Muraszombat	Murska Sobota		
Ormož	Ormosd	Ormož		
Ptuj	Potony	Ptuj		
Rakičan	Battyánfalva	Rakičan		
Gornja Radgona	Felsőregede			
Krško	Kőrös			
Gabrije	Zalagyertyános			
Maribor	Gyepűvár			

== South Africa ==
South Africa
English name	Hungarian name	Endonym		Notes
English name	Hungarian name	Name	Language	Notes
Cape Town	Fokváros	Kaapstad	Afrikaans	

== Turkey ==
Turkey
English name	Hungarian name	Endonym		Notes
English name	Hungarian name	Name	Language	Notes
Edirne	Drinápoly			
İstanbul	Konstantinápoly (Isztambul)			Dated
Tekirdag	Rodostó			

== United Kingdom ==
United Kingdom
English name	Hungarian name	Endonym		Notes
English name	Hungarian name	Name	Language	Notes
Thames	Temze			river

== Ukraine ==
Ukraine
English name	Hungarian name	Endonym		Notes
English name	Hungarian name	Name	Language	Notes
Berehove	Beregszász	Berehove		
Bilhorod-Dnistrovskyi	Nyeszterfehérvár	Bilhorod-Dnistrovskyi		
Chop	Csap	Chop		
Khust	Huszt	Khust		
Kyiv	Kijev	Kyiv		
Lviv	Ilyvó, Lemberg	Lviv		
Mukachevo	Munkács	Mukachevo		
Rakhiv	Rahó	Rakhiv		
Uzhhorod	Ungvár	Uzhhorod		
Vynohradiv	Nagyszőlős	Vynohradiv		
Chernivtsi	Csarnóca			
Staryi Sambir	Ószambor			
Sambir	Szambor			
Ivano-Frankivsk	Sztanyiszló			
Storozhynets	Őrvásár			

== See also ==
- List of European exonyms
