= Lopadea =

Lopadea may refer to one of two places in Alba County, Romania:

- Lopadea Nouă, a commune
- Lopadea Veche, a village in Mirăslău Commune
