= Ádám Farkas =

Ádám Farkas may refer to:

- Ádám Farkas (poet) (1730–1786), Lutheran priest and poet
- Adam Farkas (finance) (born 1968), chief executive of the Association for Financial Markets in Europe
- Ádám Farkas (footballer) (born 1987), Hungarian footballer
