= Ferenc Oslay =

Hungarian-Slovene historian, writer and propagandist

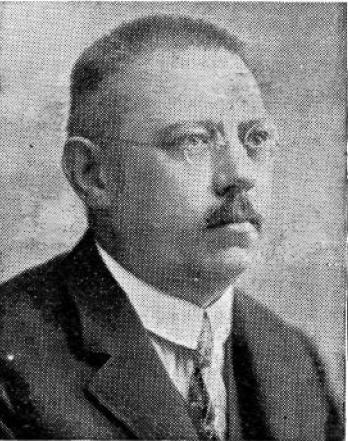
Oslay in the 1920s

Ferenc Oslay (Slovene: Franc Ošlaj, Prekmurje Slovene: Ferenc Ošlaj or Ošlay; September 22, 1883 – April 22, 1932) was a Hungarian-Slovene historian, writer, Trianon irredentist, and propagandist.

Born in Filovci to a minor noble family, Oslay attended elementary school in Puconci and received further education in Budapest. Oslay studied the Slovene March (Prekmurje) and contributed to Sándor Mikola's irredentist publication Domovina. Oslay's research topics were the history of Prekmurje, the local language, the Reformation, and Croatian history. Oslay made many claims that are untenable and unproveable, including that Styria was inhabited by Hungarians, and therefore Styria is also an ancient Hungarian area, or that the Slovenes in Prekmurje and Styria are assimilated Hungarians. Oslay supported the anti-Slavic chauvinistic propaganda of Sándor Mikola after World War I.

== Gallery ==
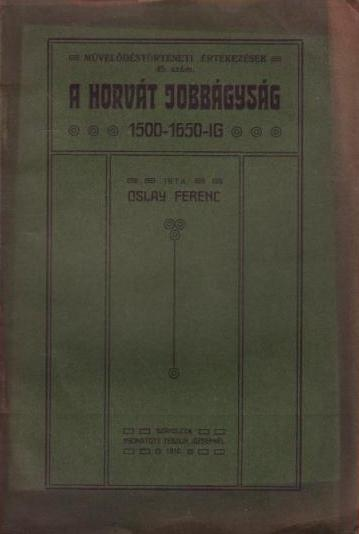
Oslay's 1910 book A horvát jobbágyság 1500–1650-ig (Croatian Serfdom, 1500–1650)

== See also ==
- List of Slovene writers and poets in Hungary
- Wendish question
