= Péter Kollár =

Slovenian writer and priest (1855–1908)

- Born: 18 June 1855; Ratkovci, Slovenia
- Died: 31 December 1908 (aged 53)
- Occupations: Priest; writer

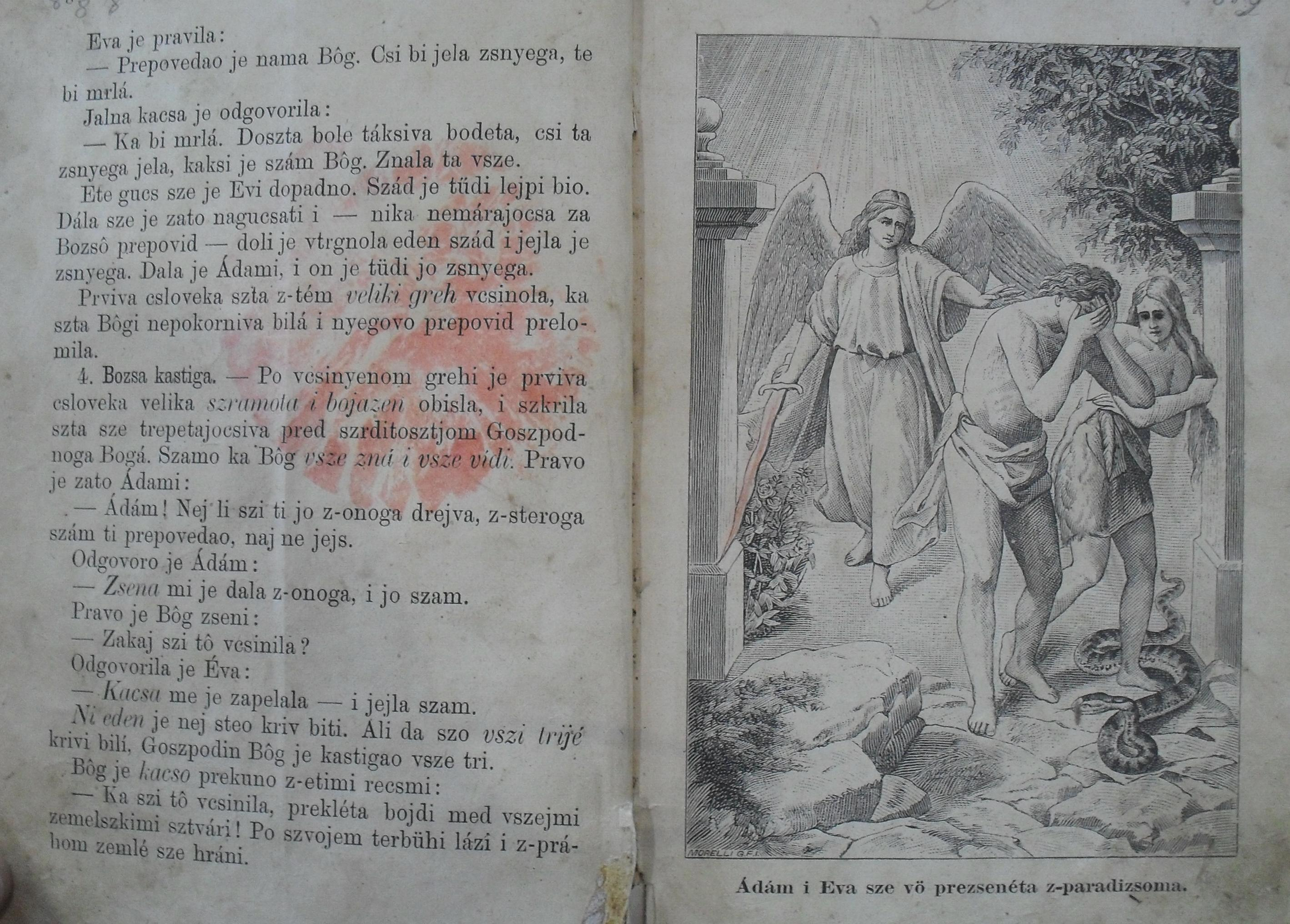
The Expulsion of Adam and Eve from Eden – the picture of Mála biblia z-kejpami (Small Bible with pictures) by Péter Kollár (1897).

Péter Kollár (Slovene Peter Kolar, 18 June 1855 – 31 December 1908) was a Hungarian Slovenian Roman Catholic priest and writer.

== Biography ==
Born in Ratkovci, Prekmurje, his parents were Péter Kollár and Judit Zselezen. He was ordained on 13 July 1882. He was a chaplain in Črenšovci until 1885 and later a parish clerk in Bogojina. From 1885 to 1887, he was a chaplain in Murska Sobota, after which he spent one year each in Beltinci and Turnišče. By 1900, he had become a priest in Beltinci.

== Works ==
- Mála biblia z-kejpami ali zgodba zvelicsanya za málo decsiczo : za I-II razréd normálszke sôle piszana po Gerely Józsefi; z-27 z-leszá pritisznyenimi kejpmi od G. Morelli. – Budapest, Szent István Társulat, 1897.
- Mála biblia z-kejpami ali zgodba zvelicsanya za málo decsiczo : za I-II razréd normálszke sôle piszana po Gerely Józsefi; z-27 z-leszá pritisznyenimi kejpmi od G. Morelli. – 2. natiszk. Budapest, Szent István Társulat, 1898.
- Návuk odpotrdjenyá ali férme. Z-vogrszkoga velikoga katekizmusa na sztári szlovenszki jezik obernyeni po Kollár Petri beltinszkom plebánusi 1902.

== See also ==
- List of Slovene writers and poets in Hungary
