= Berkovci =

Berkovci Berkovci pri Prosenjakovcih (after 1955), Berkeháza
- Location in Slovenia
- Coordinates: 46°45′7.98″N 16°17′32.39″E
- Country: Slovenia
- Traditional region: Prekmurje
- Statistical region: Mura
- Municipality: Moravske Toplice

Area
  - Total: 1.62 km^{2} (0.63 sq mi)
- Elevation: 249.4 m (818 ft)

Population (2002)
  - Total: 55

Berkovci (pronounced [ˈbeːɾkɔu̯tsi]; Hungarian: Berkeháza) is a settlement northwest of Prosenjakovci in the Municipality of Moravske Toplice in the Prekmurje region of Slovenia.

There is a small chapel in the settlement with a three-story belfry. It was built in 1913.

== Name ==
The name of the settlement was changed from Berkovci to Berkovci pri Prosenjakovcih in 1955. The name was later shortened to Berkovci.
