= Bukovnica =

Bukovnica Bükovnica
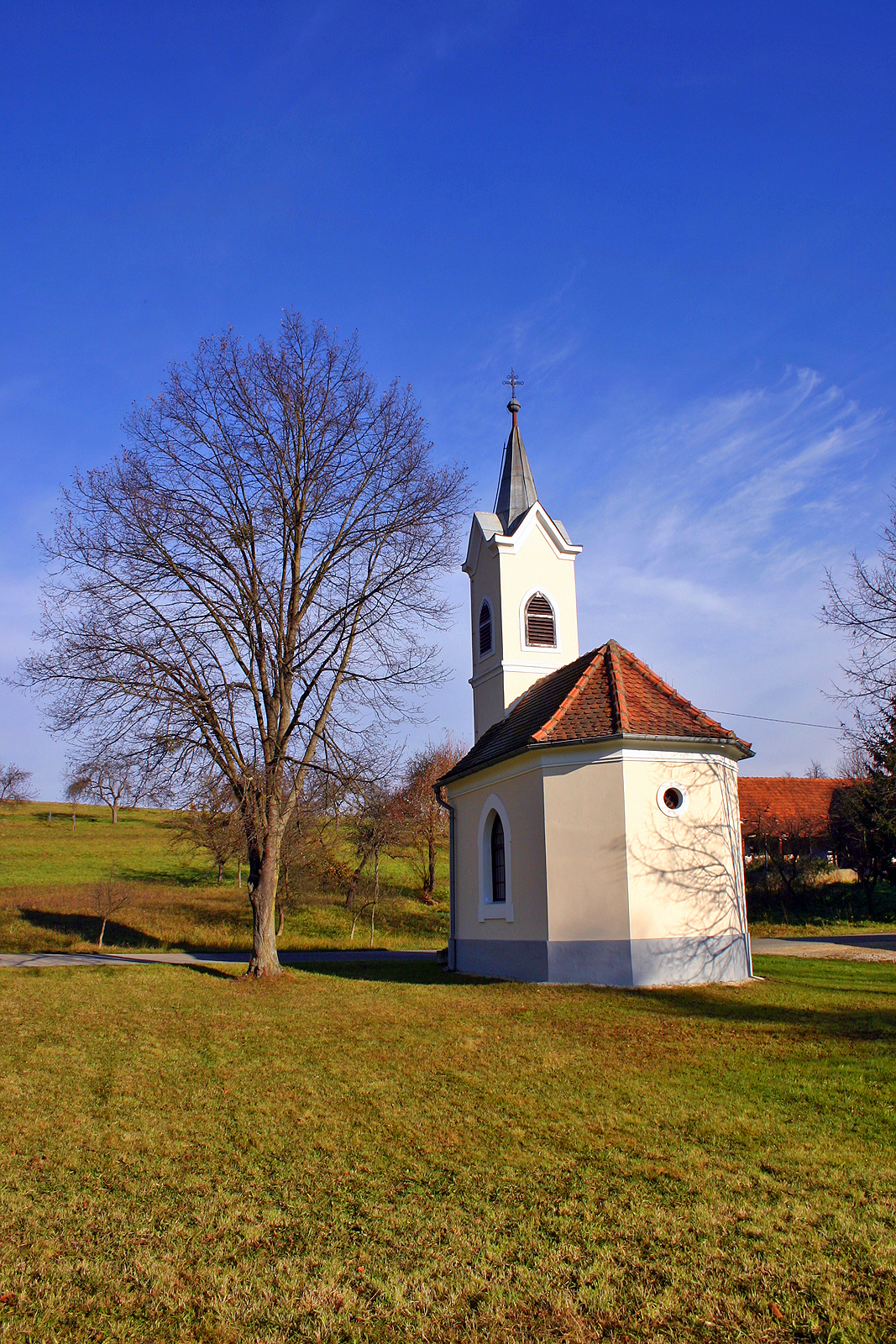
- Holy Cross Chapel, Bukovnica

- Location in Slovenia
- Coordinates: 46°41′29.68″N 16°19′25.31″E
- Country: Slovenia
- Traditional region: Prekmurje
- Statistical region: Mura
- Municipality: Moravske Toplice

Area
  - Total: 3.85 km^{2} (1.49 sq mi)
- Elevation: 204.8 m (672 ft)

Population (January 1, 2023)
  - Total: 43

Bukovnica (pronounced [ˈbuːkɔu̯nitsa]; Hungarian: Bakónak, Prekmurje Slovene: Bükovnica) is a village northeast of Bogojina in the Municipality of Moravske Toplice in the Prekmurje region of Slovenia.

There is a small chapel on the western outskirts of the settlement dedicated to the Holy Cross.

== Bibliography ==
- Stanonik, Marija (2017). Škofic, Jožica (ed.). Etnolingvistika po slovensko. Ljubljana: Inštitut za slovenski jezik Frana Ramovša ZRC SAZU. ISBN 978-961-05-0014-8.
