= István Ballér =

Slovene Lutheran priest, dean of Zala and Somogy and writer

István Ballér or Balliér (Slovene: Števan Baler August 28, 1760 – April 2, 1835) was an ethnic Slovene Lutheran priest, dean of Zala and Somogy, and writer. He lived and worked in the Kingdom of Hungary.

Born in the Slovene March (Prekmurje) in the village of Lončarovci (then officially Gerőháza), he received his schooling in Őrség and Nemescsó and higher education in Sopron. He was a cantor and then teacher among the Somogy Slovenes in Kissomlyó, relocated to Porrogszentkirály in 1784, and was then dean of the county from 1805 onward.

Ballér strongly opposed the official replacement of Prekmurje Slovene by Hungarian in the 1830s. He wrote several hymns in the Prekmurje dialect of Slovene.

== Literature ==
- Vili Kerčmar: Evangeličanska cerkev na Slovenskem, Murska Sobota 1995.
- Franc Šebjanič: Protestantsko gibanje panonskih Slovencev, Pomurska založba 1977.

== See also ==
- List of Slovene writers and poets in Hungary
- Magyarization
