= Municipality of Moravske Toplice =

Municipality of Slovenia

Municipality of Moravske Toplice Občina Moravske Toplice
- Municipality
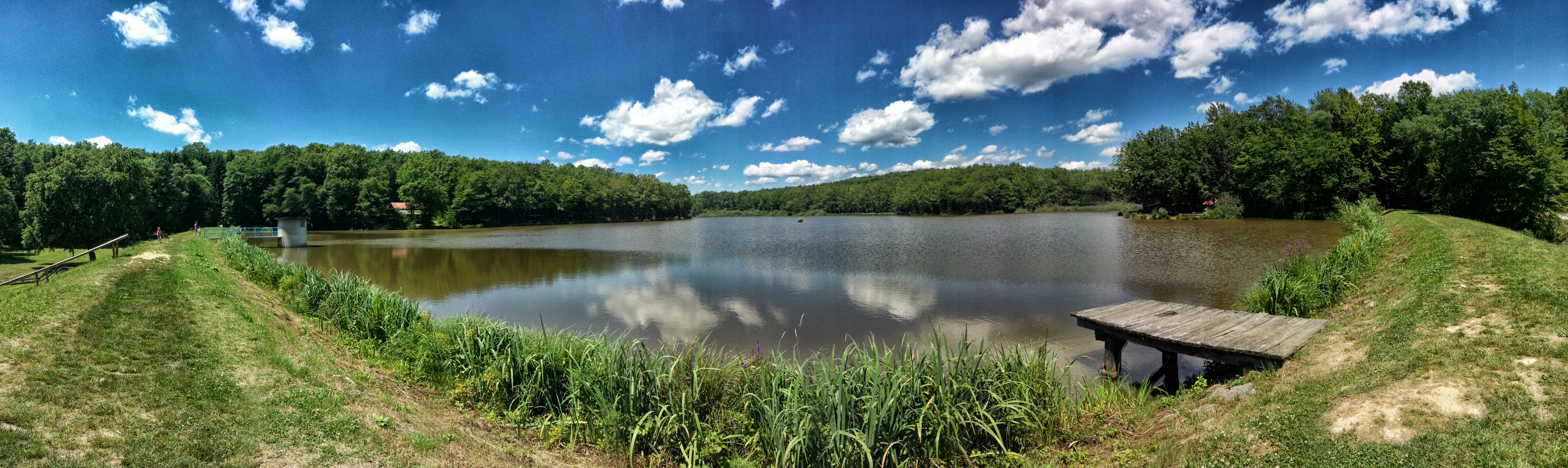

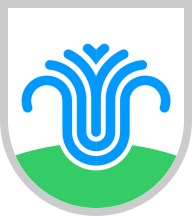
- Coat of arms

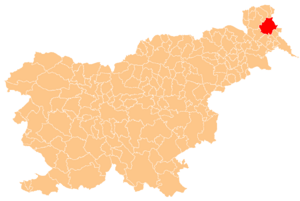
- Location of the Municipality of Moravske Toplice in Slovenia
- Coordinates: 46°41′N 16°13′E
- Country: Slovenia

Government
  - Mayor: Alojz Glavač (SDS)

Area
  - Total: 144.5 km^{2} (55.8 sq mi)

Population (2002)
  - Total: 6,151
  - Density: 42.57/km^{2} (110.2/sq mi)
- Time zone: UTC+01 (CET)
  - Summer (DST): UTC+02 (CEST)
- Website: www.moravske-toplice.si

The Municipality of Moravske Toplice (pronounced [mɔˈɾaːu̯skɛ tɔˈpliːtsɛ]; Slovene: Občina Moravske Toplice) is a municipality in Slovenia, part of the Prekmurje region. Its seat is the spa settlement of Moravske Toplice. The municipality is an important center of Lutheranism in Slovenia. Large Lutheran churches are found throughout the municipality.

== Settlements ==
In addition to the municipal seat of Moravske Toplice, the municipality also includes the following settlements:

- Andrejci
- Berkovci
- Bogojina
- Bukovnica
- Čikečka Vas
- Filovci
- Fokovci
- Ivanci
- Ivanjševci
- Ivanovci
- Kančevci
- Krnci
- Lončarovci
- Lukačevci
- Martjanci
- Mlajtinci
- Motvarjevci
- Noršinci
- Pordašinci
- Prosenjakovci
- Ratkovci
- Sebeborci
- Selo
- Središče
- Suhi Vrh
- Tešanovci
- Vučja Gomila

== Demographics ==
Population by native language, 2002 census
Slovene: 5,617 (91.32%)
Hungarian: 324 (5.26%)
Others and Unknown: 210 (3.42%)
Total: 6,151

The majority of the population is Roman Catholic, but the Lutheran minority makes up more than 40% of the population.
