= Ratkovci =

Village in Prekmurje, Slovenia

Ratkovci Rátkalak
- Location in Slovenia
- Coordinates: 46°45′14.64″N 16°15′49.35″E
- Country: Slovenia
- Traditional region: Prekmurje
- Statistical region: Mura
- Municipality: Moravske Toplice

Area
  - Total: 2.77 km^{2} (1.07 sq mi)
- Elevation: 264.8 m (869 ft)

Population (2021)
  - Total: 54

Ratkovci (pronounced [ˈɾaːtkɔu̯tsi]; Hungarian: Rátkalak) is a small village in the Municipality of Moravske Toplice in the Prekmurje region of Slovenia.

== Geography ==
The population is scattered along the valley of Ratkovci Creek (Slovene: Ratkovski potok) and the road linking Prosenjakovci with Križevci. The shallow valley is dominated by meadows with fields on gentle, sunny slopes and forests at higher elevations. The farms are small, with honey production and dairying being the main economic activities. Most villagers are employed in Prosenjakovci.

== Cultural heritage ==
There is a three-story wooden belfry in the village, built in 1987 to replace an older structure.

== Notable residents ==
Ratkovci is the birthplace of the Hungarian Slovenian priest and writer Péter Kollár.
