= Filovci =

Filovci Filóc
- Location in Slovenia
- Coordinates: 46°39′48.68″N 16°17′56.28″E
- Country: Slovenia
- Traditional region: Prekmurje
- Statistical region: Mura
- Municipality: Moravske Toplice

Area
  - Total: 9.08 km^{2} (3.51 sq mi)
- Elevation: 176.7 m (580 ft)

Population (2002)
  - Total: 486

Filovci (pronounced [ˈfiːlɔu̯tsi]; Hungarian: Filóc) is a village southeast of Bogojina in the Municipality of Moravske Toplice in the Prekmurje region of Slovenia.

A number of traditional houses in the village have been declared cultural monuments, as well preserved typical examples of local thatched architecture from the late 19th and early 20th centuries.

== Notable people ==
Notable people that were born or lived in Filovci include:

- Ferenc Oslay (1883–1932), historian and writer
