= Municipality of Turnišče =

Municipality of Slovenia

Municipality of Turnišče Občina Turnišče
- Municipality
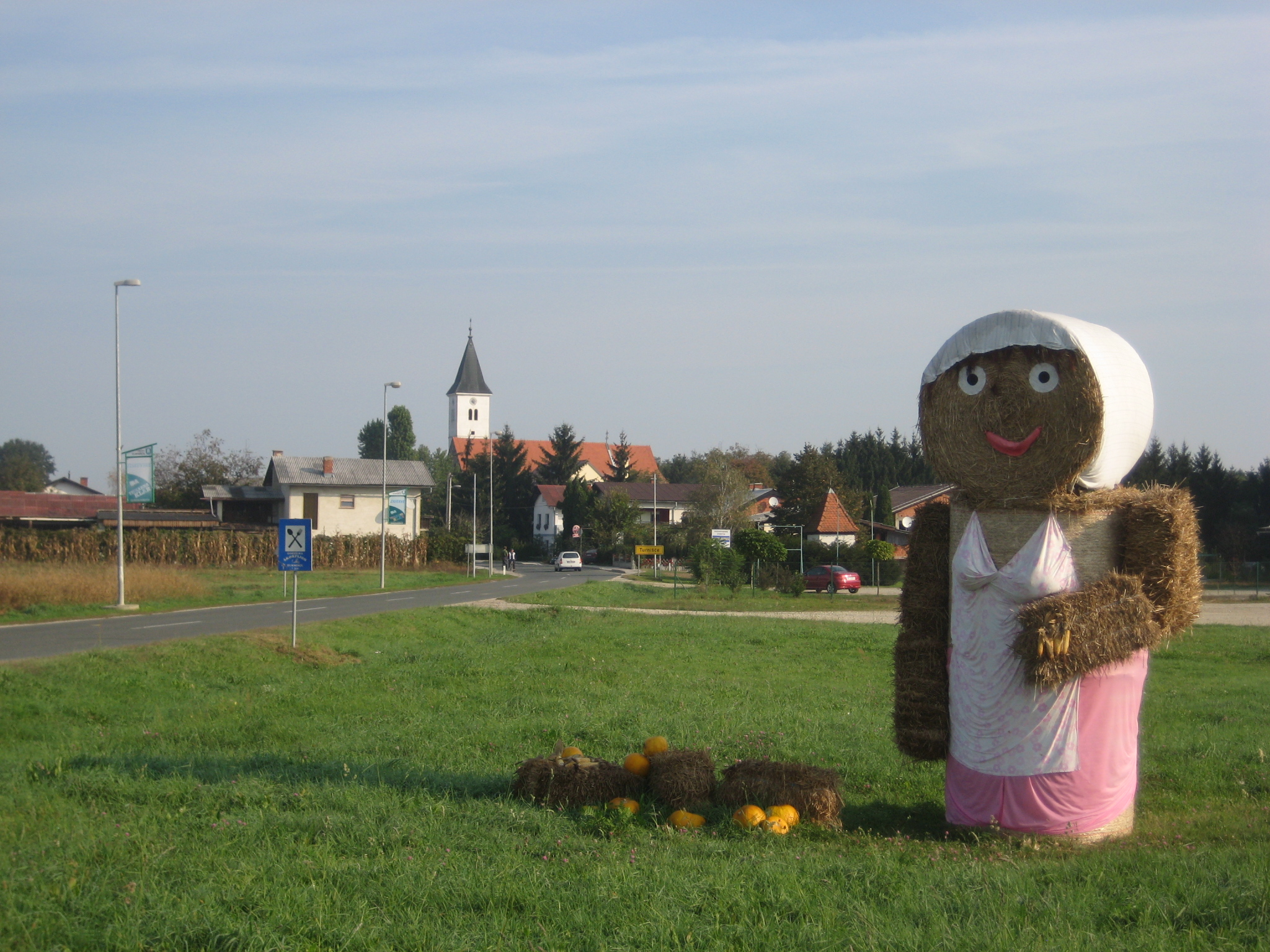

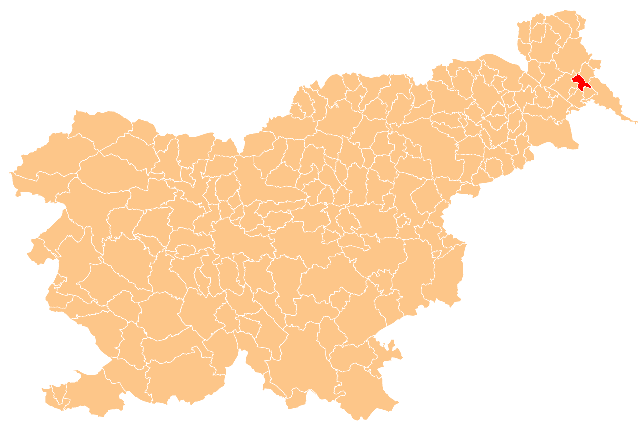
- Location of the Municipality of Turnišče in Slovenia
- Coordinates: 46°38′N 16°19′E
- Country: Slovenia

Government
  - Mayor: Slavko Režonja

Area
  - Total: 23.8 km^{2} (9.2 sq mi)

Population (2002)
  - Total: 3,422
  - Density: 144/km^{2} (372/sq mi)
- Time zone: UTC+01 (CET)
  - Summer (DST): UTC+02 (CEST)
- Website: www.turnisce.si

The Municipality of Turnišče (pronounced [ˈtuːɾniʃtʃɛ]; Slovene: Občina Turnišče) is a municipality in Slovenia. The seat of the municipality is the town of Turnišče.

== Settlements ==
In addition to the namesake town, the municipality also includes the settlements of Gomilica, Nedelica, and Renkovci.
