= Nemespátró =

Coordinates: 46°19′N 17°01′E

- Village
- Interactive map of Nemespátró
- Country: Hungary
- Region: Western Transdanubia
- County: Zala County
- Time zone: UTC+1 (CET)
  - Summer (DST): UTC+2 (CEST)

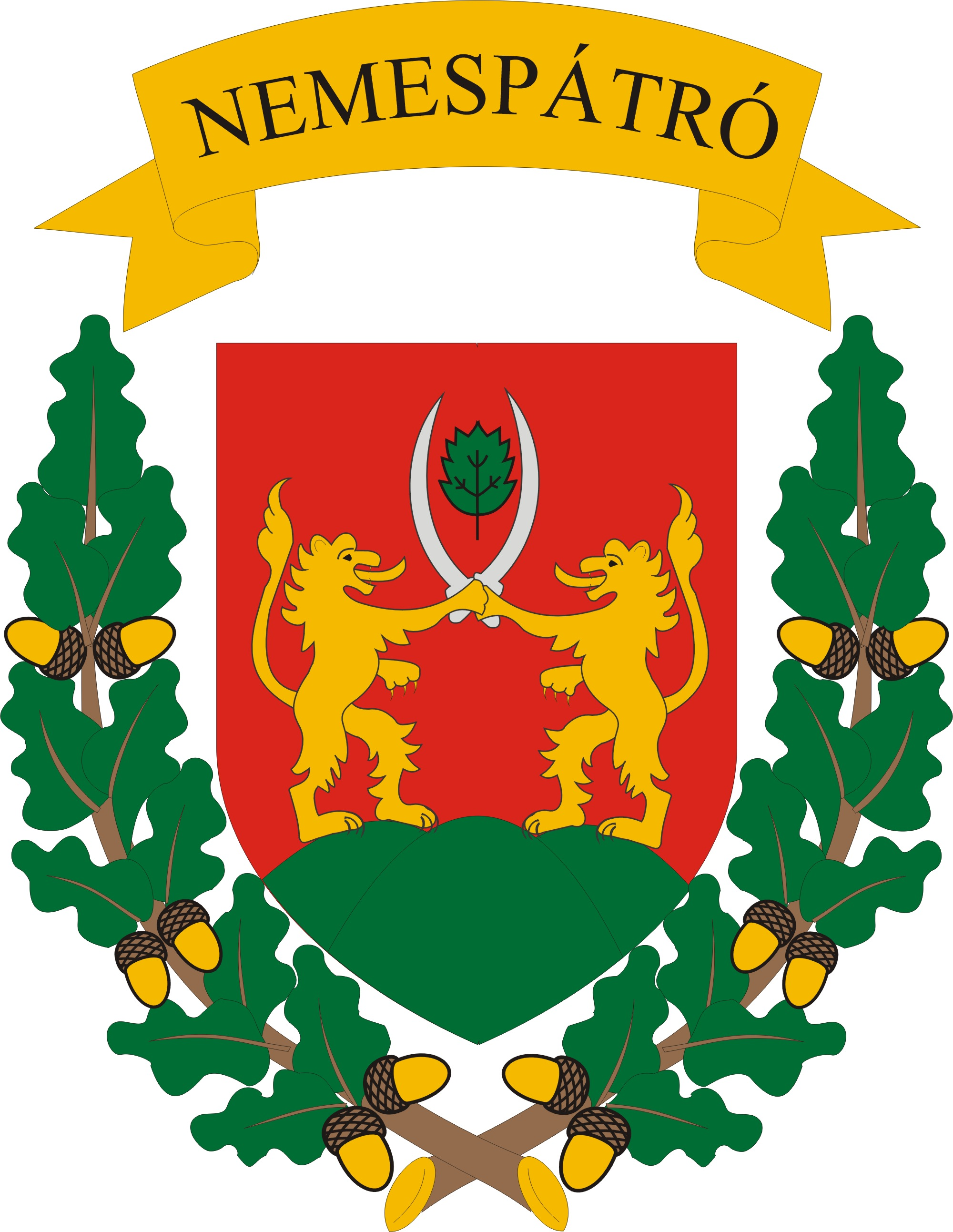
Coat of arms for the town of Nemespátró, Hungary

Nemespátró is a village in Zala County, Hungary. Here lived the Slovene poet Balázs Berke.
