= Nedelica =

- Location in Slovenia
- Coordinates: 46°36′32.66″N 16°20′31.09″E
- Country: Slovenia
- Traditional region: Prekmurje
- Statistical region: Mura
- Municipality: Turnišče

Area
  - Total: 4.97 km^{2} (1.92 sq mi)
- Elevation: 167 m (548 ft)

Population (2002)
  - Total: 579

Nedelica (pronounced [ˈneːdɛlitsa]; Hungarian: Zorkóháza) is a village in the Municipality of Turnišče in the Prekmurje region of northeastern Slovenia.
