= Suhi Vrh, Moravske Toplice =

Suhi Vrh Süji Vrej
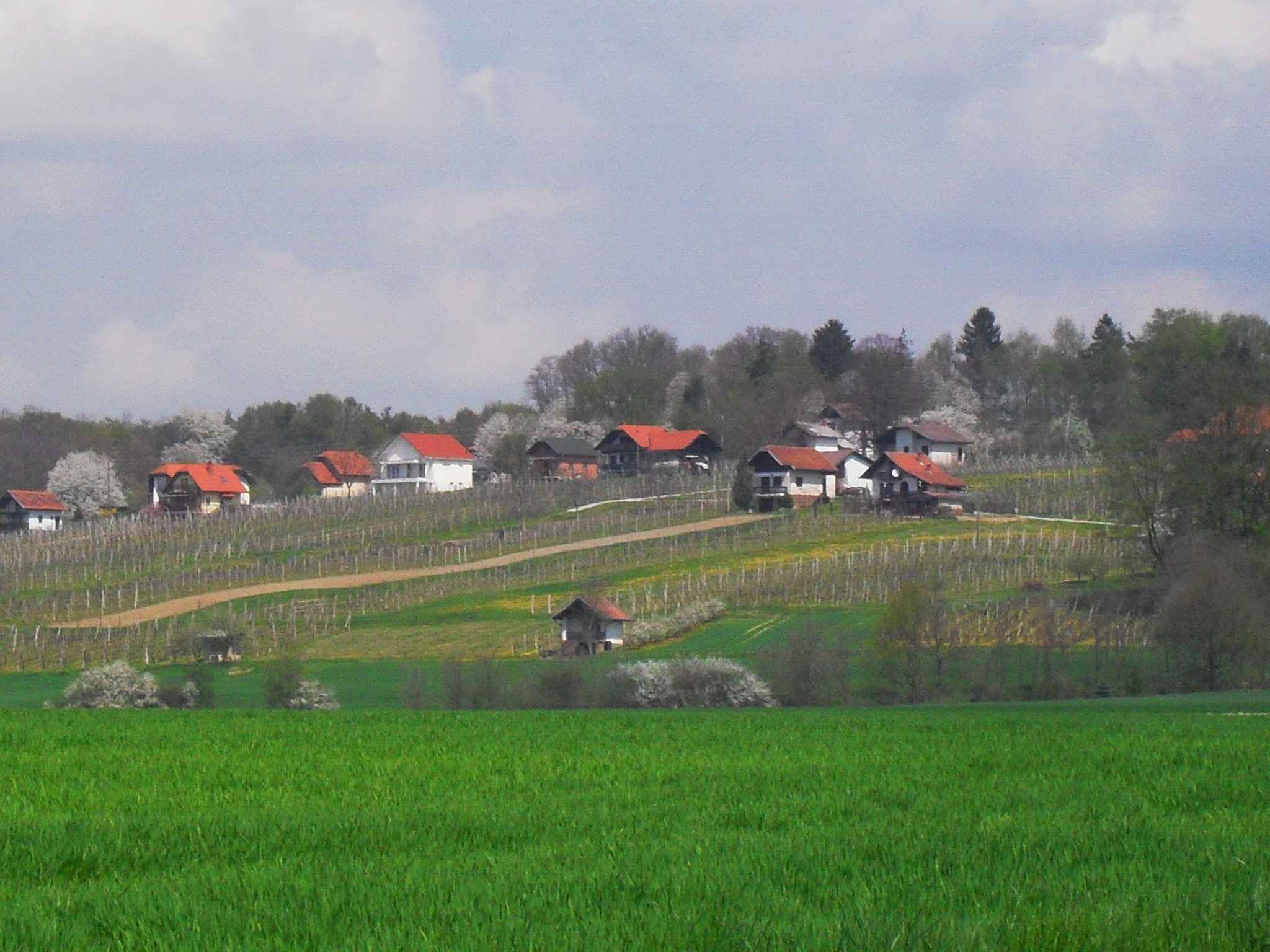

- Location in Slovenia
- Coordinates: 46°42′53.41″N 16°15′21.09″E
- Country: Slovenia
- Traditional region: Prekmurje
- Statistical region: Mura
- Municipality: Moravske Toplice

Area
  - Total: 3.17 km^{2} (1.22 sq mi)
- Elevation: 286.7 m (941 ft)

Population (2002)
  - Total: 95

Suhi Vrh (pronounced [ˈsuːxi ˈʋəɾx]; Hungarian: Szárazhegy, Prekmurje Slovene: Süji Vrej) is a village northeast of Moravske Toplice in the Prekmurje region of Slovenia.

The poet Ádám Farkas was born in Suhi Vrh.
