= Andrejci =

Andrejci Andorhegy
- Location in Slovenia
- Coordinates: 46°43′18.93″N 16°13′27.71″E
- Country: Slovenia
- Traditional region: Prekmurje
- Statistical region: Mura
- Municipality: Moravske Toplice

Area
  - Total: 5.07 km^{2} (1.96 sq mi)
- Elevation: 290.8 m (954 ft)

Population (2002)
  - Total: 222

Andrejci (pronounced [anˈdɾeːi̯tsi]; Hungarian: Andorhegy) is a settlement north of Martjanci in the Municipality of Moravske Toplice in the Prekmurje region of Slovenia.

There is a small Lutheran chapel with a three-storey belfry in the settlement. It was built in 1925.
