= Izvir, Brežice =

Izvir
- Location in Slovenia
- Coordinates: 45°51′34.08″N 15°33′6.69″E
- Country: Slovenia
- Traditional region: Lower Carniola
- Statistical region: Lower Sava
- Municipality: Brežice

Area
  - Total: 1.83 km^{2} (0.71 sq mi)
- Elevation: 289.6 m (950 ft)

Population (2020)
  - Total: 16
  - Density: 8.7/km^{2} (23/sq mi)

Izvir (pronounced [iˈzʋiːɾ]) is a small settlement in the Municipality of Brežice in eastern Slovenia. It lies in the Gorjanci Mountains close to the border with Croatia. The area is part of the traditional region of Lower Carniola. It is now included in the Lower Sava Statistical Region.

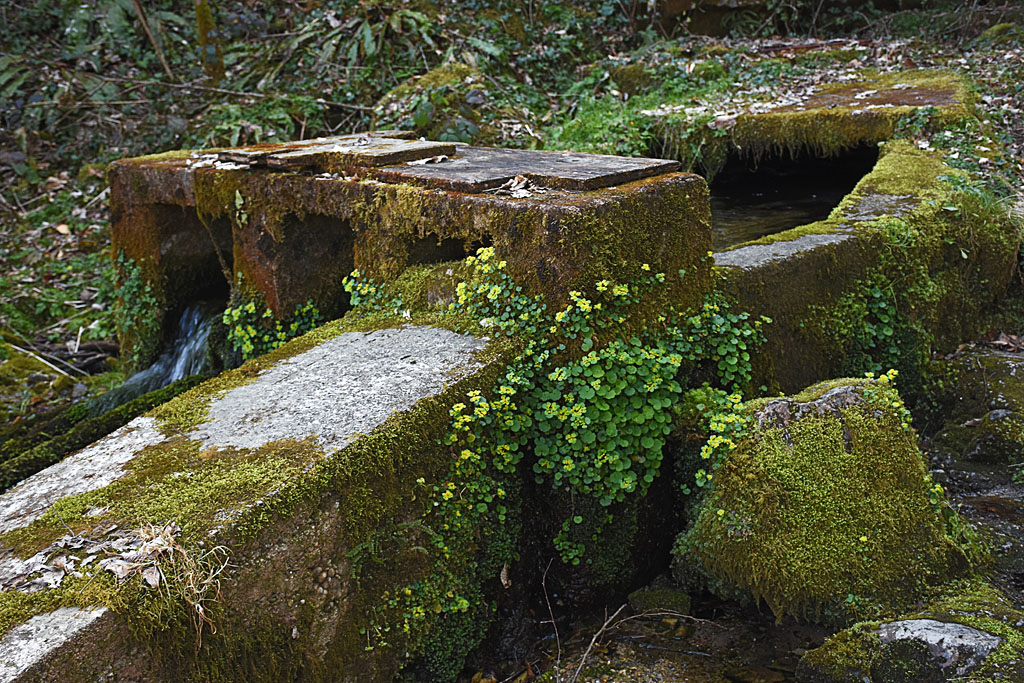
Reconstructed Roman cistern near Izvir

The name Izvir means 'spring' or 'source of water' in Slovene. Chance finds of Roman clay piping and archaeological excavations in the 1930s revealed a now-reconstructed water cistern at the source of a stream and a Roman aqueduct supplying water to the nearby settlement of Neviodunum.
