= Motvarjevci =

Motvarjevci Szécsiszentlászló
- Location in Slovenia
- Coordinates: 46°42′21.45″N 16°20′55.61″E
- Country: Slovenia
- Traditional region: Prekmurje
- Statistical region: Mura
- Municipality: Moravske Toplice

Area
  - Total: 10.19 km^{2} (3.93 sq mi)
- Elevation: 202.6 m (665 ft)

Population (2002)
  - Total: 189

Motvarjevci (pronounced [mɔˈtʋaːɾjɛu̯tsi]; Hungarian: Szécsiszentlászló or Szentlászló) is a village in the Municipality of Moravske Toplice in the Prekmurje region of Slovenia, right on the border with Hungary.
