= Mlajtinci =

Mlajtinci Kismálnás
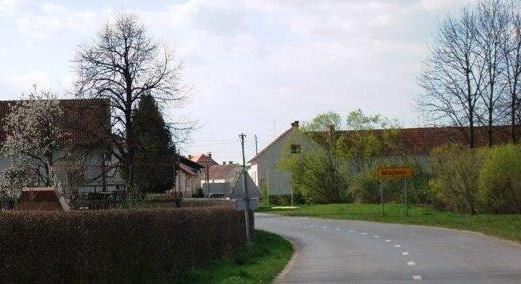

- Location in Slovenia
- Coordinates: 46°40′4.83″N 16°13′36.49″E
- Country: Slovenia
- Traditional region: Prekmurje
- Statistical region: Mura
- Municipality: Moravske Toplice

Area
  - Total: 6.28 km^{2} (2.42 sq mi)
- Elevation: 183.7 m (603 ft)

Population (2002)
  - Total: 188

Mlajtinci (pronounced [ˈmlaːi̯tintsi]; Hungarian: Kismálnás) is a village south of Moravske Toplice in the Prekmurje region of Slovenia.
