= Lončarovci =

Lončarovci Gerőháza
- Location in Slovenia
- Coordinates: 46°46′1.42″N 16°16′5.52″E
- Country: Slovenia
- Traditional region: Prekmurje
- Statistical region: Mura
- Municipality: Moravske Toplice

Area
  - Total: 3.41 km^{2} (1.32 sq mi)
- Elevation: 285.2 m (936 ft)

Population (2002)
  - Total: 63

Lončarovci (pronounced [lɔnˈtʃaːɾɔu̯tsi]; Hungarian: Gerőháza) is a village in the Municipality of Moravske Toplice in the Prekmurje region of Slovenia.

There is a free-standing three-storey belfry in the middle of the village. It was built in the 1940s. The writer István Ballér was born in Lončarovci.
