= Središče, Moravske Toplice =

Središče Szerdahely
- Location in Slovenia
- Coordinates: 46°46′18.77″N 16°18′41.02″E
- Country: Slovenia
- Traditional region: Prekmurje
- Statistical region: Mura
- Municipality: Moravske Toplice

Area
  - Total: 3.81 km^{2} (1.47 sq mi)
- Elevation: 246.2 m (808 ft)

Population (2002)
  - Total: 66
- Postal code: 9207

Središče (pronounced [sɾɛˈdiːʃtʃɛ]; Hungarian: Szerdahely) is a small village in the Municipality of Moravske Toplice in the Prekmurje region of Slovenia, by the border with Hungary. Središče has a population of 66 people; it has one church, a firehouse, and a cultural association (Kulturno društvo Antal Ferenc).

== Mass grave ==
Središče is the site of a mass grave associated with the Second World War or its aftermath. The Središče Mass Grave (Slovene: Grobišče Središče) lies northeast of the village, in an abandoned and overgrown part of the village cemetery. It contains the remains of three Hungarians who were shot while crossing the border illegally.

== Gallery ==
Historical images of Središče from 20th-century postcards

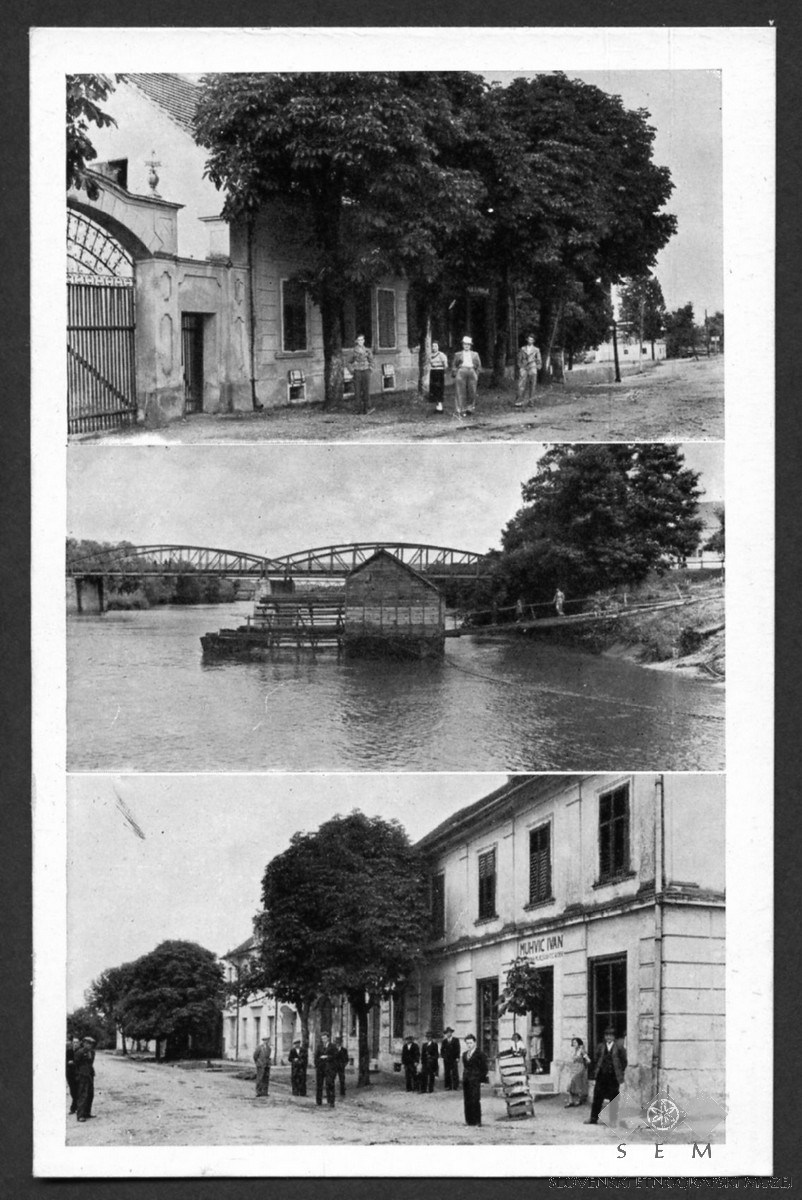

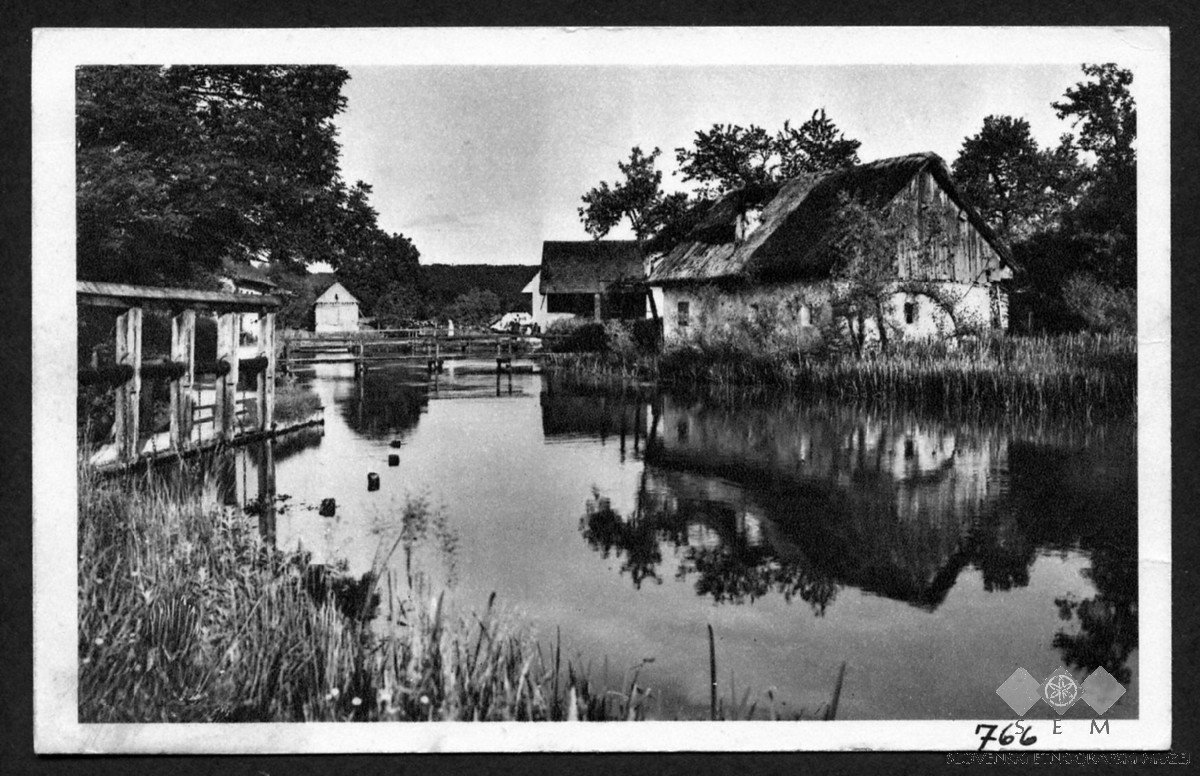

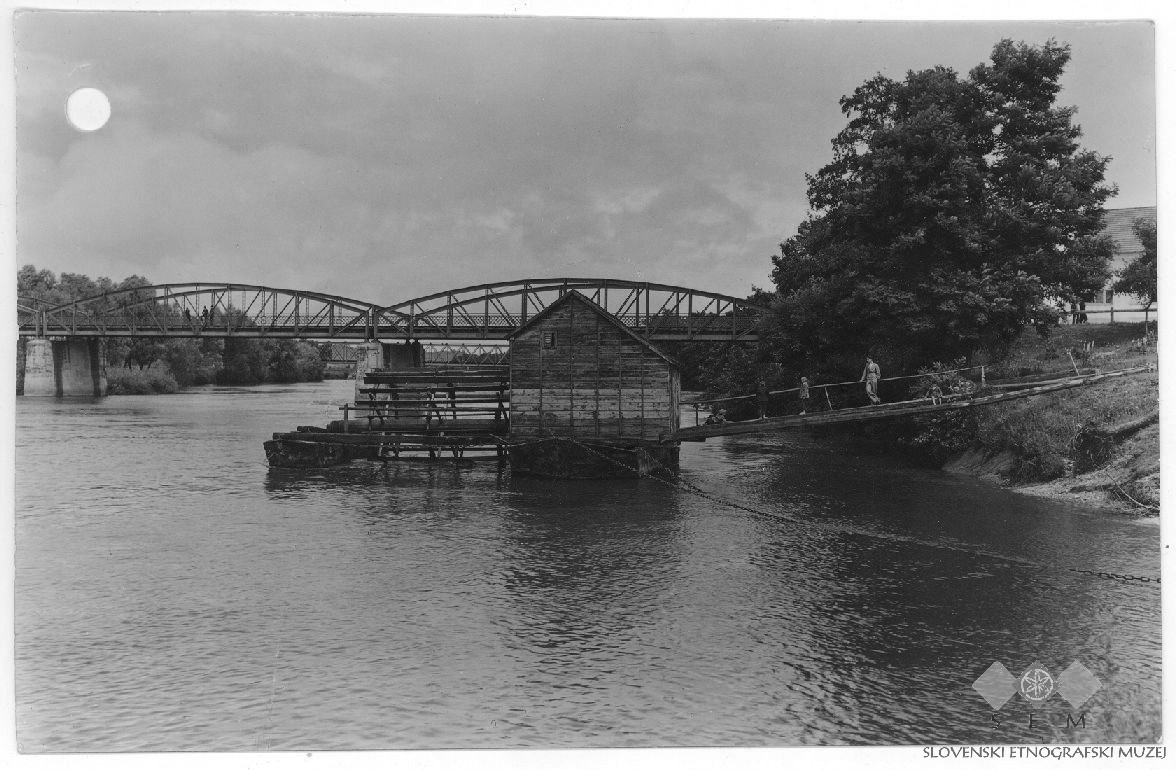
