= Pordašinci =

Pordašinci Kisfalu
- Location in Slovenia
- Coordinates: 46°43′24.44″N 16°20′11.92″E
- Country: Slovenia
- Traditional region: Prekmurje
- Statistical region: Mura
- Municipality: Moravske Toplice

Area
  - Total: 2.43 km^{2} (0.94 sq mi)
- Elevation: 216.5 m (710 ft)

Population (2002)
  - Total: 50

Pordašinci (pronounced [pɔɾˈdaːʃintsi]; Hungarian: Kisfalu) is a roadside village in the Municipality of Moravske Toplice in the Prekmurje region of Slovenia, close to the border with Hungary.

There is a wooden belfry in the centre of the village. It was erected in 1926.
