= Lukačevci =

Lukačevci Likačavci
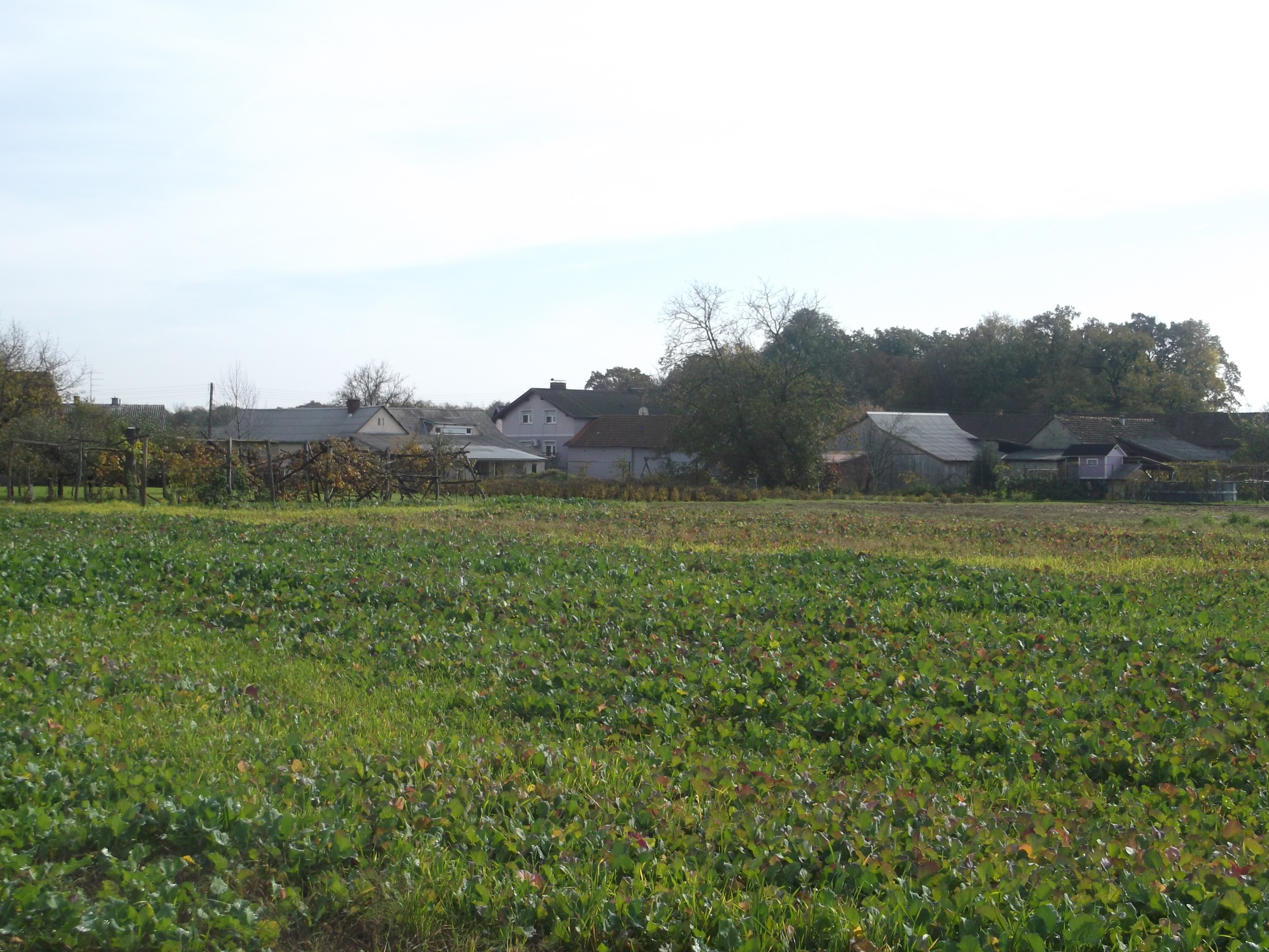

- Location in Slovenia
- Coordinates: 46°40′0.91″N 16°13′9.58″E
- Country: Slovenia
- Traditional region: Prekmurje
- Statistical region: Mura
- Municipality: Moravske Toplice

Area
  - Total: 1.38 km^{2} (0.53 sq mi)
- Elevation: 184.7 m (606 ft)

Population (2002)
  - Total: 54

Lukačevci (pronounced [luˈkaːtʃɛu̯tsi]; Hungarian: Lukácsfa, Prekmurje Slovene: Likačavci) is a village in the Municipality of Moravske Toplice in the Prekmurje region of Slovenia.

The local chapel, built on the outskirts of the village, is dedicated to Saints Peter and Paul and belongs to the Parish of Murska Sobota.

== Bibliography ==
- Cipot Hari, Laura (2016). Besedje za kmečko hišo in orodje v izbranih prekmurskih govorih. Diplomsko delo. Maribor: Filozofska fakulteta Univerze v Mariboru. Oddelek za slovanske jezike in književnosti. "Med domačini in okoliškimi prebivalci, predvsem tistimi starejšimi, je še vedno v rabi domače prekmursko ime Likačavci."
