= Selo, Moravske Toplice =

Selo Selo v Prekmurju (until 1952), Nagytótlak
- Location in Slovenia
- Coordinates: 46°43′43.9″N 16°17′20.48″E
- Country: Slovenia
- Traditional region: Prekmurje
- Statistical region: Mura
- Municipality: Moravske Toplice

Area
  - Total: 9.23 km^{2} (3.56 sq mi)
- Elevation: 289.7 m (950 ft)

Population (2016)
  - Total: 254

Selo (pronounced [ˈsɛːlɔ]; Hungarian: Nagytótlak) is a village in the Municipality of Moravske Toplice in the Prekmurje region of Slovenia.

== Name ==
The name of the settlement was changed from Selo v Prekmurju to Selo in 1952.

== Churches ==
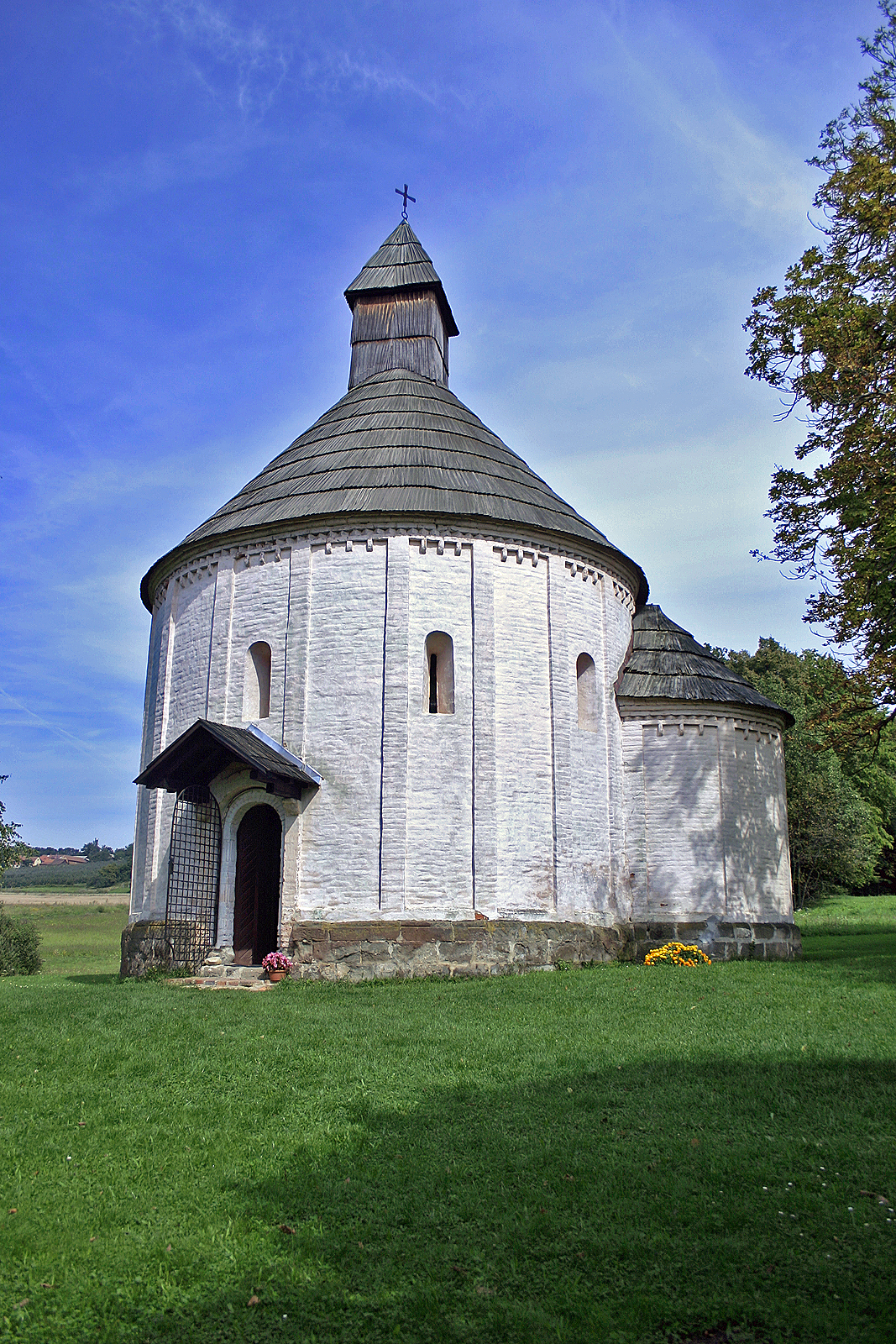
St. Nicholas's Rotunda

There are two churches in the settlement. The best known is the rotunda of Saint Nicholas and the Virgin Mary, a Romanesque building from the early 13th century, built in a field on the northern outskirts of the main settlement. It is the best-known rotunda in Slovenia. Its interior is covered in frescos from the early 14th and 15th centuries. The second church is the local Lutheran church. It was built in the Neoromanesque style at the turn of the 20th century and has a tall belfry with a steep roof.
