= Renkovci =

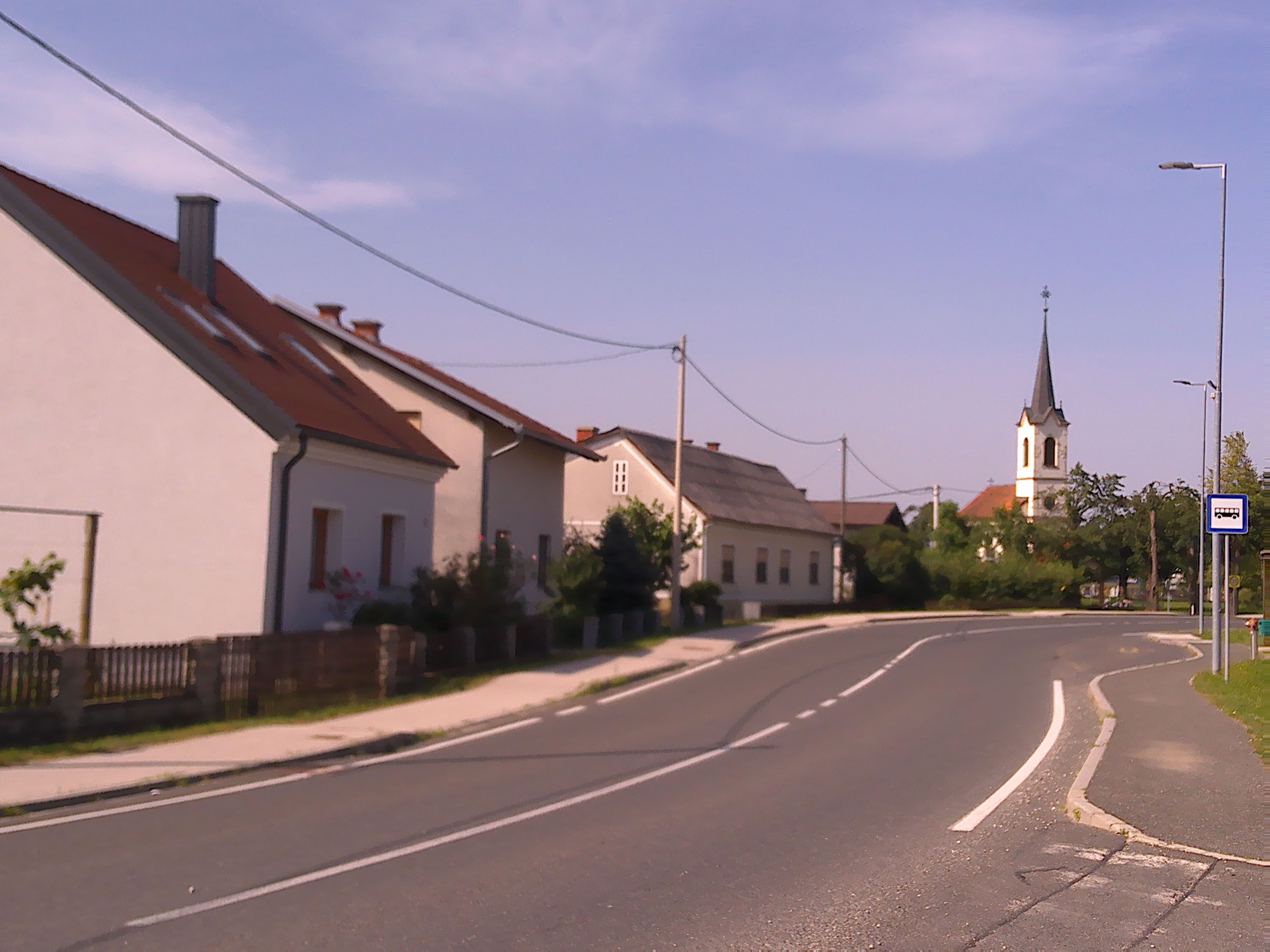

- Location in Slovenia
- Coordinates: 46°38′18.87″N 16°17′30.43″E
- Country: Slovenia
- Traditional region: Prekmurje
- Statistical region: Mura
- Municipality: Turnišče

Area
  - Total: 4.5 km^{2} (1.7 sq mi)
- Elevation: 174.3 m (572 ft)

Population (2002)
  - Total: 626

Renkovci (pronounced [ˈɾeːnkɔu̯tsi]; Hungarian: Lendvaerdő) is a village in the Municipality of Turnišče in the Prekmurje region of northeastern Slovenia.
