= Vučja Gomila =

Vučja Gomila Vuča Gomila
- Location in Slovenia
- Coordinates: 46°42′10.18″N 16°16′33.52″E
- Country: Slovenia
- Traditional region: Prekmurje
- Statistical region: Mura
- Municipality: Moravske Toplice

Area
  - Total: 9.98 km^{2} (3.85 sq mi)
- Elevation: 264.3 m (867 ft)

Population (2002)
  - Total: 330

Vučja Gomila (pronounced [ˈʋuːtʃja ɡɔˈmiːla]; Hungarian: Zsidahegy, Prekmurje Slovene: Vuča Gomila) is a village in the Municipality of Moravske Toplice in the Prekmurje region of Slovenia.
