= Gomilica =

- Location in Slovenia
- Coordinates: 46°35′58.88″N 16°18′47.31″E
- Country: Slovenia
- Traditional region: Prekmurje
- Statistical region: Mura
- Municipality: Turnišče

Area
  - Total: 6.3 km^{2} (2.4 sq mi)
- Elevation: 169.4 m (556 ft)

Population (2002)
  - Total: 662

Gomilica (pronounced [ɡɔˈmiːlitsa]; Hungarian: Lendvaszentjózsef) is a village in the Municipality of Turnišče in the Prekmurje region of northeastern Slovenia.

An Eneolithic settlement was discovered near the village in 1981 by sensing. The habitation layer was between 45 and 70 cm deep and contained pot shards.
