= Wendish question =

Hungarian historical issue

The Wendish question (Hungarian: Vendkérdés, Slovene: Vendsko vprašanje, Prekmurje Slovene: Vendsko pítanje, or Vendiško pitanje) in Hungarian Nationalist and Chauvinist politics concerns the origin and nomenclature of the Hungarian Slovenes.

The traditional Hungarian term for the Slovenes living in Hungary was "Wend" (Hungarian: Vend). Many Slovenes in Hungary accepted this nomenclature, although in their dialect, they always referred to themselves as "Slovenes". In the last decades of the 19th century, and especially during the Horthy regime, the term "Wend" was used in order to emphasize the difference between the Slovenes of historic Hungary and other Slovenes.

The term Wend received popular use among the emigre community in Bethlehem, Pennsylvania. This same community vigorously opposed the including of Prekmurje into the new Yugoslavia, lobbying the US Trianon negotiators against such inclusion.

The border between Hungary and Kingdom of Serbs, Croats and Slovenes was finally regulated by the Treaty of Trianon on June 4, 1920. The territory inhabited by Slovenes (the so-called Vendvidék) was divided by the watershed of the two rivers Rába and Mura. The Mura region (Prekmurje), including the areas of Murska Sobota and Lendava, went to Kingdom of Serbs, Croats and Slovenes, while the Raba Region (Porabje) including nine communes around Szentgotthárd, became part of Hungary. After this separation, the two regions' economy, politics, culture and ethnicity developed independently.

After the German invasion of Yugoslavia in 1941, Hungary annexed the regions lost in 1920 including Slovenian Prekmurje. It was expedient to argue that the inhabitants of the Prekmurje region were not Slovenes after all, helping to substantiate Hungary's claim to Prekmurje. Sándor Mikola, a well-known Hungarian physicist hailing from Slovenian Prekmurje, used his influence to publicize this view in his book A Vendség múltja és jelene (The past and present of the Wends). In the book he describes how the Wends were descended from the Celts, but assimilated into the surrounding Slavic population. This theory has no scientific foundation and is not linguistically substantiated in the language of this population.

Prekmurje remained a part of SFR Yugoslavia and SR Slovenia when the Trianon boundaries were restored after World War II.
