= Čikečka Vas =

Čikečka Vas Csekefa
- Location in Slovenia
- Coordinates: 46°43′15.74″N 16°19′12.37″E
- Country: Slovenia
- Traditional region: Prekmurje
- Statistical region: Mura
- Municipality: Moravske Toplice

Area
  - Total: 4.27 km^{2} (1.65 sq mi)
- Elevation: 230 m (750 ft)

Population (2002)
  - Total: 95

Čikečka Vas (pronounced [tʃiˈkeːtʃka ˈʋaːs] or [ˈtʃiːkɛtʃka ˈʋaːs]; Slovene: Čikečka vas, Hungarian: Csekefa) is a village in the Municipality of Moravske Toplice in the Prekmurje region of Slovenia. The village includes the hamlets of Felső-vég, Alsó-vég, and Cseke-hegy. It also has many Hungarian-language microtoponyms, including Alsó-mező, Felső-mező, and Külsö-hegy (fields), Vizköz and Alsó-rét (meadows), and Nagy-ritás and Ritka-tögyes (woods).

== Name ==
Čikečka Vas is also known as Čikečka ves in the local dialect. It is known as Csekefa in Hungarian.

== History ==
Čikečka Vas was first mentioned in written sources in 1208. A school was established in 1941, but was discontinued in 1945. A fire station was built in 1954. The local mill stopped operating in 1962.

=== Clandestine grave ===
Čikečka Vas is the site of a clandestine grave associated with the Second World War or its aftermath. The Čikečka Vas Grave (Slovene: Grobišče Čikečka vas) lies east of the village, in the parking lot left of the entrance to the village cemetery. It contains the remains of a Hungarian shot while crossing the border illegally.

== Chapel ==
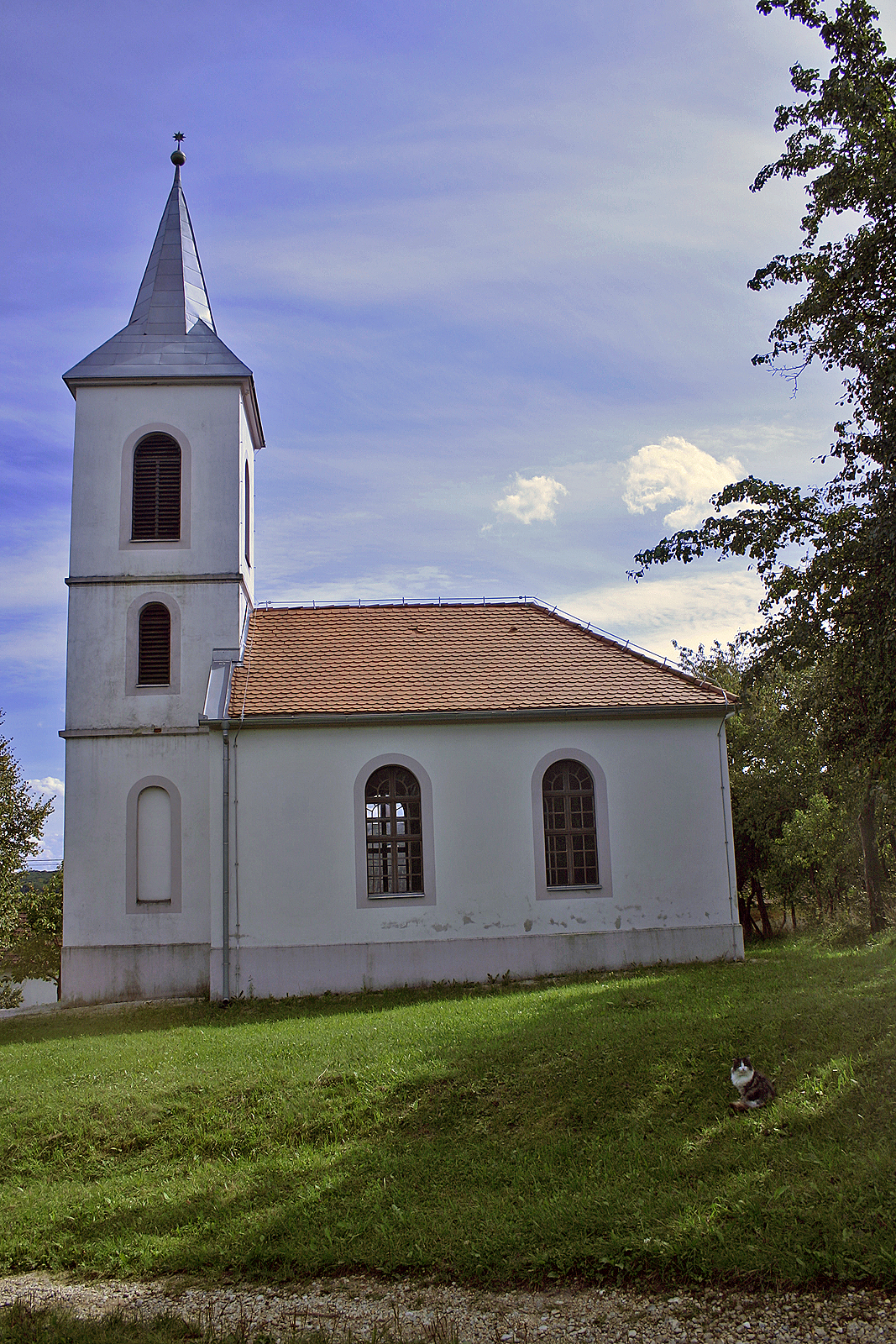
Chapel in Čikečka Vas

There is a small chapel with a three-storey belfry in the settlement.
