= Abucea =

River in Hunedoara, Romania

Abucea Abucsa-patak
- Location within Romania

Location
- Country: Romania
- Counties: Hunedoara County
- Villages: Panc-Săliște, Abucea

Physical characteristics
- Source: Poiana Ruscă Mountains
- Mouth: Mureș
  - location: Abucea
  - coordinates: 45.9306°N 22.5320°E
- Length: 15 km (9.3 mi)
- Basin size: 23 km^{2} (8.9 sq mi)

Basin features
- Progression: Mureș→ Tisza→ Danube→ Black Sea

The Abucea (Hungarian: Abucsa-patak) is a left tributary of the river Mureș in Romania. It discharges into the Mureș in Abucea. Its length is 15 km (9.3 mi) and its basin size is 23 km^{2} (8.9 sq mi).
