= Ivanci =

Ivanci Zalaivánd
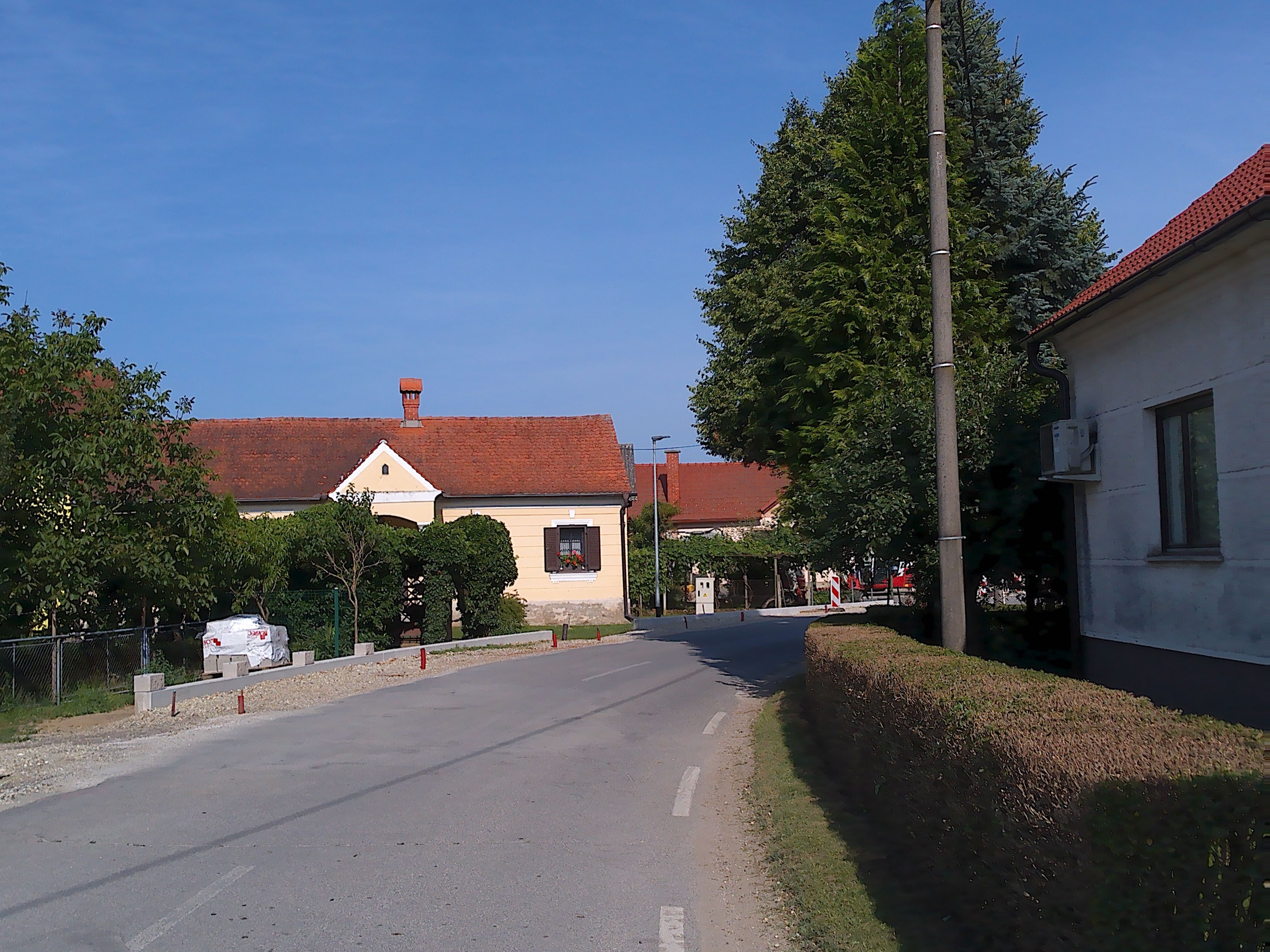
- Street in Ivanci

- Location in Slovenia
- Coordinates: 46°39′27.98″N 16°15′29.49″E
- Country: Slovenia
- Traditional region: Prekmurje
- Statistical region: Mura
- Municipality: Moravske Toplice

Area
  - Total: 4.38 km^{2} (1.69 sq mi)
- Elevation: 178.7 m (586 ft)

Population (2002)
  - Total: 254

Ivanci (pronounced [iˈʋaːntsi]; Hungarian: Zalaivánd) is a small village southeast of Bogojina in the Municipality of Moravske Toplice in the Prekmurje region of Slovenia.
