= Krnci =

Krnci Lendvakislak
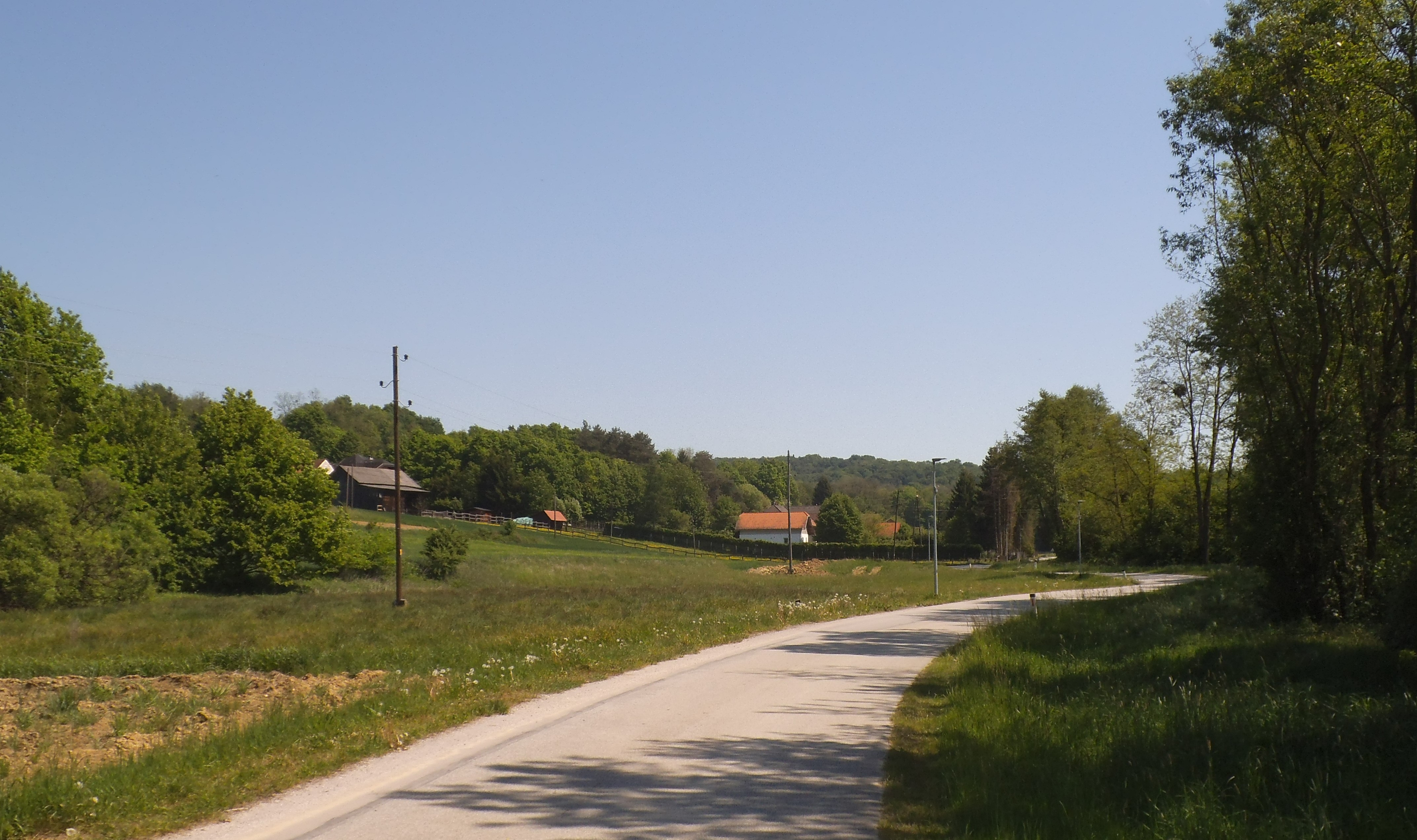

- Location in Slovenia
- Coordinates: 46°44′3.55″N 16°12′34.55″E
- Country: Slovenia
- Traditional region: Prekmurje
- Statistical region: Mura
- Municipality: Moravske Toplice

Area
  - Total: 2.63 km^{2} (1.02 sq mi)
- Elevation: 239 m (784 ft)

Population (2002)
  - Total: 59

Krnci (pronounced [ˈkəɾntsi]; Hungarian: Lendvakislak) is a small village in the Municipality of Moravske Toplice in the Prekmurje region of Slovenia.

There is a small chapel in a free-standing belfry in the cemetery outside the village.
