= Sebeborci =

Sebeborci Seböborci
- Location in Slovenia
- Coordinates: 46°42′30.33″N 16°11′58.09″E
- Country: Slovenia
- Traditional region: Prekmurje
- Statistical region: Mura
- Municipality: Moravske Toplice

Area
  - Total: 7.82 km^{2} (3.02 sq mi)
- Elevation: 221.7 m (727 ft)

Population (2002)
  - Total: 485

Sebeborci (pronounced [sɛˈbeːbɔɾtsi]; Hungarian: Szentbibor, Prekmurje Slovene: Seböborci) is a village in the Municipality of Moravske Toplice in the Prekmurje region of Slovenia.
