= Fokovci =

Fokovci Foukovci
- Location in Slovenia
- Coordinates: 46°44′14.37″N 16°15′51.23″E
- Country: Slovenia
- Traditional region: Prekmurje
- Statistical region: Mura
- Municipality: Moravske Toplice

Area
  - Total: 6.03 km^{2} (2.33 sq mi)
- Elevation: 317.6 m (1,042 ft)

Population (2002)
  - Total: 231

Fokovci (pronounced [ˈfoːkɔu̯tsi]; Hungarian: Úrdomb, Prekmurje Slovene: Foukovci) is a village north of Moravske Toplice in the Prekmurje region of Slovenia.

There is a small chapel with a three-storey belfry next to the graveyard in the settlement. There is also a Pentecostal church in the settlement.
