= Noršinci, Moravske Toplice =

Noršinci Újtölgyes
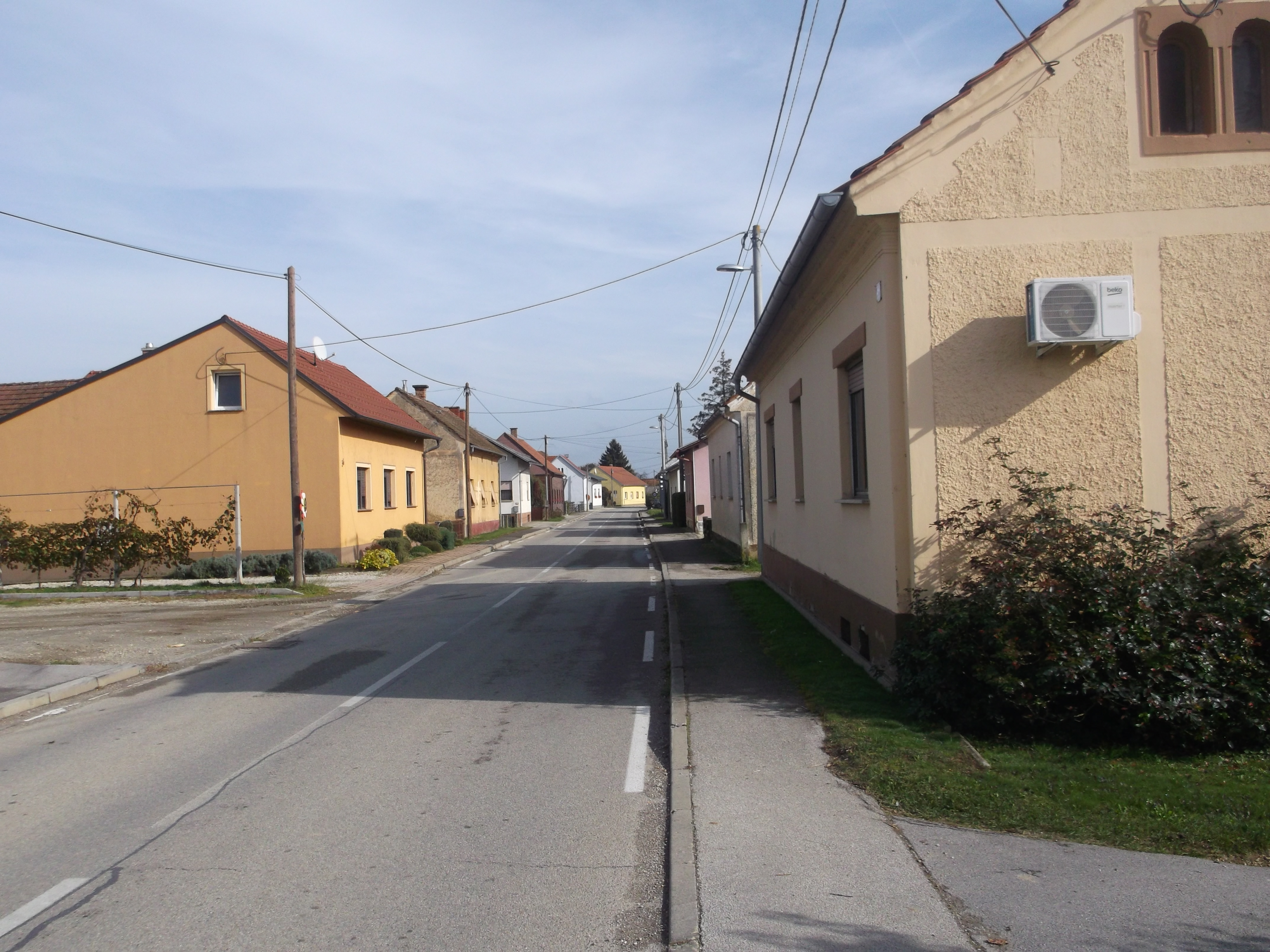

- Location in Slovenia
- Coordinates: 46°40′11.14″N 16°12′21.35″E
- Country: Slovenia
- Traditional region: Prekmurje
- Statistical region: Mura
- Municipality: Moravske Toplice

Area
  - Total: 3.46 km^{2} (1.34 sq mi)
- Elevation: 186.6 m (612 ft)

Population (2002)
  - Total: 244

Noršinci (pronounced [ˈnoːɾʃintsi]; Hungarian: Újtölgyes, German: Urschendorf) is a roadside village south of Martjanci in the Municipality of Moravske Toplice in the Prekmurje region of Slovenia.

The writer and poet János Kardos was born in the village.
