= Kančevci =

Kančevci Felsőszentbenedek
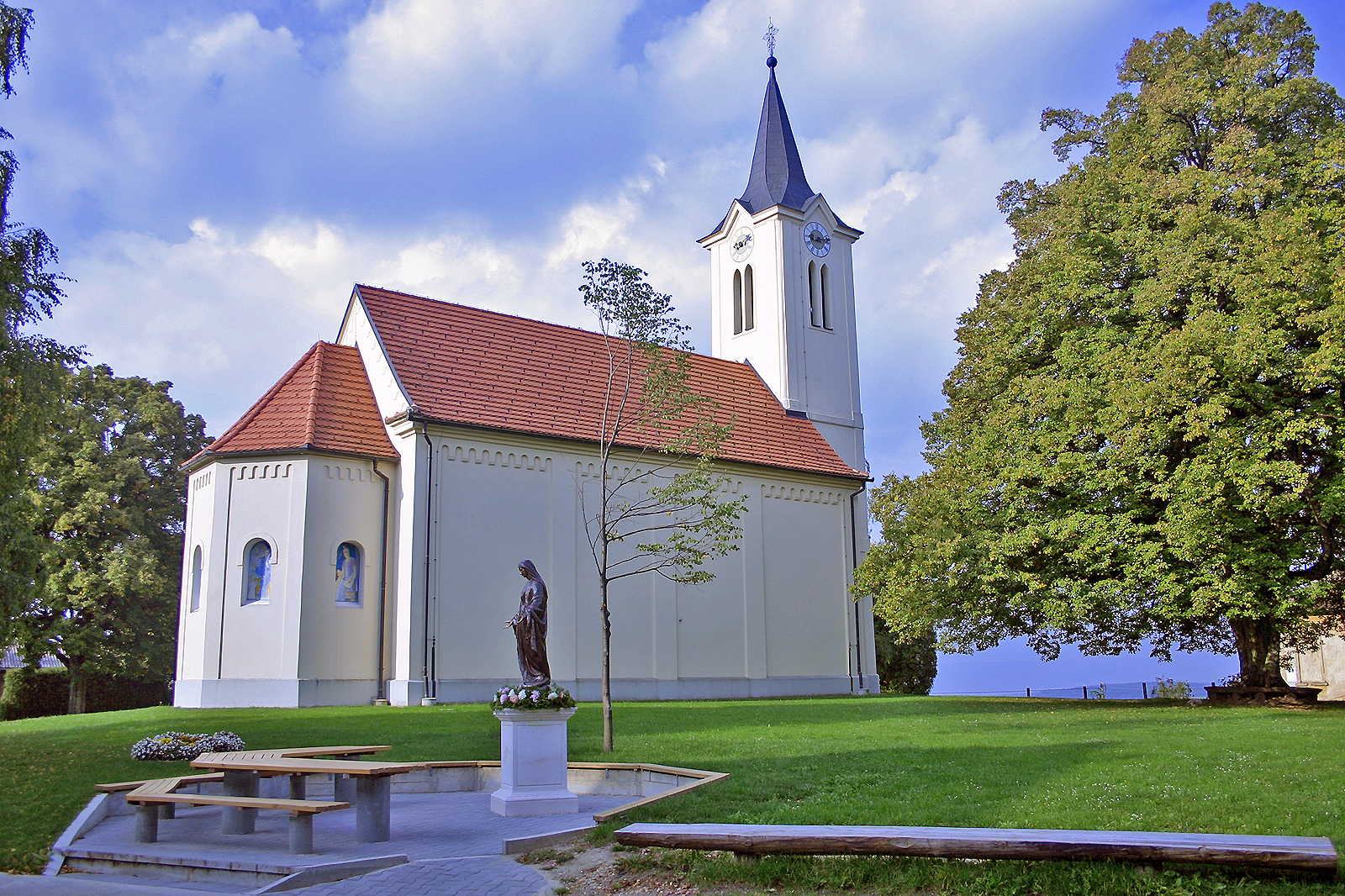
- St. Benedict's Parish Church

- Location in Slovenia
- Coordinates: 46°45′21.42″N 16°14′21.85″E
- Country: Slovenia
- Traditional region: Prekmurje
- Statistical region: Mura
- Municipality: Moravske Toplice

Area
  - Total: 4.1 km^{2} (1.6 sq mi)
- Elevation: 331.5 m (1,088 ft)

Population (2002)
  - Total: 55

Kančevci (pronounced [ˈkaːntʃɛu̯tsi]; Hungarian: Felsőszentbenedek, Prekmurje Slovene: Kančovci) is a village in the Municipality of Moravske Toplice in the Prekmurje region of Slovenia.

== Church ==
The parish church, built to the east of the main settlement, is dedicated to Saint Benedict. It was first mentioned in written sources dating to 1208. It has a single nave with a polygonal choir and was extensively renovated and rebuilt in a Neo-Romanesque style in 1898. It belongs to the Roman Catholic Diocese of Murska Sobota.

== Notable people ==
- Miklós Küzmics (1737–1804), writer
