= Ádám Farkas (poet) =

Slovene Lutheran priest, poet, and rector

Ádám Farkas (Slovene: Adam Farkaš, 1730 – February 12, 1786) Slovene was a Lutheran priest, poet, and rector of the lyceum in Sopron.

Farkas was born in Suhi Vrh, Moravske Toplice. He studied in Jena and Sopron. By November 1, 1785, he was rector of the Lutheran Lyceum. He also wrote poems in German and the Prekmurje Slovene.

== Literature ==
- Vili Kerčmar: Evangeličanska cerkev na Slovenskem, Murska Sobota 1995.

== See also ==
- List of Slovene writers and poets in Hungary
