= Lopadea Nouă =

Lopadea Nouă Magyarlapád
- Commune
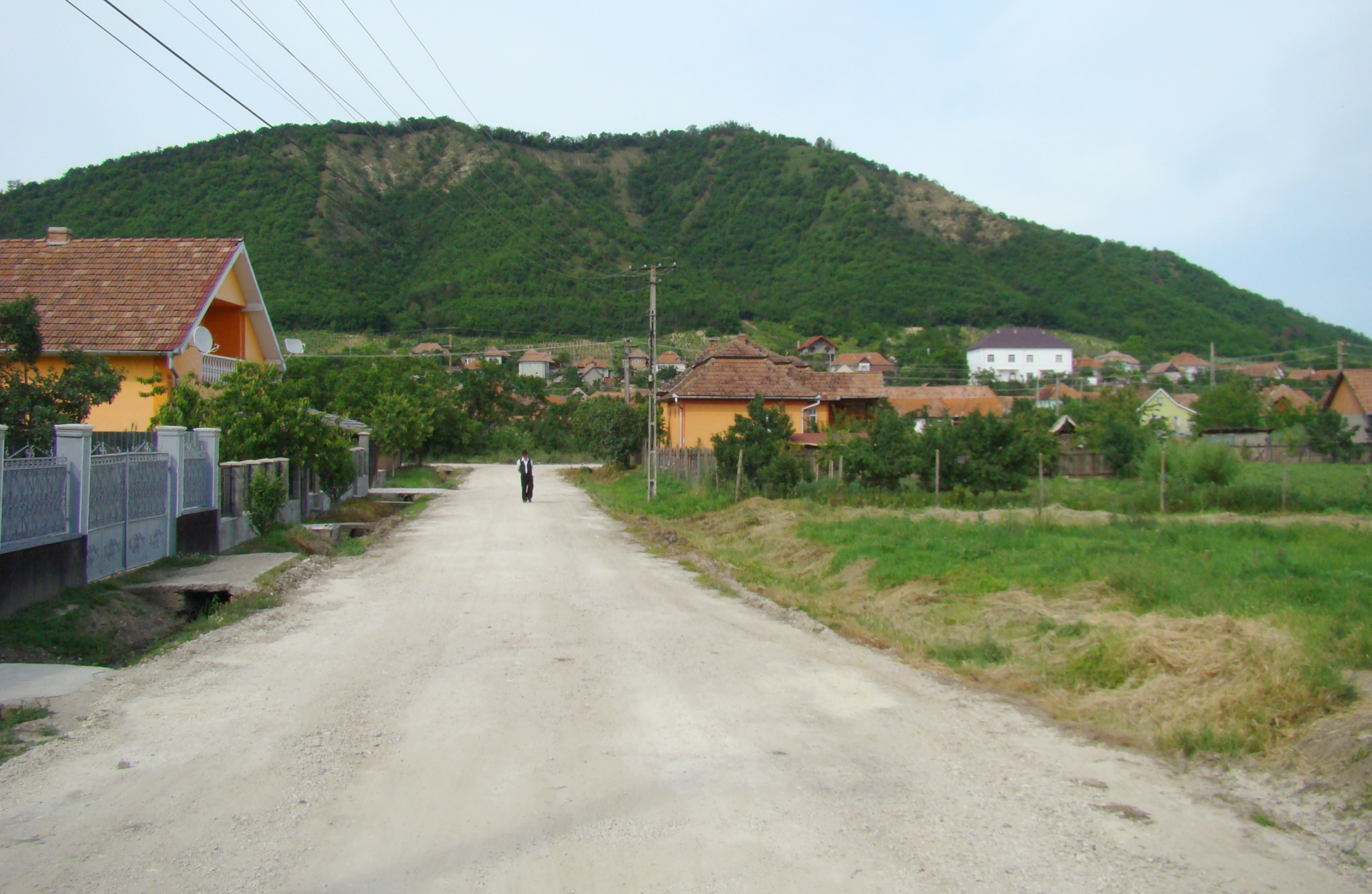
- View of Lopadea Nouă

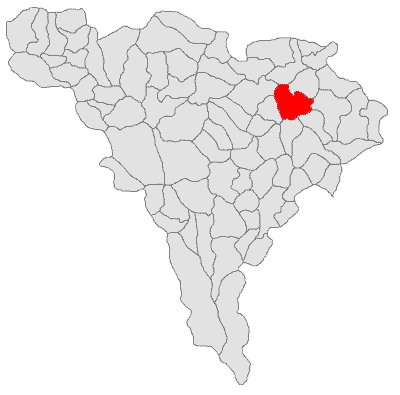
- Location in Alba County

- Location in Romania
- Coordinates: 46°17′N 23°49′E
- Country: Romania
- County: Alba

Government
  - Mayor (2020–2024): Marian-Cătălin Indreiu (PNL)
- Area: 70.76 km^{2} (27.32 sq mi)
- Elevation: 309 m (1,014 ft)
- Population (2021-12-01): 2,359
  - Density: 33.34/km^{2} (86.35/sq mi)
- Time zone: UTC+02:00 (EET)
  - Summer (DST): UTC+03:00 (EEST)
- Postal code: 517395
- Area code: (+40) 02 58
- Vehicle reg.: AB
- Website: primarialopadeanoua.ro

Lopadea Nouă (Hungarian: Magyarlapád; German: Schaufeldorf) is a commune located in Alba County, Transylvania, Romania. It is composed of eight villages: Asinip (Asszonynépe), Băgău (Magyarbagó), Beța (Magyarbece), Cicârd (Csengerpuszta), Ciuguzel (Fugad), Lopadea Nouă, Ocnișoara (Kisakna), and Odverem (Vadverem).

At the 2002 census, the commune had 3,001 inhabitants, of which 53% were Reformed and 45% Romanian Orthodox. At the 2011 census, there were 2,759 inhabitants, of which 52.5% were Hungarians and 47.1% Romanians. At the 2021 census, Lopadea Nouă had a population of 2,359, of which 51.25% were Hungarians and 44.6% Romanians.

Historical population
Year	Pop.	±%
1850	3,859	—
1900	4,442	+15.1%
1956	5,378	+21.1%
2002	3,001	−44.2%
2011	2,759	−8.1%
2021	2,359	−14.5%
Source: INS, Census data
