= Ivanjševci, Moravske Toplice =

Ivanjševci Jánosfa
- Location in Slovenia
- Coordinates: 46°45′47.42″N 16°17′18.99″E
- Country: Slovenia
- Traditional region: Prekmurje
- Statistical region: Mura
- Municipality: Moravske Toplice

Area
  - Total: 2.35 km^{2} (0.91 sq mi)
- Elevation: 254.8 m (836 ft)

Population (2002)
  - Total: 46

Ivanjševci (pronounced [iˈʋaːnʃɛu̯tsi]; Hungarian: Jánosfa) is a small village in the Municipality of Moravske Toplice in the Prekmurje region of Slovenia.

There is narrow wooden open post and beam belfry erected in 1923 in the centre of the village.
