= Prosenjakovci =

Prosenjakovci Pártosfalva
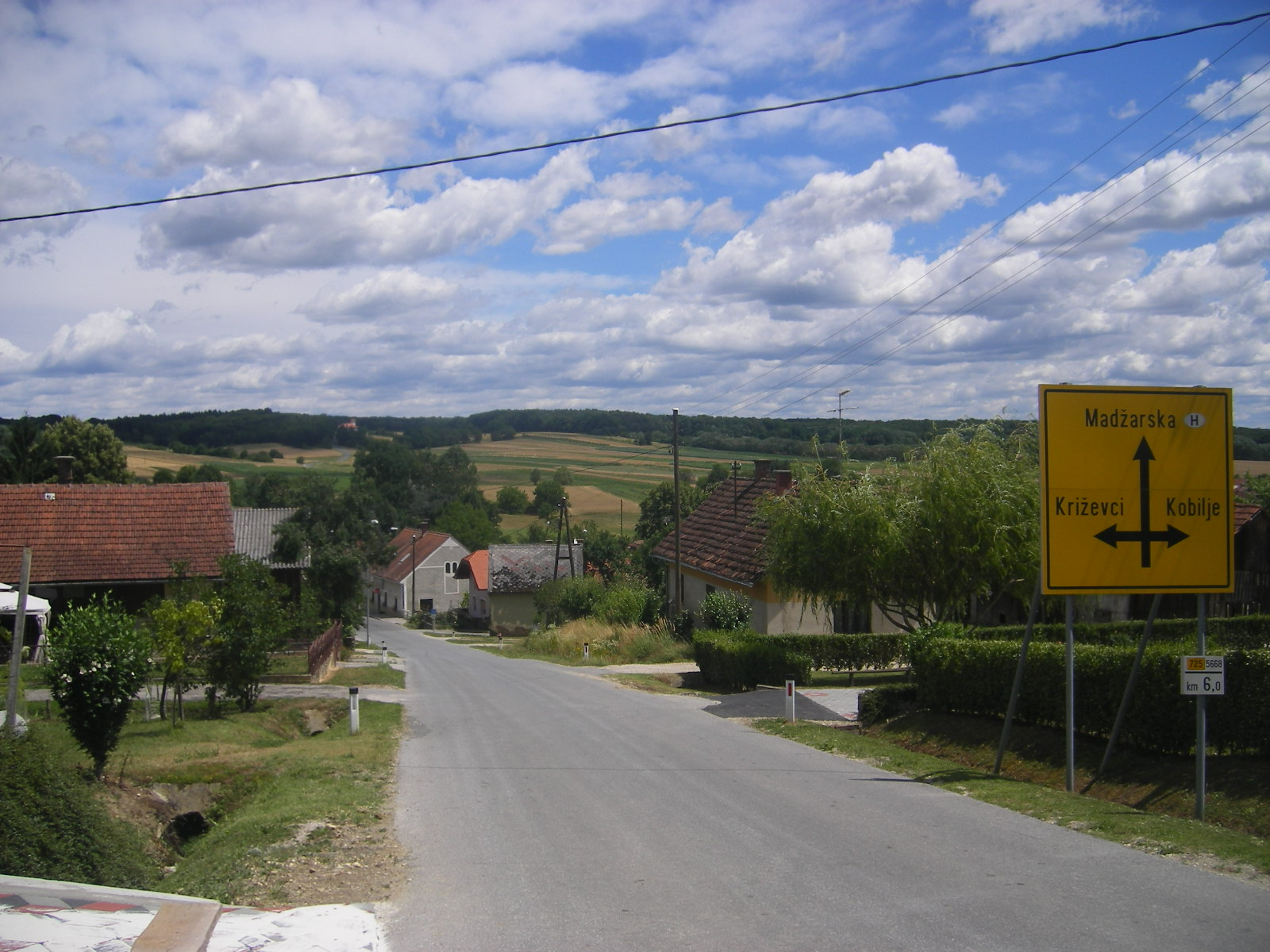

- Location in Slovenia
- Coordinates: 46°44′30.63″N 16°18′38.39″E
- Country: Slovenia
- Traditional region: Prekmurje
- Statistical region: Mura
- Municipality: Moravske Toplice

Area
  - Total: 6.67 km^{2} (2.58 sq mi)
- Elevation: 229.5 m (753 ft)

Population (2002)
  - Total: 187

Prosenjakovci (pronounced [pɾɔsɛˈnjaːkɔu̯tsi]; Hungarian: Pártosfalva) is a village in the Municipality of Moravske Toplice in the Prekmurje region of Slovenia, close to the border with Hungary.

== Clandestine grave ==
Prosenjakovci is the site of a clandestine grave associated with the Second World War or its aftermath. The Prosenjakovci Grave (Slovene: Grobišče Prosenjakovci) lies southwest of the village, behind the funeral chapel in the village cemetery. It contains the remains of a Hungarian that was shot while crossing the border illegally.

== Churches ==
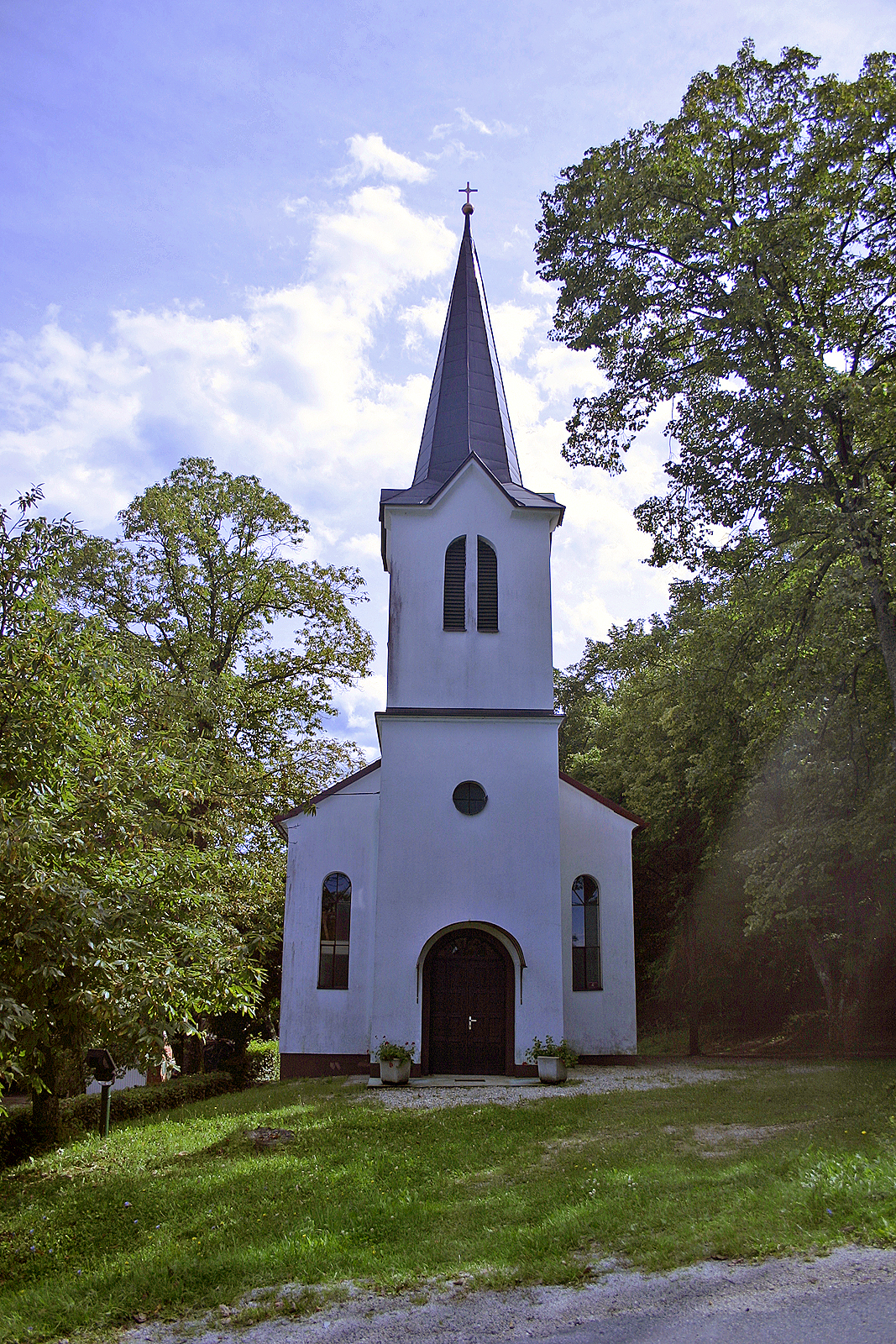
Lutheran chapel in Prosenjakovci

There are two small churches in the settlement, a Catholic chapel dedicated to Saint Joseph and a Lutheran chapel with a three-storey belfry, built in 1927.
