= Bogojina =

Bogojina Bagonya
- Location in Slovenia
- Coordinates: 46°40′28.3″N 16°16′49.94″E
- Country: Slovenia
- Traditional region: Prekmurje
- Statistical region: Mura
- Municipality: Moravske Toplice

Area
  - Total: 7.02 km^{2} (2.71 sq mi)
- Elevation: 183.4 m (602 ft)

Population (2002)
  - Total: 350

Bogojina (pronounced [bɔɡɔˈjiːna]; Hungarian: Bagonya, sometimes Zalabagonya) is a village east of Murska Sobota in the Prekmurje region of Slovenia. It lies in the Municipality of Moravske Toplice.

== Name ==
Bogojina was attested in written records in 1208 as Bogma (probably an abbreviation of Bogojina), and as Bagonya in 1322 and Bagona in 1403. The name is derived from the hypocorism Bogoj(e), meaning 'property/settlement belonging to Bogoj'.

== History ==
Three burial mounds north of the village testify to ancient settlement in the area. During work in the 1930s, local people found iron artifacts and Roman coins in the mounds, but these objects have since disappeared. The area suffered greatly from Ottoman attacks, which completely destroyed the neighboring village of Obrančavci—the name of this settlement is preserved in the Obrančavci Woods (Slovene: Obrankovski gozd) northeast of Bogojina. The settlement was Lutheran during the Reformation, but returned to Catholic control in 1669. Schooling was started in the village by Lutheran ministers in the 17th century, but the first schoolhouse was not built until 1827. The village received market rights in 1688; at that time, potters, weavers, and coopers were organized into guilds in the village. During the Second World War, a Partisan checkpoint was located at the Šavel Mill (Slovene: Šavlov mlin). A civic center was built in the village in 1959, and a fire station in 1974.

=== Clandestine grave ===
Bogojina was the site of a clandestine grave from the Second World War. The Cemetery Grave (Slovene: Grobišče na pokopališču) was located in the village cemetery, next to the entrance. It contained the remains of a German soldier. The remains were exhumed in an undocumented manner.

== Church ==
The parish church in Bogojina is dedicated to the Ascension. It was built between 1925 and 1927 and furnished in the 1950s according to plans by the Slovene architect Jože Plečnik. It is a church that was extensively rebuilt in the past and the original plan was to totally rebuild it in 1924, but Plečnik included the older structure in his new building. He used local clay pottery on the decoration for the ceiling of the nave.

There is also a small chapel in the settlement dedicated to Saint Urban. It was built in 1889.

== Notable people ==
Notable people that were born or lived in Bogojina include:

- Franc Bajlec (1902–1991), politician
- Iván Bassa (1875–1931), writer and politician
- Ivan Camplin (1912–2008), priest, poet, and journalist
- József Kossics (a.k.a. Jožef Košič) (1788–1867), writer, poet, and language reformer
- Jože Maučec (1907–1972), geographer and historian
- Jožef Smej (1922–2020), Catholic bishop
