= Church of St. Joseph the Worker, Belgrade =

Church of St. Joseph the Worker in Belgrade (Stara Karaburma)
- Parish Church of St. Joseph the Worker in Karaburma, Belgrade
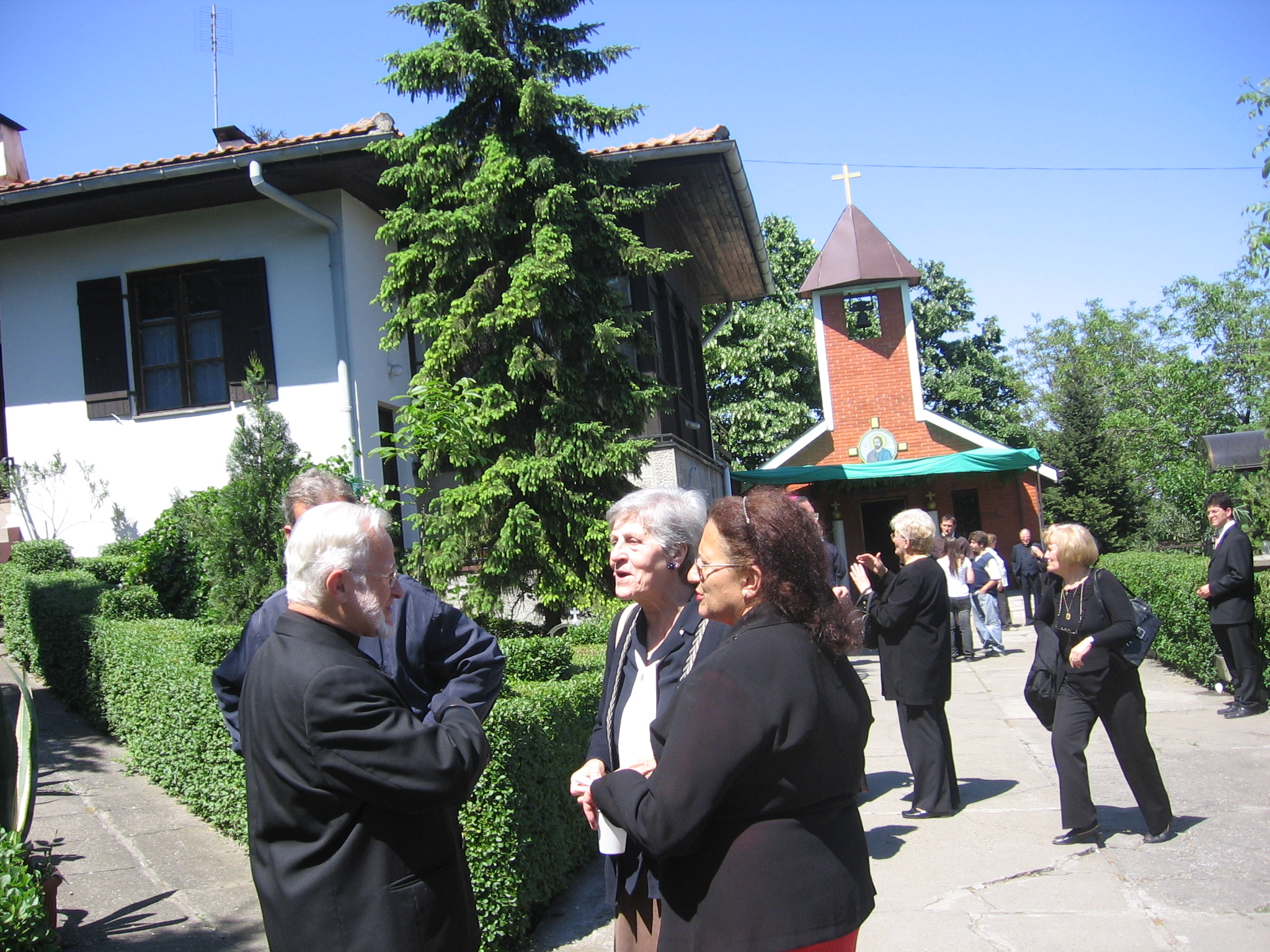
- Believers in conversation with Salesian inspector Alojzij Snoj
- Church of St. Joseph the Worker in Belgrade (Stara Karaburma)
- 44°49′00″N 20°30′09″E
- Location: Karaburma
- Country: Serbia
- Denomination: Roman Catholic
- Website: http://kc.org.rs/sv-josip-radnik-beograd/

History
- Founded: January 1, 1972
- Founder: Archdiocese of Belgrade
- Dedication: Saint Joseph

Architecture
- Functional status: parish church
- Architect(s): Ivan Žnidaršič; Vlado Žnidaršič
- Architectural type: modern architecture
- Style: hall
- Groundbreaking: 1983
- Completed: May 1, 1991

Specifications
- Capacity: 100
- Height: 10
- Materials: brick, concrete

Administration
- Metropolis: Belgrade
- Archdiocese: Belgrade
- Deanery: Belgrade
- Parish: Saint Joseph the Worker

The Church of St. Joseph the Worker (Serbian: Црква Светог Јосифа Радника, Croatian: Crkva Svetog Josipa Radnika, Slovene: Cerkev Svetega Jožefa Delavca) is a Catholic parish church located in the Belgrade settlement of Old Karaburma, dedicated to Saint Joseph. The Parish of St. Joseph the Worker has been assigned to the Salesian Order since its establishment in 1972; it was taken over by the Roman Catholic Archdiocese of Belgrade after the death of the last parish priest Ciril Zajec in 2011.

It is located in Stara Karaburma at Pribojska 23, Municipality of Palilula, Belgrade. This is the youngest Catholic parish in Belgrade. The parish was founded on 1 January 1972 by Archbishop of Belgrade Bukatko; next to the parish house (built in 1960), is the church, which was completed in 1991.

== History ==
=== Catholics in Karaburma ===
The intention to establish a parish and to build a church in Karaburma appeared as early as 1940, during Ujčič's episcopate. His predecessor Rodić gave the initiative and saw the completion of the construction of many of the Catholic churches in the Belgrade area, such as St. Anthony of Padua on the Red Cross, St. Cyril and Methodius on Čukarica, St. Peter the Apostle in Makedonska Street and the so-called "French Church" on Vračar, which, however, reached only the first phase of development with the completion of a smaller church – among other things due to the otherwise unsuitable terrain, which the city authorities really helped to rehabilitate and properly arrange during the time of Hočevar, so that the renovated church could become a new cathedral.

In 1942, they had already purchased and prepared suitable terrain in Stara Karaburma and collected some building materials. The new parish was supposed to be taken over by the Lazarists, but they had already decided on Banovo Brdo. World War II prevented the construction of the church itself and the establishment of the parish; immediately after the war, the new communist atheist government completely made such an idea impossible: they confiscated the collected building materials, nationalized the land and built a supermarket on it – namely on the corner of Sime Šolaja and Danilo Ilića streets.

In 1964, Gabrijel Bukatko took over the administration of the Belgrade Archdiocese, who wanted to fulfill the wish of his predecessor Ujčič at all costs. Since he knew the Salesians well – since in 1959 he ceded his two-story palace in Križevci to them for the benefit of many young people – and because they also administered the central parish of Christ the King, he sent a request to the inspectorate in Ljubljana to establish a new parish in this area. Most of the young residents belonged to the working class, and therefore the patron saint of the new parish was Saint Joseph the Worker, whose feast day is May 1; the then national Labor Day came as a day off for prayer.

Saint Joseph is a biblical figure, and is celebrated by both Orthodox and Catholics. The Eastern Church calls him "Joseph the Just", while the Catholic Church calls him "Saint Joseph, Spouse of the Virgin Mary", and also "Saint Joseph the Worker". His feast day in the Serbian Orthodox Church is celebrated on December 31 according to the Julian calendar, while Catholics celebrate it twice according to the Gregorian calendar: on March 19 and May 1. It was an extremely clever move by Pope Pius XII in 1955, to bring the Church closer to workers and vice versa, but also to take away the communists' monopoly over the celebration of May Day as a workers' holiday.

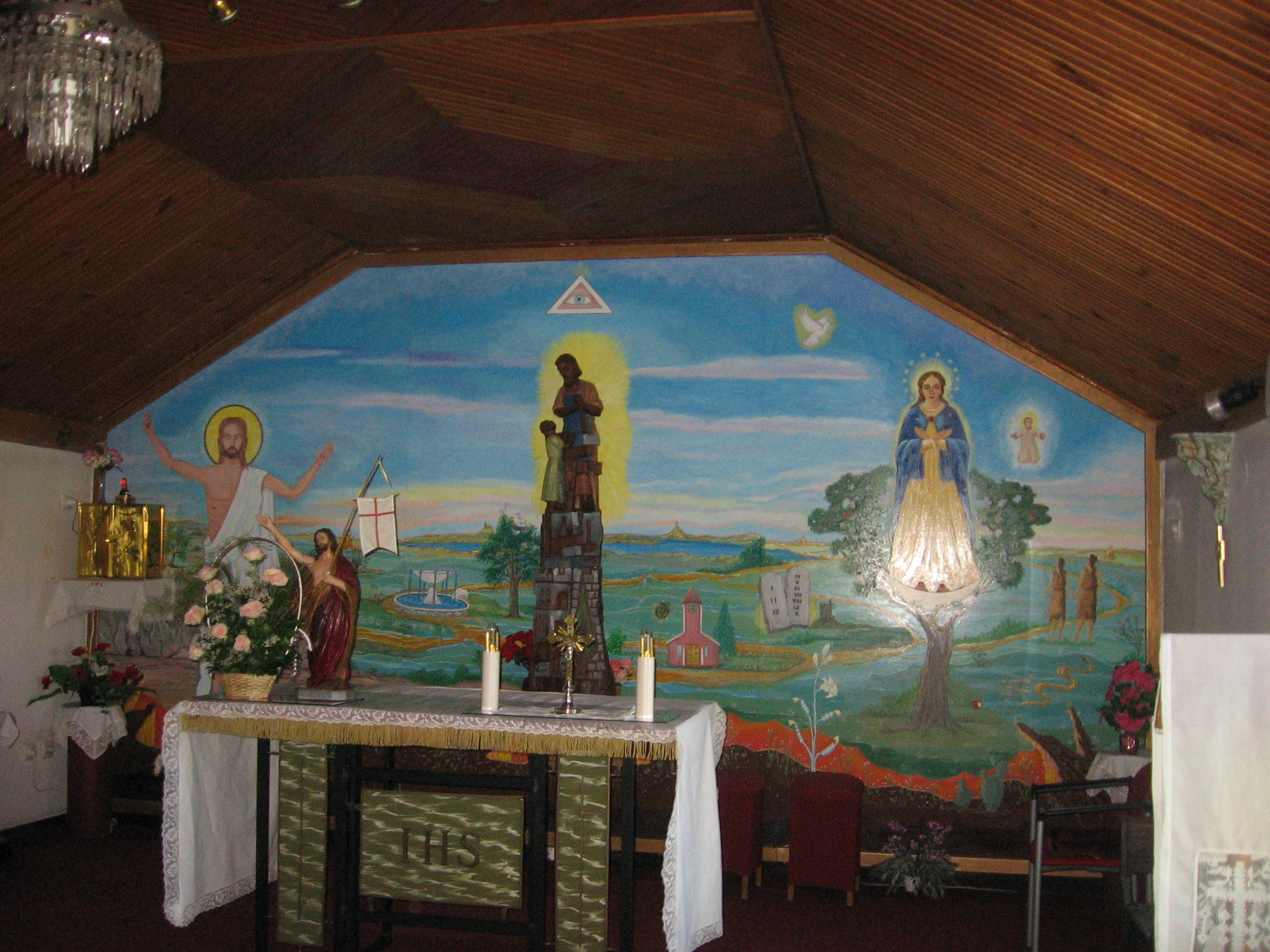
The interior of the church shows God's plan of salvation history.

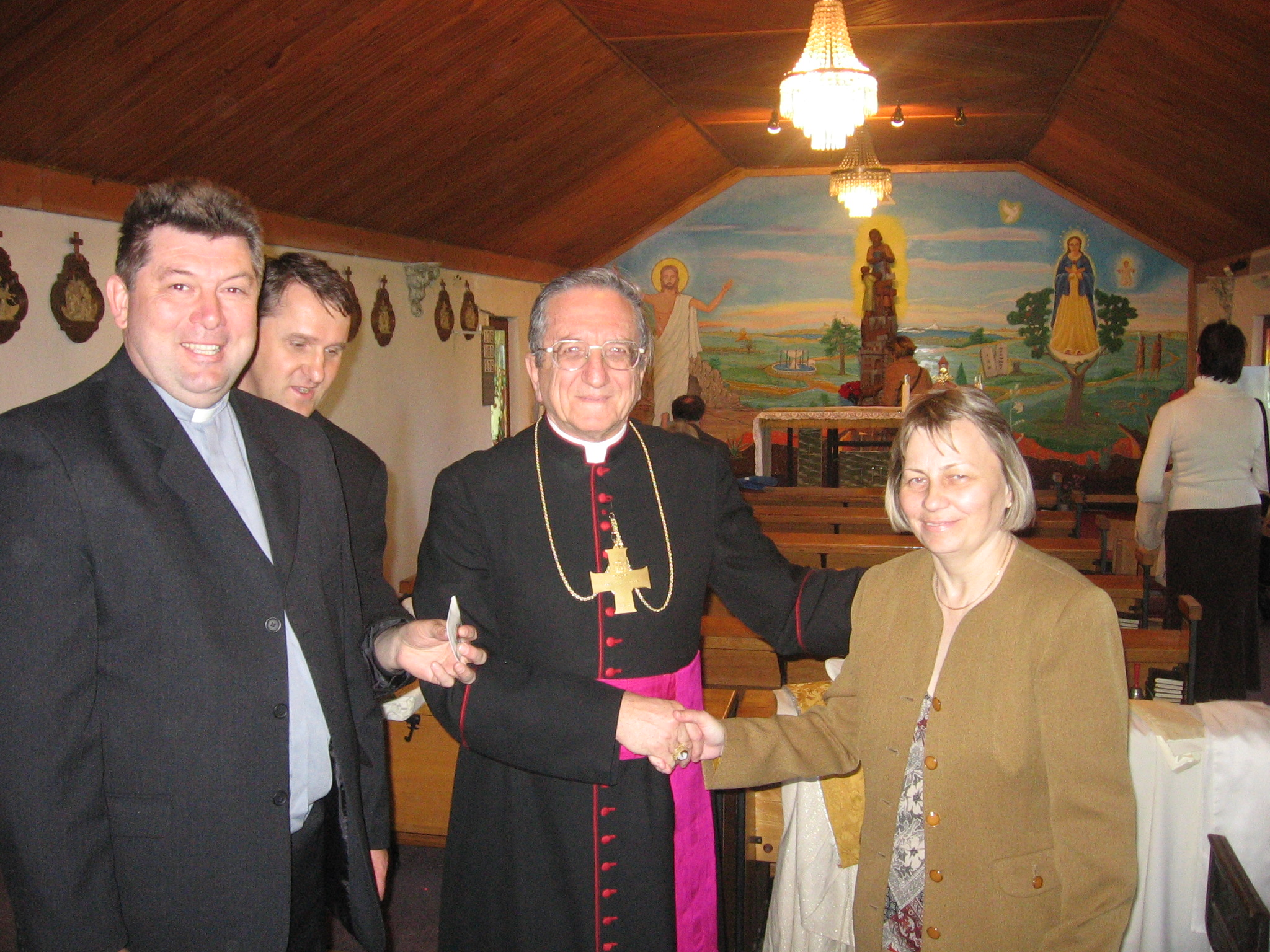
In 2007, the ceremony was led by the Apostolic Nuncio Sbarbaro with the concelebration of priests and religious and the assistance of deacon Zoltán Sándor.

In 1950, construction began next to the "Old Karaburma" to build the "New Settlement", which was initially divided into individual pavilions; later, the new streets were given their own names. In the Catholic registry books of the parish of St. Peter, we find the street of Patrisa Lumumba in 1962, Marijana Gregoran in 1964, Garsi Lorka and Dr. Đoka Jovanović in 1966, then Mirijevski bulevar in 1970, etc. Thus, the entire city of "Nova Karaburma" gradually emerged in this area with more than 100,000 inhabitants, for whom it was necessary to provide a new parish center; it was calculated that at least 3% of the inhabitants were Catholics, as its first chaplain Janez Jelen wrote in the Chronicle of the Parish of St. Joseph the Worker. It should be noted right away that this estimate was optimistically far exaggerated and it would be much more realistic, as he himself later realized through visits to families with the blessing of houses, that perhaps there were not that many Catholics there – perhaps half of them had no contact with the Church at all. However, it seems that their share does not exceed 1% or is still well below that. Among them, most were Slovenes and Croats, but a few families were Kosovo Albanians and Hungarians; more than half were formed by mixed marriages. For example, the first Christian and former bus driver Dragiša Živković was a Serb by nationality, who had a Croatian wife; similarly, Anton Vratuša's devote relative Anton Forjan, who regularly read the reading at mass – sometimes also in Slovenian.

In terms of church institutions, Karaburma has a somewhat turbulent history. As early as the 1960s, the Orthodox wanted to build a church in the middle of newly emerging settlement of "New Karaburma", but the "working class" held demonstrations: "We don't want a church, we want a kindergarten, we want a cinema!" and instead of the church, they built the "Slavica Cinema", which is falling into disrepair today. But due to its attraction it achieved its goal – to prevent the construction of a church for which the land had already been purchased. Therefore, Catholics managed to get to "Red" Karaburma through a back door at a time when new churches or mosques could only be dreamed of. Today, the "Bioskop Slavica" is still decaying, despite all the "ad hoc" attempts to revive it, as apart from promises, nothing has changed in this regard in the last decade, despite the wishes of some enthusiasts.

=== Slovene nuns ===
Slovenian nuns of the Daughters of Charity (usmiljenke) purchased a small house at Sime Šolaja Street 39, which was converted into the first public chapel. The first mass was held on 22 June 1965; the care of the house was taken over by sisters Mehtilda and Matilda Šumah, who soon after moved to a newly purchased building with a chapel on Pribojska Street, but in the seventies, for unknown reasons, they returned to their home community at Višegradska 23.

After them, the Sisters of Charity (Marijine sestre) under the leadership of Slovenian nun Digna moved into the empty house on Sime Šolaja street; some of them were employed in the civil service; they also took care of the parish household and also successfully taught religious education to a small number of children and youth. The nuns included young women from Bosnia, survivors of World War II. As a result of a priest's support for post-conciliar renewal, some in the parish left the community, while the Slovene nuns left for Slovenia. A worse blow was the departure and marriage of the last two monks, because as a result the Assumptionists had to close their only community, which they had had for many years in the former Yugoslavia.

=== Public chapel ===
On September 7, 1967, a public chapel was opened at Pribojska 23 in the building where the rectory is today. The chapel in an otherwise beautiful villa made of brick and stone with a roof covered with Dalmatian beaver, which the city built in 1960 for the film actor Milivoje Živanović – but which he never moved into – was opened for worship by the aforementioned Archbishop Bukatko. The first pastor was appointed as the then pastor of Cathedral of Christ the King – Slovenian Salesian Herman Habič, for whose transfer to the new place the Latin saying circulated among the clergy: "promovetur quod amovetur", since he had to move from the central parish – where he was replaced by the diocesan priest Anton Hočevar – to the outskirts of the city, while the bishop still kept his chaplain Franc Jamnik as a driver.

The chapel was first used for mass every Wednesday, then also on Sundays, and finally every day. The parish was established on January 1, 1972, by archdiocesan decree under no. 421/31.XII.1971. The house was bought by the Salesian Inspectorate in Ljubljana, which borrowed money from the Archdiocese of Belgrade for this purpose and returned the 70,000 dinars borrowed to the archdiocese on September 14, 1972; there is also a certificate of this with the archdiocesan stamp and the archbishop's signature in the Parish Chronicle on page 6; however, it is possible that the total purchase price was significantly higher and that the archdiocese also contributed a good share.

The building is a basement villa, built of wood, stone and brick and surrounded by various fruit and ornamental trees, which were purchased in a nursery in Jajinci; among them is spruce, the rare "concolor", and "Himalayan pine" with the same properties; cherries, sour cherries, walnuts and a few other fruit trees were brought from the "Anton Jelen" nursery in Šentilj near Velenje by the first chaplain Janez. However, the same problems that the neighboring building by the sculptor Krstić had, as well as almost all buildings built on the northern slope of the steep and landslide-prone Zvezdarna hill, soon became apparent: the land almost everywhere slides dangerously towards the Danube and people joked that they could wake up in the middle of a flood in the morning. The representative building was built on a pronounced landslide and, so to speak, without foundations, and over time dangerous cracks began to appear; perhaps that is why, shortly after its purchase, the first owner – the Indonesian Embassy – sold it to the second owner, a construction company, from which the Slovenian Salesians bought it. The first parish priest, the dean of Belgrade and the archbishop's consultor Habič successfully renovated it in the fall of 1975 by strengthening the foundations, building a basement and adding curbs. The demanding work was carried out by the private construction company Stamenković from Crna Trava.

A Belgrade entrepeneur, known as "boss Stamenko" ("gazda Stamenko"), carried out the construction, and worked on repairs and construction in several Catholic parishes. Although they initially suspected groundwater, thorough professional investigations did not detect it. At the same time, for the same reasons, the school gymnasium some three hundred meters away on the same street had to be completely renovated, which had also dangerously cracked due to a landslide.

==== Permission for church ====
The parish eventually received permission for two temporary garages, which they had built on a reinforced concrete foundation due to the steep terrain and had a basement; thus, in 1986, a hall was created below as a kind of crypt. In 1989, his successor, the Slovenian Salesian Ciril Zajec, began building a new church above the hall, which had previously served as a chapel for some time. At first, the authorities threatened to demolish it. At that time, however, great social changes and the so-called "Fall of Communism" were taking place throughout Yugoslavia. On the one hand, this was followed by the Disintegration of Yugoslavia with the civil war, on the other hand, all religious denominations were able to breathe more freely, and this was also the case in Belgrade: The Church of St. Joseph the Worker finally received a building permit on December 3, 1990, and was ceremonially opened for blessing on May 1, 1991. It was ceremonially blessed by the then Archbishop of Belgrade, Franc Perko. A few years later, however, the priest Zajec, who had previously built a new church in Nikšić, had a simple bell tower built next to the "Belgrade Beauty on the Green Karaburma" – as he liked to call it – inviting people to holy mass.

== Religious life ==
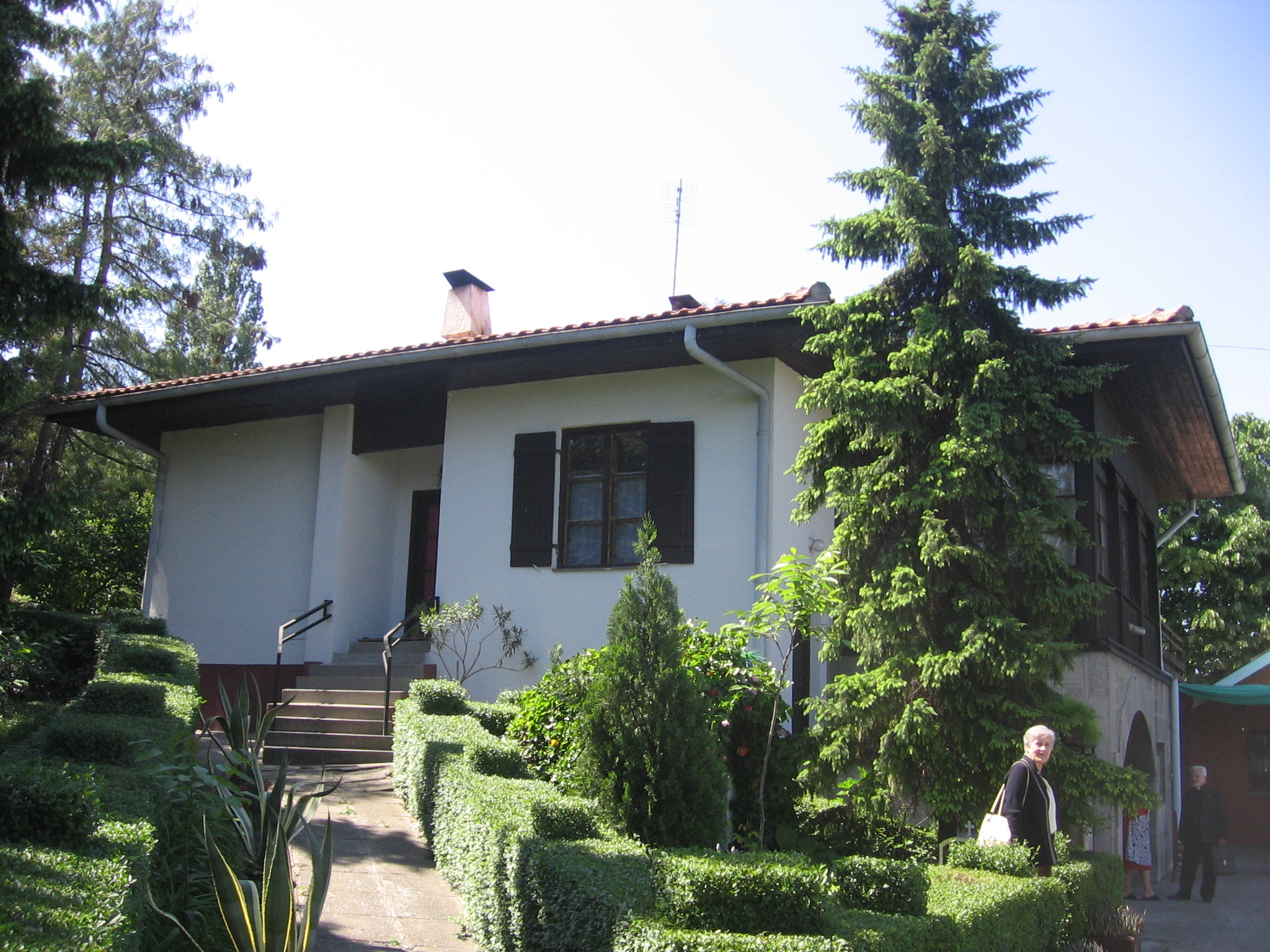
Villa in Stara Karaburma Belgrade made for the film actor Milivoje Živanović (1960s)

=== A place for singing, prayer and peace ===
The church was designed by Belgrade engineers Ivan Žnidaršič and his nephew Vlado Žnidaršič, in a simple, hall-like style, so that it could best serve its purpose – to act as a place for singing, prayer and meditation – and so that the faithful would feel comfortable in it. The Church of St. Joseph the Worker is not large, but it also has a folding altar and tabernacle – a gift from archbishop Bukatko from the archdiocesan chapel. The entire presbytery was painted by a Montenegrin naive painter and there is enough space in it on ordinary Sundays and holidays: for prayer, in good weather, mass is celebrated in the courtyard in front of the church, which is filled with pilgrims from the entire Belgrade area. The church is certainly attractive and surrounded by greenery, so much so that its builder, "Rev. Cyril", preferred to affectionately call it "The Belgrade Beauty on the Green Karaburma".

The arrival of the new harmonium brought great joy to the faithful. For many years, organist Olga Malbašič and head sister Angela Zorko came to Karaburma, especially after a harmonium in good condition was brought by truck from Ravna Reka. After the sudden death of the last Salesian pastor Ciril Zajc, the Archdiocese had big plans for this parish, or rather the parish building, which was very suitable for spiritual exercises, but which could only be partially realized.

=== Wednesday is dedicated to Saint Joseph ===
However, there are already established folk devotions here. Every Wednesday, worshippers of Saint Joseph used to gather in the chapel, but today in the church, and recommend themselves and the entire parish to his protection with a prayer in his honor "O Josipe, oče sveti..." ("O Joseph, holy father...") , which was also faithfully prayed by Anica, who from the very beginning, with a few other devout women, came to mass in the chapel in the house every morning; her brother was the famous Salesian missionary Ivan Cigan, who worked for a short time in India.

=== Parish Blessing on Labor Day ===
The biggest ceremony is held every year on the day of the parish patron, the actual blessing on May 1, when the church is closed and labor is not allowed; at that time, pilgrims come in large numbers from all over Belgrade and most often the mass is held on the platform in front of the church, as the church would be too small for everyone. From the front of the church there is a view of the Danube and its surrounding city.

The traditional pilgrimage in 2022 brought together the parish community, numerous pilgrims from all over Belgrade, as well as families from the Neocatechumenal Way: they fervently prayed the rosary and participated in the solemn service led by Archbishop Stanislav Hočevar, with the concelebration of the local parish priest Grzegorz Chudek and the city priests.

In his sermon, the Archbishop looked back on the miraculous victory of Christians over the Turks in the Battle of Lepanto on October 7, 1571, which was brought about by the prayer of the rosary, according to Pope Pius V. Contemporaries, however, "did not know how to appreciate this miracle, and envy reigned among Christian nations, which strengthened the wicked in their wickedness and prevented the good from taking advantage of the victory to gain freedom for the enslaved Christians." Similarly, today's "man does not know how to live his dignity and listens more to the devil than to God, listens more to his own heart than to God’s, and thus easily falls under the power of his passions, especially selfishness and hatred." Failure to accept the word of God brings with it "the acceptance of unrest, misunderstanding, hatred, and war." Following the example of Saint Joseph, we can nevertheless glorify God if we withdraw from worldly noise and in silence contemplate and accept God's plan for us. "Let's follow his example as God's angels, who spread understanding and forgiveness, love and cooperation around us" – said the chief shepherd, who remarked that the call for peace and reconciliation is also intended for future generations.

== See also ==
- Belgrade interwar Christian architecture
- Archdiocese of Belgrade
- List of popes
