= Gornji Slaveči =

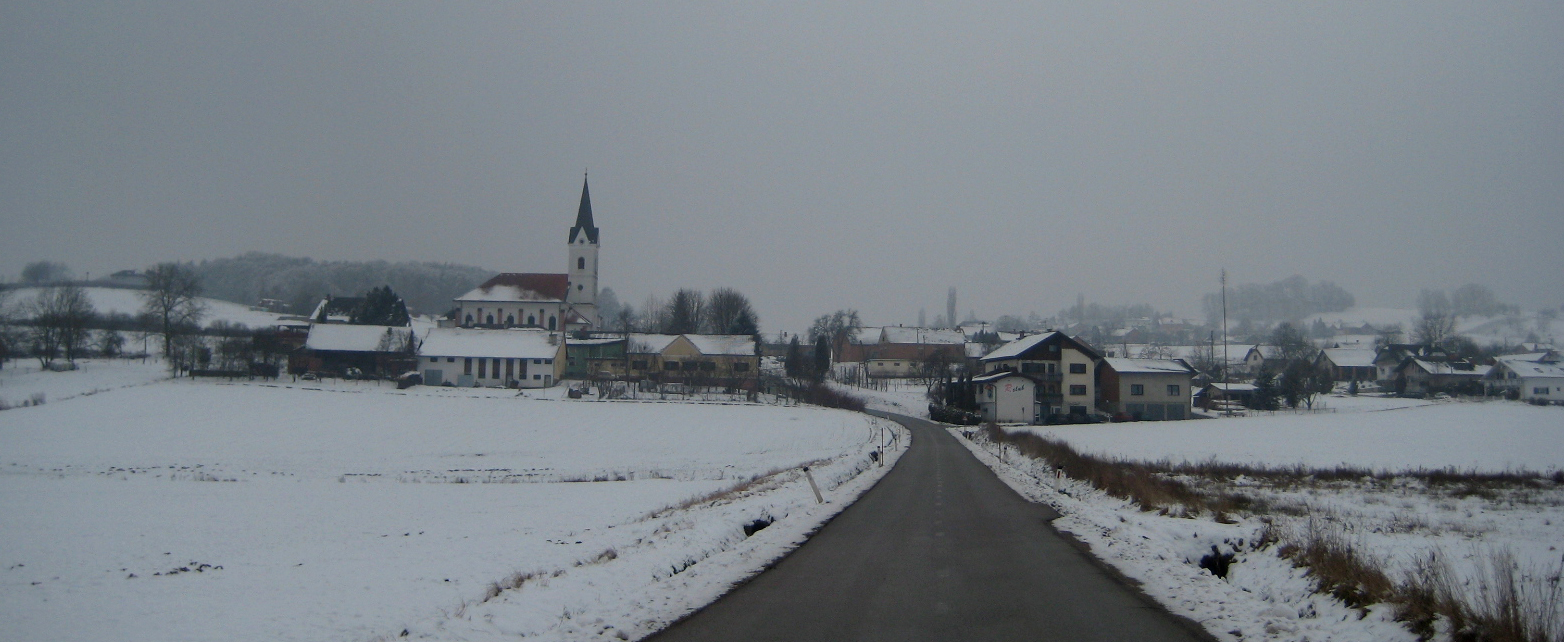

- Location in Slovenia
- Coordinates: 46°48′56.96″N 16°3′56.05″E
- Country: Slovenia
- Traditional region: Prekmurje
- Statistical region: Mura
- Municipality: Kuzma

Area
  - Total: 4.71 km^{2} (1.82 sq mi)
- Elevation: 260.2 m (854 ft)

Population (2019)
  - Total: 437

Gornji Slaveči (pronounced [ˈɡoːɾnji ˈslaːʋɛtʃi]; Hungarian: Felsőcsalogány, German: Ober Slabitsch) is a village in the Municipality of Kuzma in the Prekmurje region of Slovenia.

== Name ==
The name Gornji Slaveči (literally, 'upper Slaveči') contrasts with the name Dolnji Slaveči (literally, 'lower Slaveči'), a village in the neighboring Municipality of Grad. Dolnji Slaveči lies about 20 meters (66 ft) lower in elevation than Gornji Slaveči.

== History ==
Under the Austro-Hungarian Empire, the village was part of the lordship of Grad. Until 1920 Gornji Slaveči belonged to Hungary, and after the Treaty of Trianon it belonged to Yugoslavia. During the Second World War it was annexed by Hungary, and after 1945 it belonged to Yugoslavia again. Since the foundation of the Republic of Slovenia it has belonged to Slovenia.

== Church ==
There is a large Lutheran church in the settlement. It was built in 1928.

== Notable residents ==
- Ludvik Čurman/Csurmann (1913–1943), Lutheran priest and resistance fighter in the Second World War, died in Russia
- Rudolf Čurman/Csurmann (1898–1945), farmer and resistance fighter in the Second World War, died in Schörzingen
