= Radovci =

Radovci may refer to:

- Radovci, Grad, a village in the Municipality of Grad, Slovenia
- Radovci, Požega, a village in the municipality of Požega, Serbia
