= Trdkova =

Trdkova Türke
- Interactive map of Trdkova
- Location in Slovenia
- Coordinates: 46°51′10.19″N 16°7′40.57″E
- Country: Slovenia
- Traditional region: Prekmurje
- Statistical region: Mura
- Municipality: Kuzma

Area
  - Total: 5.01 km^{2} (1.93 sq mi)
- Elevation: 368.8 m (1,210 ft)

Population (2019)
  - Total: 167

Trdkova (pronounced [ˈtəɾtkɔʋa]; Hungarian: Türke) is a village in the Municipality of Kuzma in the Prekmurje region of Slovenia. It lies right on the border between Slovenia, Austria, and Hungary.

There is a small chapel-shrine with a belfry in the village. It is dedicated to Saints Cyril and Methodius.
