= Dolnji Slaveči =

Dolnji Slaveči Alsócsalogány
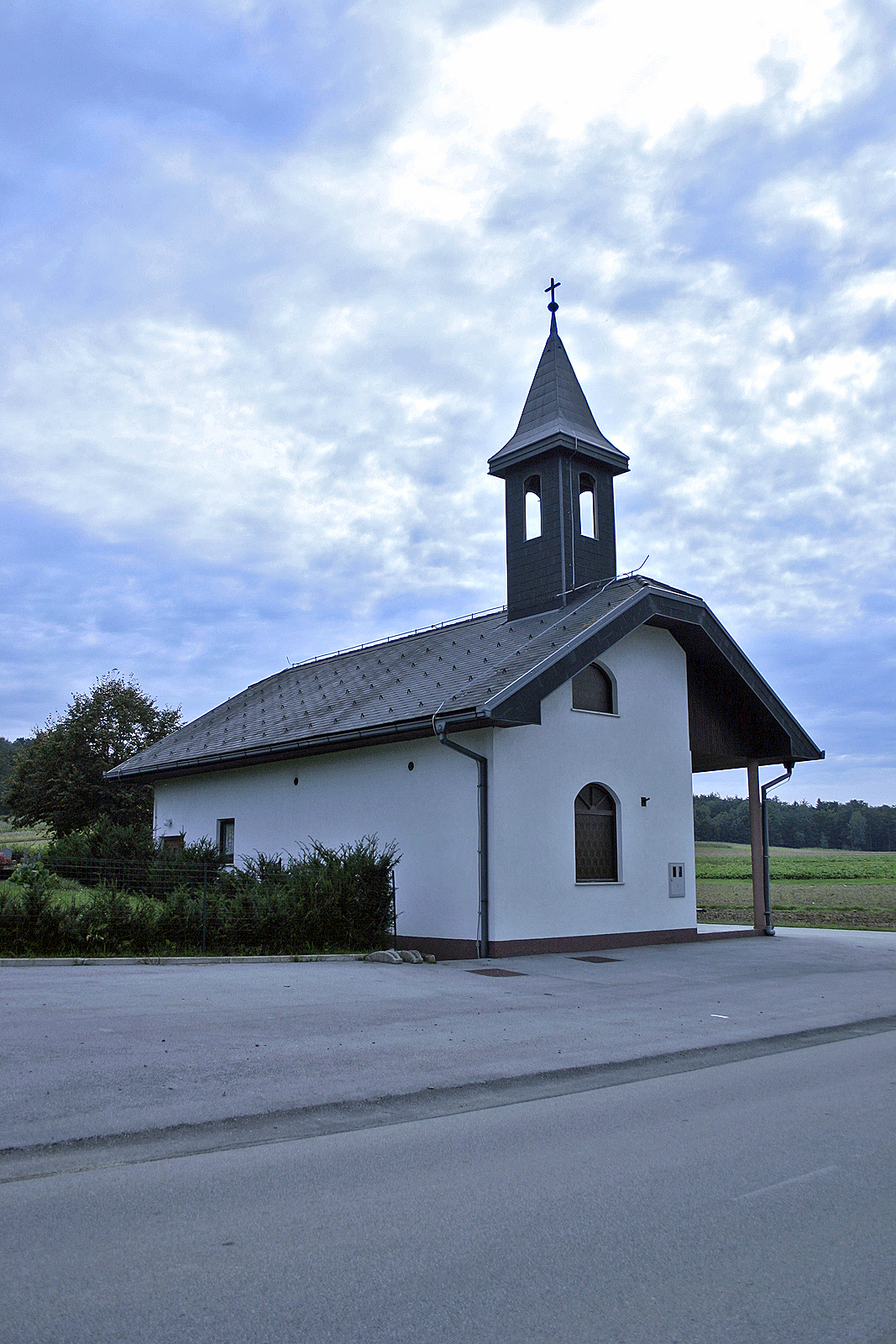

- Location in Slovenia
- Coordinates: 46°47′45.93″N 16°4′7.38″E
- Country: Slovenia
- Traditional region: Prekmurje
- Statistical region: Mura
- Municipality: Grad

Area
  - Total: 5.52 km^{2} (2.13 sq mi)
- Elevation: 239.7 m (786 ft)

Population (2020)
  - Total: 397
  - Density: 71.9/km^{2} (186/sq mi)

Dolnji Slaveči (pronounced [ˈdoːlnji ˈslaːʋɛtʃi]; Hungarian: Alsócsalogány) is a village in the Municipality of Grad in the Prekmurje region of northeastern Slovenia.

== Name ==
The name Dolnji Slaveči (literally, 'lower Slaveči') contrasts with the name Gornji Slaveči (literally, 'upper Slaveči'), a village in the neighboring Municipality of Kuzma. Gornji Slaveči lies about 20 meters (66 ft) higher in elevation than Dolnji Slaveči.

== Notable people ==
Notable people that were born or lived in Dolnji Slaveči include:

- Miklós Küzmics (1737–1804), Hungarian Slovene writer and translator
- Anton Vratuša (1915–2017), politician and diplomat
