= Dolič, Kuzma =

Dolič Völgyköz
- Location in Slovenia
- Coordinates: 46°50′2.44″N 16°5′33.62″E
- Country: Slovenia
- Traditional region: Prekmurje
- Statistical region: Mura
- Municipality: Kuzma

Area
  - Total: 6.11 km^{2} (2.36 sq mi)
- Elevation: 268.9 m (882 ft)

Population (2019)
  - Total: 372

Dolič (pronounced [dɔˈliːtʃ]; Hungarian: Völgyköz, German: Dollitsch) is a village in the Municipality of Kuzma in the Prekmurje region of Slovenia.
