= Matjaševci =

Matjaševci Szentmátyás
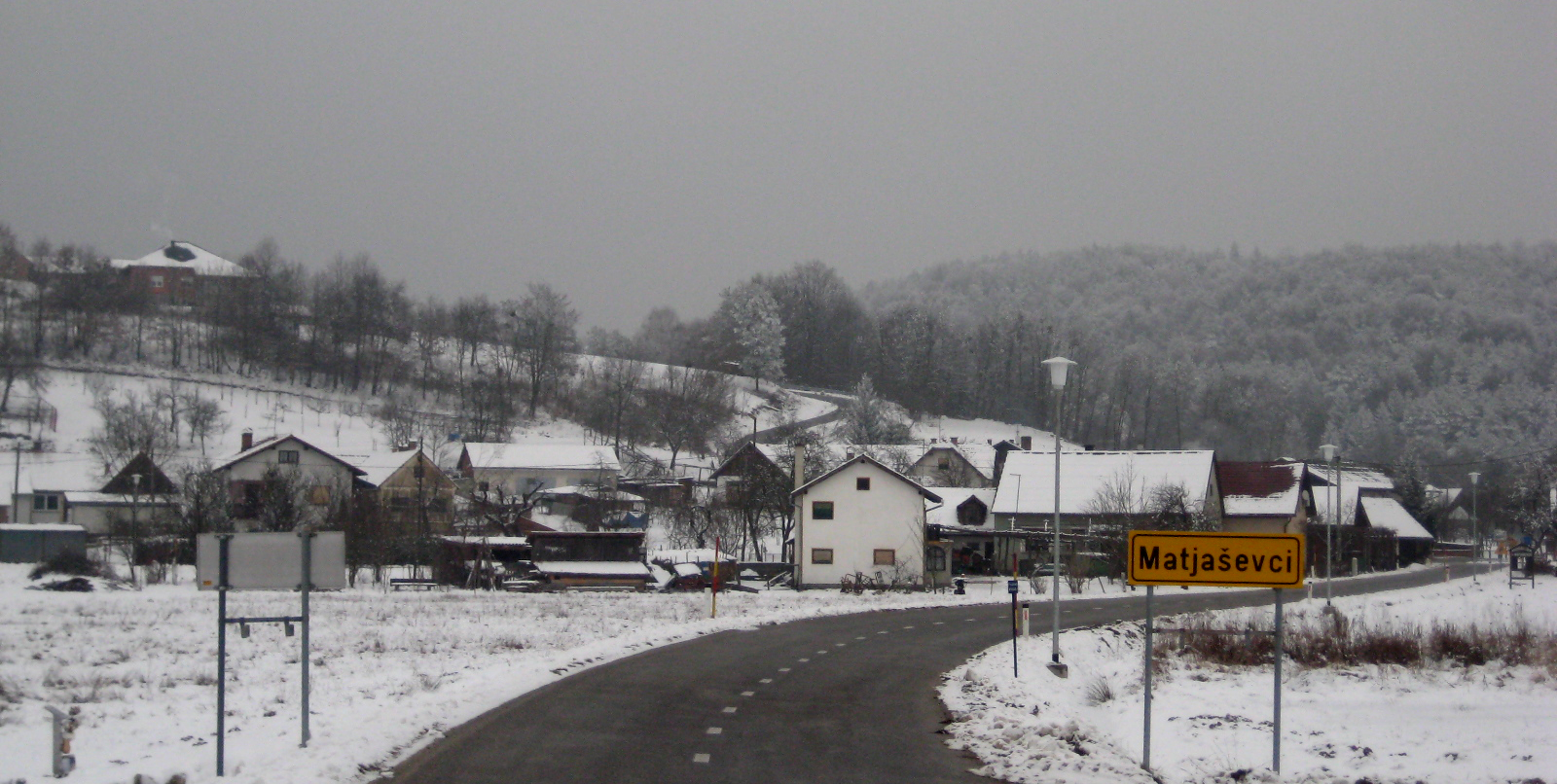

- Location in Slovenia
- Coordinates: 46°50′50.27″N 16°5′44.03″E
- Country: Slovenia
- Traditional region: Prekmurje
- Statistical region: Mura
- Municipality: Kuzma

Area
  - Total: 3.4 km^{2} (1.3 sq mi)
- Elevation: 271.2 m (890 ft)

Population (2019)
  - Total: 163

Matjaševci (pronounced [maˈtjaːʃɛu̯tsi]; Hungarian: Szentmátyás) is a village in the Municipality of Kuzma in the Prekmurje region of Slovenia.
