= Kovačevci, Grad =

Kovačevci
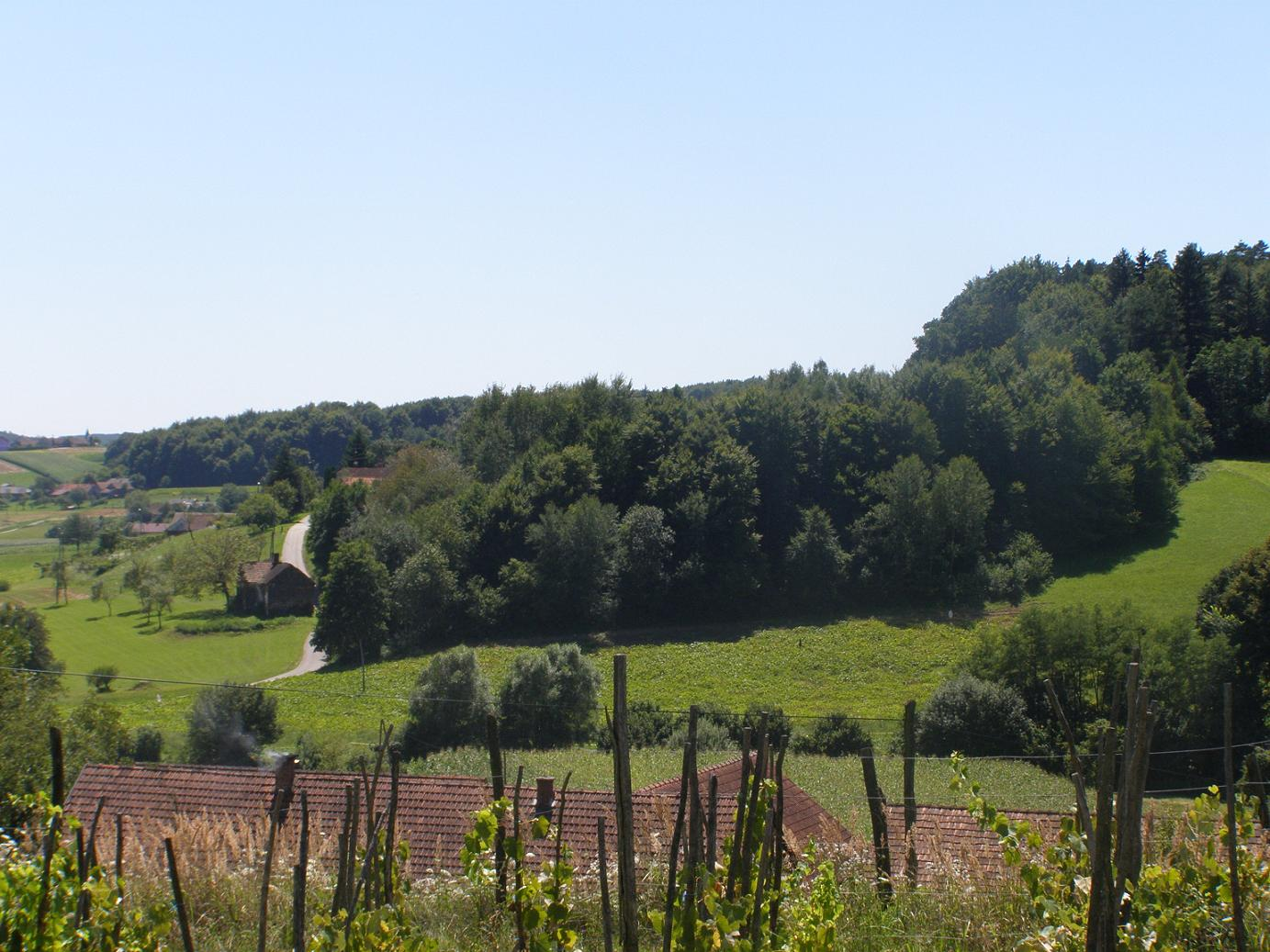

- Location in Slovenia
- Coordinates: 46°47′14.55″N 16°7′24.32″E
- Country: Slovenia
- Traditional region: Prekmurje
- Statistical region: Mura
- Municipality: Grad

Area
  - Total: 3.11 km^{2} (1.20 sq mi)
- Elevation: 296.1 m (971 ft)

Population (2020)
  - Total: 95
  - Density: 31/km^{2} (79/sq mi)

Kovačevci (pronounced [kɔˈʋaːtʃɛu̯tsi]; in older sources also Kovačovci, Hungarian: Vaskovácsi) is a village in the Municipality of Grad in the Prekmurje region of northeastern Slovenia.
