= Janez Zemljarič =

Slovenian politician (1928–2022)

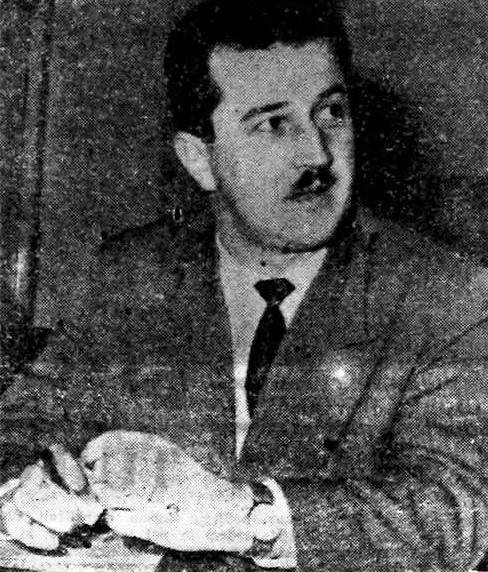
Janez Zemljarič

Janez Zemljarič (30 December 1928 – 30 December 2022) was a Yugoslavian Slovenian politician who served as the president of the Executive Council of the Socialist Republic of Slovenia from July 1980 to 23 May 1984.

Zemljarič was born in Bukovci, and was a member of the League of Communists of Slovenia. He was preceded by Anton Vratuša and succeeded by Dušan Šinigoj.

Zemljarič died on his 94th birthday on 30 December 2022.
