= Motovilci =

- Location in Slovenia
- Coordinates: 46°46′38.83″N 16°3′38.7″E
- Country: Slovenia
- Traditional region: Prekmurje
- Statistical region: Mura
- Municipality: Grad

Area
  - Total: 3.51 km^{2} (1.36 sq mi)
- Elevation: 231.4 m (759 ft)

Population (2020)
  - Total: 263
  - Density: 74.9/km^{2} (194/sq mi)

Motovilci (pronounced [mɔtɔˈʋiːltsi] or [mɔtɔˈʋiːu̯tsi]; Hungarian: Mottolyád, Prekmurje Slovene: Motovöuci) is a village in the Municipality of Grad in the Prekmurje region of northeastern Slovenia.
