= Anton Vratuša =

Slovenian politician and diplomat

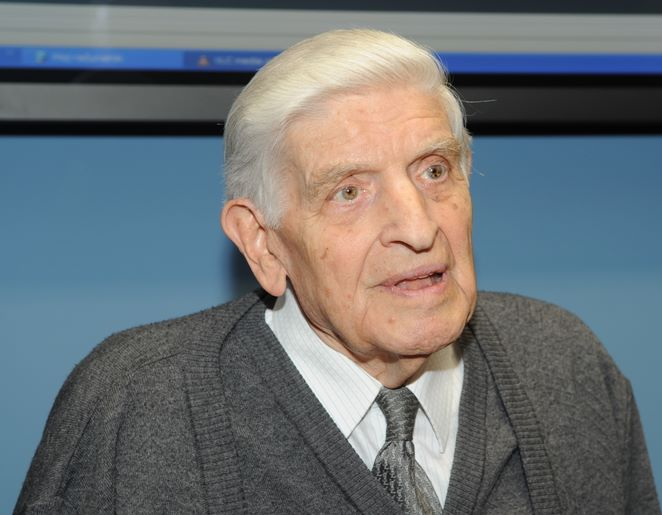
- Vratuša in 2009

President of the Executive Council of Slovenia
- In office 9 May 1978 – July 1980
- Preceded by: Andrej Marinc
- Succeeded by: Janez Zemljarič

Personal details
- Born: 21 February 1915 Alsócsalogány, Austria-Hungary (today Dolnji Slaveči, Slovenia)
- Died: 30 July 2017 (aged 102) Ljubljana, Slovenia
- Party: League of Communists of Yugoslavia
- Education: University of Ljubljana
- Civilian awards: Order of Merits for the People (I rank) Order of Brotherhood and Unity (II rank)

Military service
- Allegiance: Yugoslavia
- Branch/service: Yugoslav Partisans
- Years of service: 1941–1945
- Commands: Rab battalion
- Battles/wars: World War II in Yugoslavia
- Military awards: Order of the Partisan Star (II rank) Commemorative Medal of the Partisans of 1941

Anton Vratuša (born Vratussa Antal; (Note: This is a Hungarian name; "Vratussa" is the surname.) 21 February 1915 – 30 July 2017) was a Slovenian politician and diplomat who was Prime Minister of Slovenia from 1978 to 1980, and Yugoslavia's ambassador to the United Nations.

== Life ==
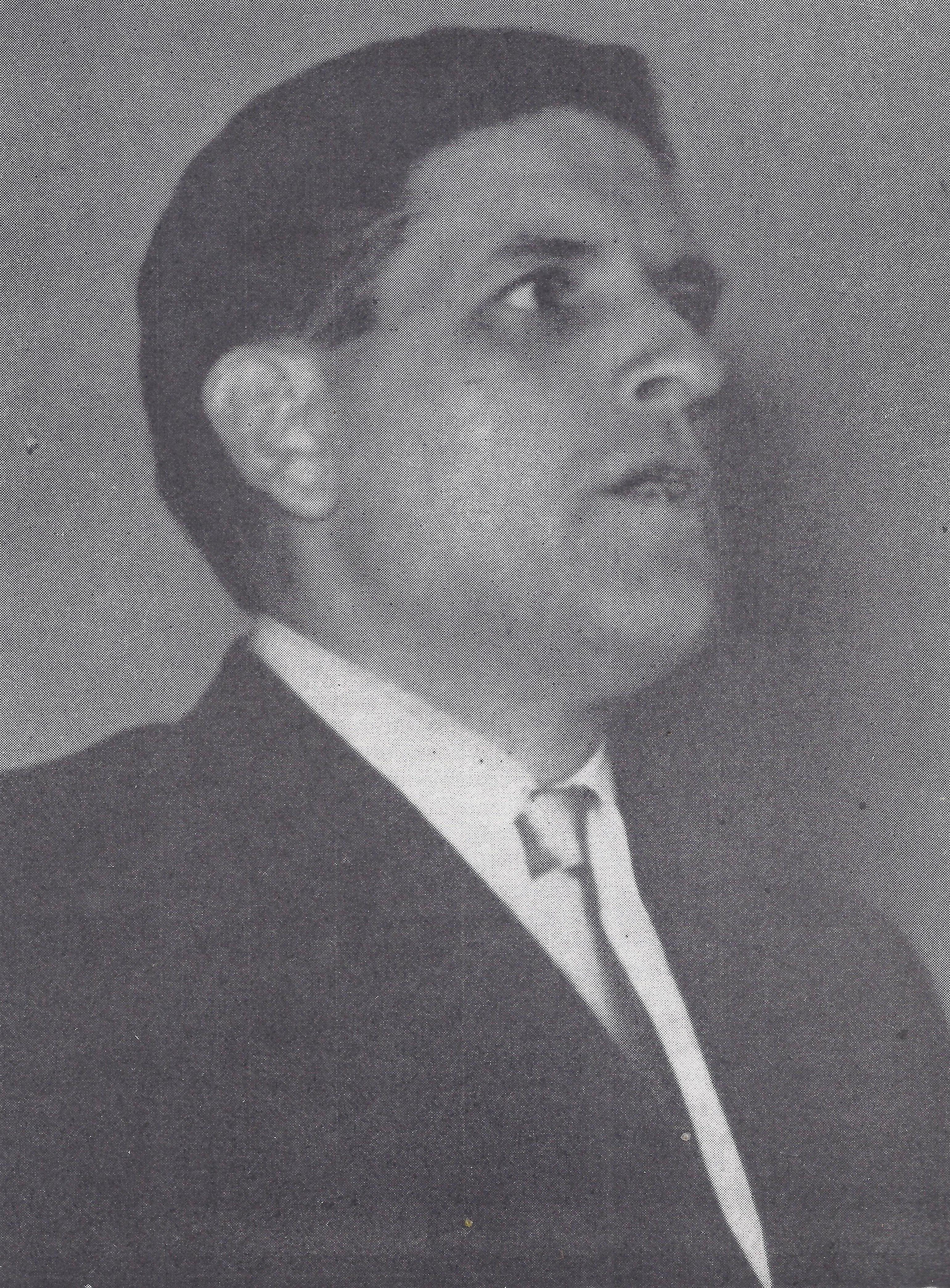
Vratuša in 1966

Vratuša was born in Alsócsalogány, Austria-Hungary, today Dolnji Slaveči, Slovenia. His parents were Antal Vratussa and Anna Bokán. He passed the exam for becoming a teacher of stenography. He defended his dissertation in Slavic studies at the Faculty of Arts in Ljubljana in 1941.

After the outbreak of the World War II in Yugoslavia, Vratuša joined the Yugoslav Partisans, but was interned in the Italian concentration camps at Gonars, Treviso, Padua, and Rab from February 1942 to September 1943. After the concentration camp at Rab was liberated by the Partisans, Vratuša was named deputy commander of their Rab battalion, made up of camp survivors. He was also the head of the Yugoslav Partisans' delegation at the National Liberation Committee, the Italian Partisans' underground political entity during the German occupation of Italy in the last years of World War II.

After the war, he pursued an academic and diplomatic career. He was chief of staff to Edvard Kardelj (1953–1965) and Yugoslavia's ambassador to the United Nations (1967–1969). From April 1978 to July 1980, he was the prime minister of the Yugoslav Socialist Republic of Slovenia. He was also a member of the Slovenian Academy of Sciences and Arts.

He helped found the International Center for Promotion of Enterprises, formerly known as the International Center for Public Enterprises in Developing Countries, and he later served as the honorary president of its council.

== Publications ==
Vratuša's published works include The Commune in Yugoslavia (1965) and Prospects of the Non-Aligned Movement (1981). From 1985 until 1988, he wrote various UN publications, especially in the fields of the law of the sea and politics in developing countries.

== Death ==
Vratuša died on 30 July 2017 at the age of 102.

Political offices
Preceded by Andrej Marinc	Chairmen of the Executive Council of Slovenia; 9 May 1978 – July 1980	Succeeded by Janez Zemljarič
