= Kruplivnik =

- Location in Slovenia
- Coordinates: 46°46′28.33″N 16°5′2.41″E
- Country: Slovenia
- Traditional region: Prekmurje
- Statistical region: Mura
- Municipality: Grad

Area
  - Total: 3.76 km^{2} (1.45 sq mi)
- Elevation: 272.5 m (894 ft)

Population (2020)
  - Total: 178
  - Density: 47.3/km^{2} (123/sq mi)

Kruplivnik (pronounced [kɾuˈpliːu̯nik]; in older sources also Koprivnik, Hungarian: Vaskorpád Prekmurje Slovene: Krplivnik) is a village in the Municipality of Grad in the Prekmurje region of northeastern Slovenia.
