= Vidonci =

- Location in Slovenia
- Coordinates: 46°49′1.65″N 16°7′36.46″E
- Country: Slovenia
- Traditional region: Prekmurje
- Statistical region: Mura
- Municipality: Grad

Area
  - Total: 7.21 km^{2} (2.78 sq mi)
- Elevation: 368.3 m (1,208 ft)

Population (2020)
  - Total: 301
  - Density: 41.7/km^{2} (108/sq mi)

Vidonci (pronounced [ˈʋiːdɔntsi]; Hungarian: Vidorlak) is a village in the Municipality of Grad in the Prekmurje region of northeastern Slovenia.

There is a small chapel in the settlement dedicated to the Sacred Heart of Jesus. It was built in 1888.
