= Belgrade interwar Christian architecture =

Aspect of religious architecture in Belgrade, Serbia

The period of Belgrade interwar Christian architecture is considered the golden age of church architecture, in which twenty Christian churches were built between 1918 and 1941 - which possibly exceeds the number of all Christian buildings built in this place throughout history. These sanctuaries, with their appearance, artistic beauty, power and distribution across the wider territory of the newly established capital of Kingdom of Yugoslavia, had the task not only of satisfying the spiritual needs of the growing number of believers - among them soldiers, clergy, officials, state authorities and workers - but also of contributing to a more attractive image of Belgrade in the first half of the 20th century.

With the bombing of Belgrade in the April War 1941, and then with the occupation and dismemberment of Yugoslavia – when Belgrade's church buildings were miraculously mostly undamaged – the golden age of Belgrade church architecture ended. However, it did not continue after liberation, because the new socialist government, for anti-religious political reasons, did not allow the construction of any shrines, let alone monumental ones.

The central topic of this article is the interwar period. In order to get a clearer image that will outline this space - its "Sitz im Leben" - we must also look back at history, as well as at the later period up to the present day, which was in many ways completely different from our time - so that we can judge and understand it more correctly.

== History ==
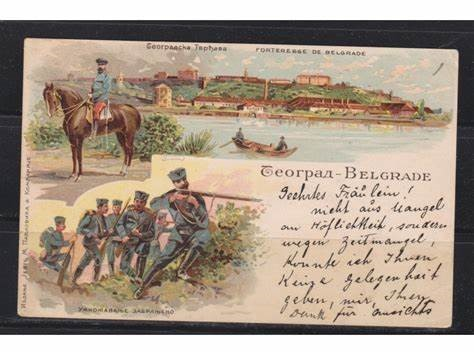
A postcard from 1899 shows Kalemegdan.

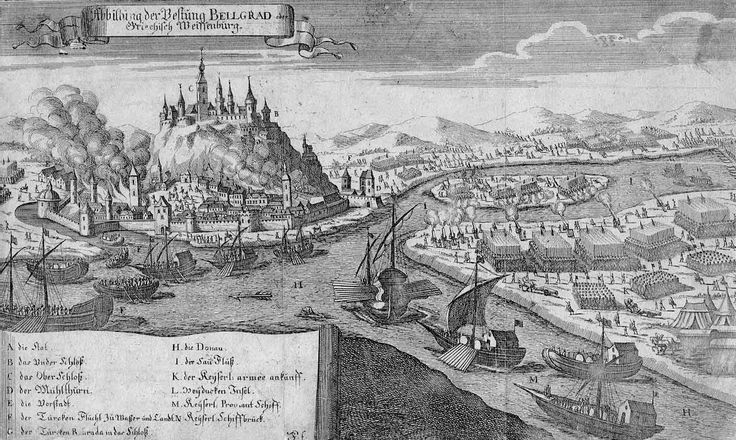
Belgrade has been besieged and conquered many times throughout history.

During the Principality and Kingdom of Serbia, was in Belgrade the Orthodox "Cathedral of the Archangel Michael" and two churches on Kalemegdan.

=== Roman, Middle Ages and Ottoman Period ===
From the beginnings of Christianity in the era of the Roman Empire, the arrival of the Slavs and their Christianization, the Belgrade area played the role of an important Christian center throughout centuries of history.

During the five-century Turkish rule Belgrade also transformed into the center of the Belgrade Pashalik with a completely Islamic external appearance.

It is not known how many Christian churches there were during the Roman period; after the arrival of the Turks, Christians built churches for their believers only in peaceful times.

=== Period of the Principality and Kingdom of Serbia ===
After victories of Eugene of Savoy, Austria became one of the most powerful European powers and approached the borders of the Belgrade Pashalik, as the people called it, but which was still entirely under the rule of the »Osmani«. This also gave courage to the Christians to gradually demand its rights.

From the end of the 19th century, Belgrade expanded and developed until the World War I, which also required the construction of new churches. Despite its modest material and technical capabilities, the Kingdom of Serbia in its capital "increasingly adapted its architecture to the stylistic transformation and the irresistible Europeanization of its architectural fund."

After the First Serbian Uprising and gaining increasing independence from the Ottomans, first the vassal Principality and then the independent Kingdom of Serbia began to build Christian Orthodox churches throughout the country and also in Belgrade.

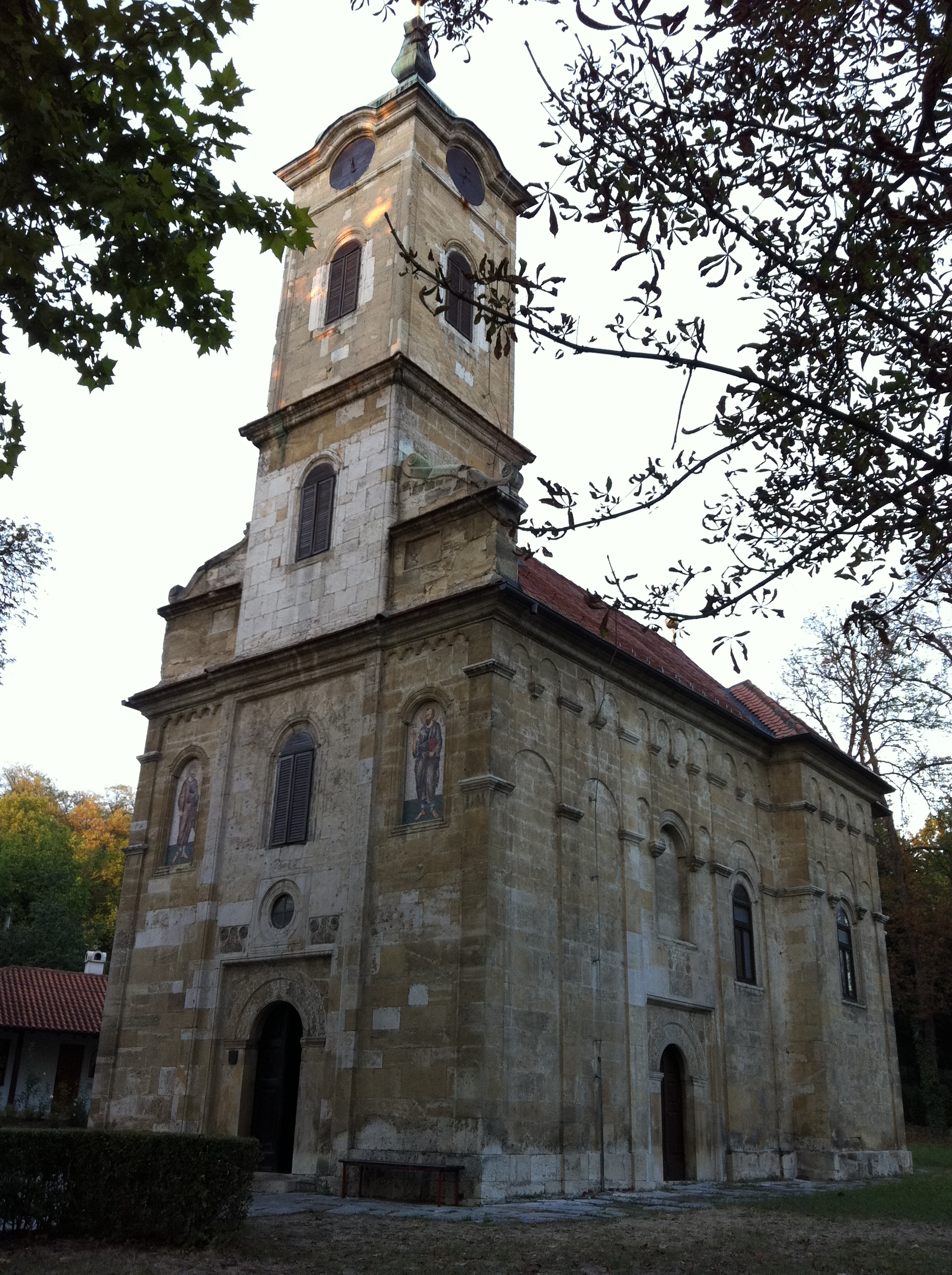
Topčider Church of the Holy Apostles Peter and Paul

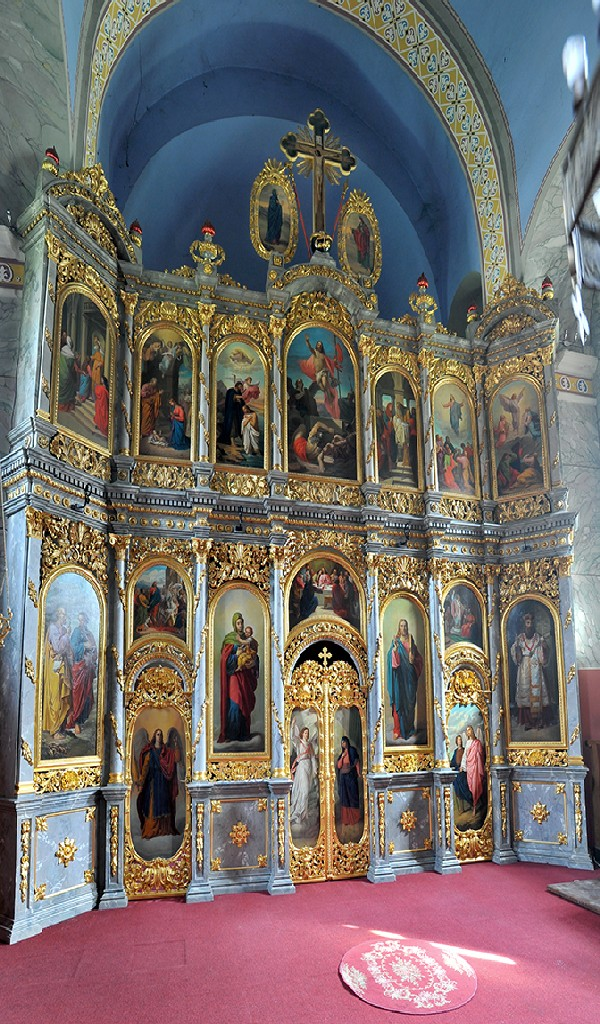
Church of the Holy Apostles Peter and Paul in Topčider park, iconostasis

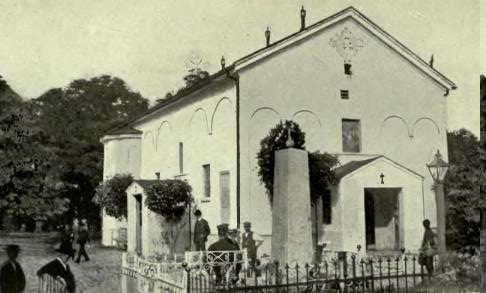
The old church of St. Mark in Tašmajdan

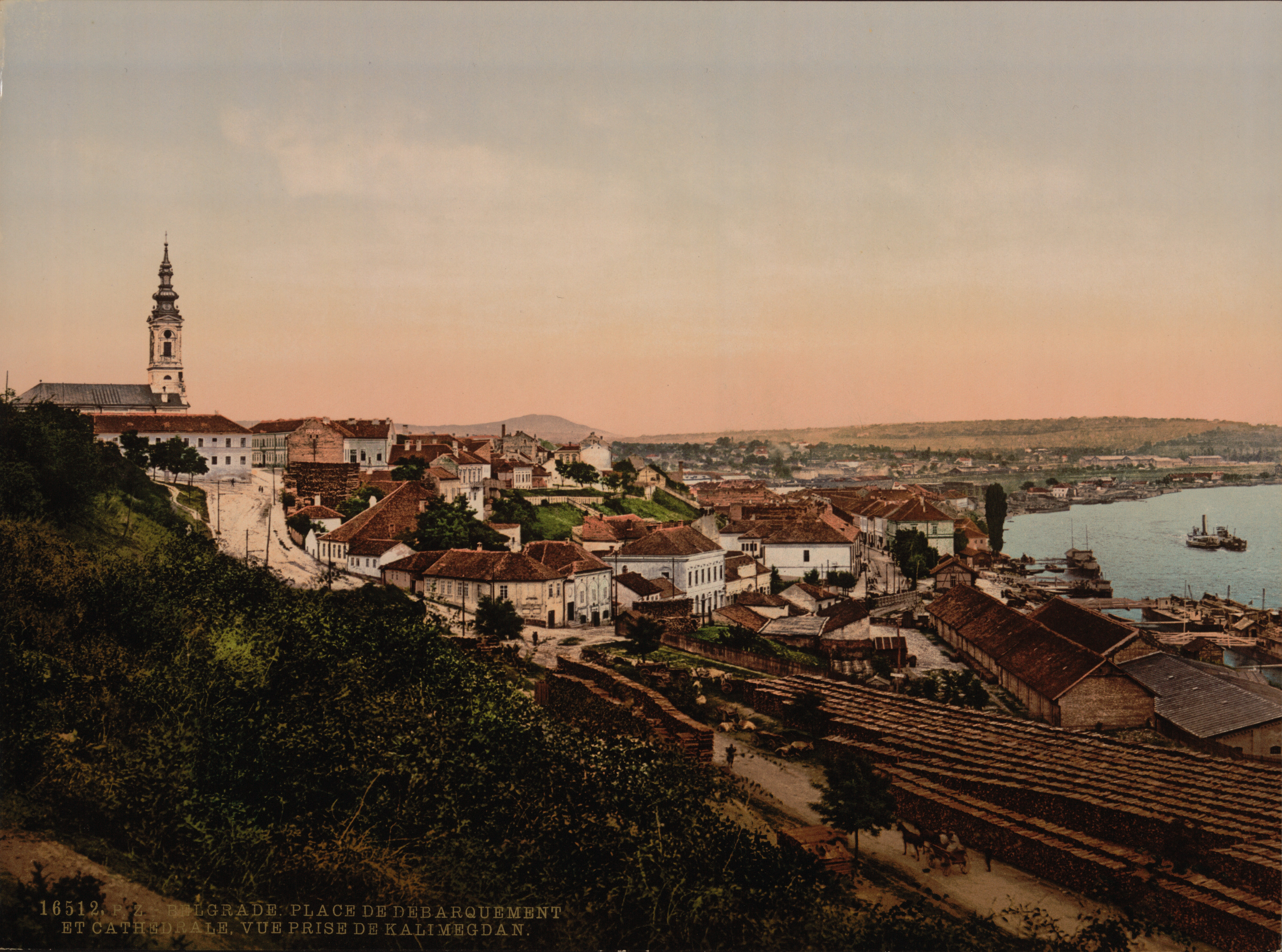
View on the Cathedral of St. Archangel Michael, warehouse and port on the Sava

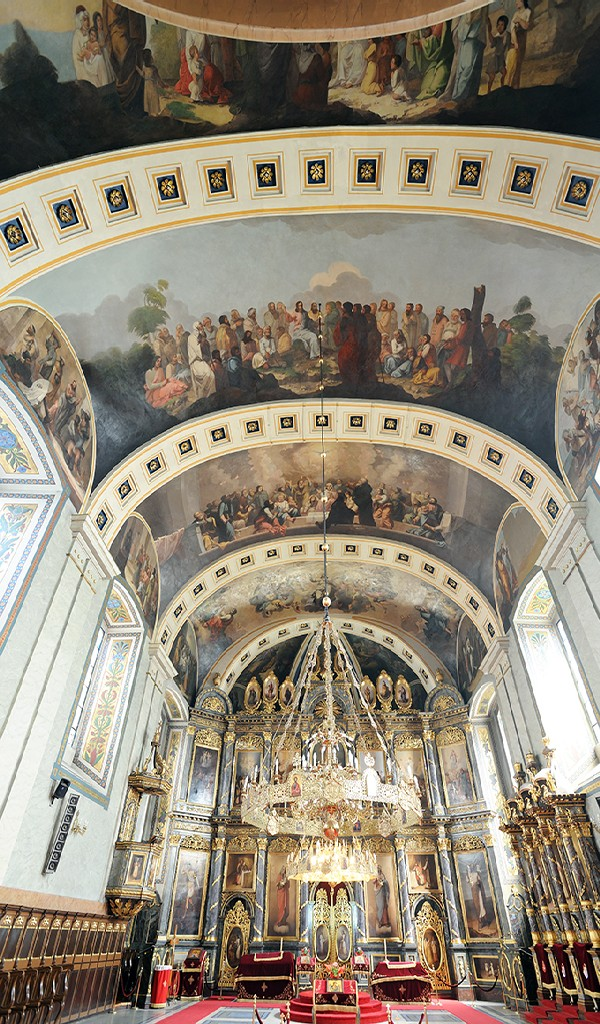
St. Michael's Cathedral – iconostas and painted ceiling
1. Church of the Holy Apostles Peter and Paul, Topčider (1832–1834).
2. Old Church of St. Mark on Tašmajdan (1835) and
3. St. Michael's Cathedral (1837–1840).

=== Period of Old Yugoslavia ===
After the end of World War I, a period of religious construction flourished, especially for the needs of the Serbian Orthodox Church, the initiators of which were:

1. The king encouraged the unification of the Orthodox Serbian regions divided into six legal units into a single and restored patriarchate (1920); a similar unification of the various legal systems also occurred for Catholics from the former Austro-Hungary and Montenegro.
2. Establishment of the Ministry of Religion (Ministarstvo vera).
3. Strengthened activity of the Building Department at the Ministry of Architecture.
4. Support of the Russian exiled builders who, after the October Revolution managed to save their lives from the communists and find their refuge and a new home in Belgrade. Their design solutions with strong originality and their own characteristics not only shaped Orthodox Belgrade between the wars, but also left their mark on most sacred buildings of all denominations.

==== Orthodox churches ====
Between 1918 and 1941, numerous independent religious buildings with porticos (porta, courtyard) and many chapels were built in Belgrade as part of existing or newly built buildings. The state authorities and the Belgrade city administration were generally prepared to meet the needs of religious communities and their aspirations to preserve the cultural identity and multi-religious diversity of the population and clergy. Therefore, in Belgrade, in addition to Orthodox church buildings, they had to start building also for Catholic, other Christian and non-Christian believers, who were moving to the new capital in large numbers, especially from the regions of the former Austro-Hungarian Empire.

During this period, sacral buildings for Orthodox Christians were being built in the areas of Vračar, Palilula, Čukarica, Senjak, Bulbuder, Stari Grad, Dorčol and other quarters.

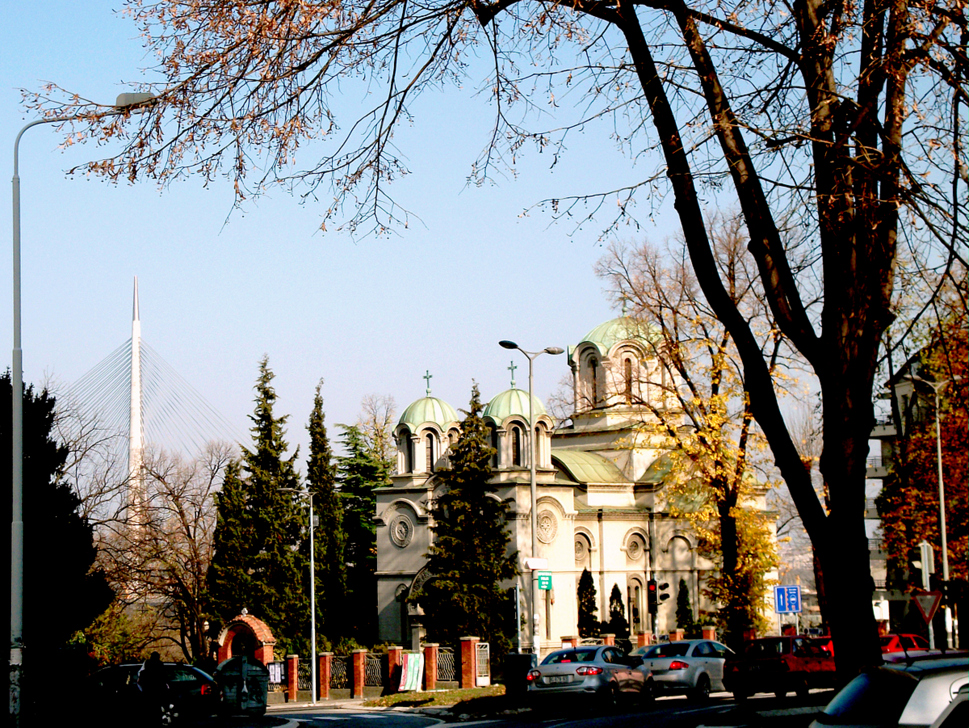
Church of St. George in Banovo Brdo (Čukarica)

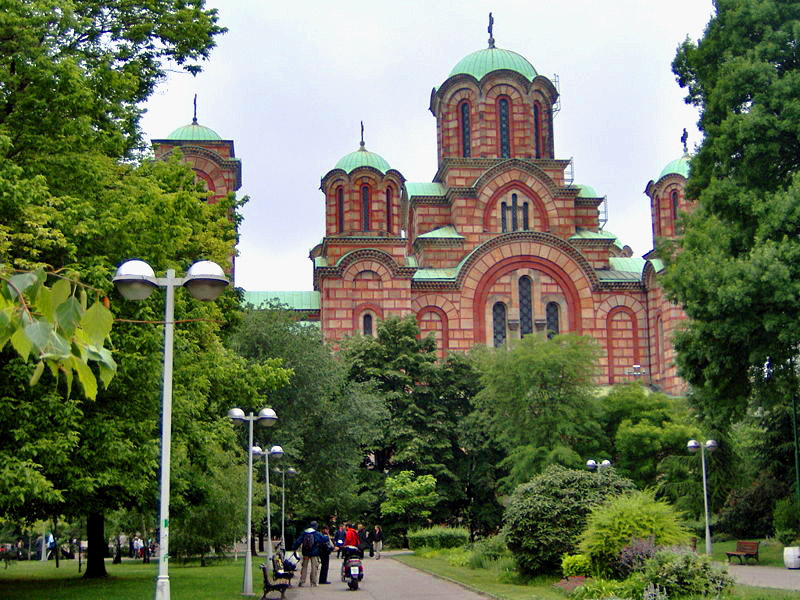
New St. Mark's Church in Tašmajdan

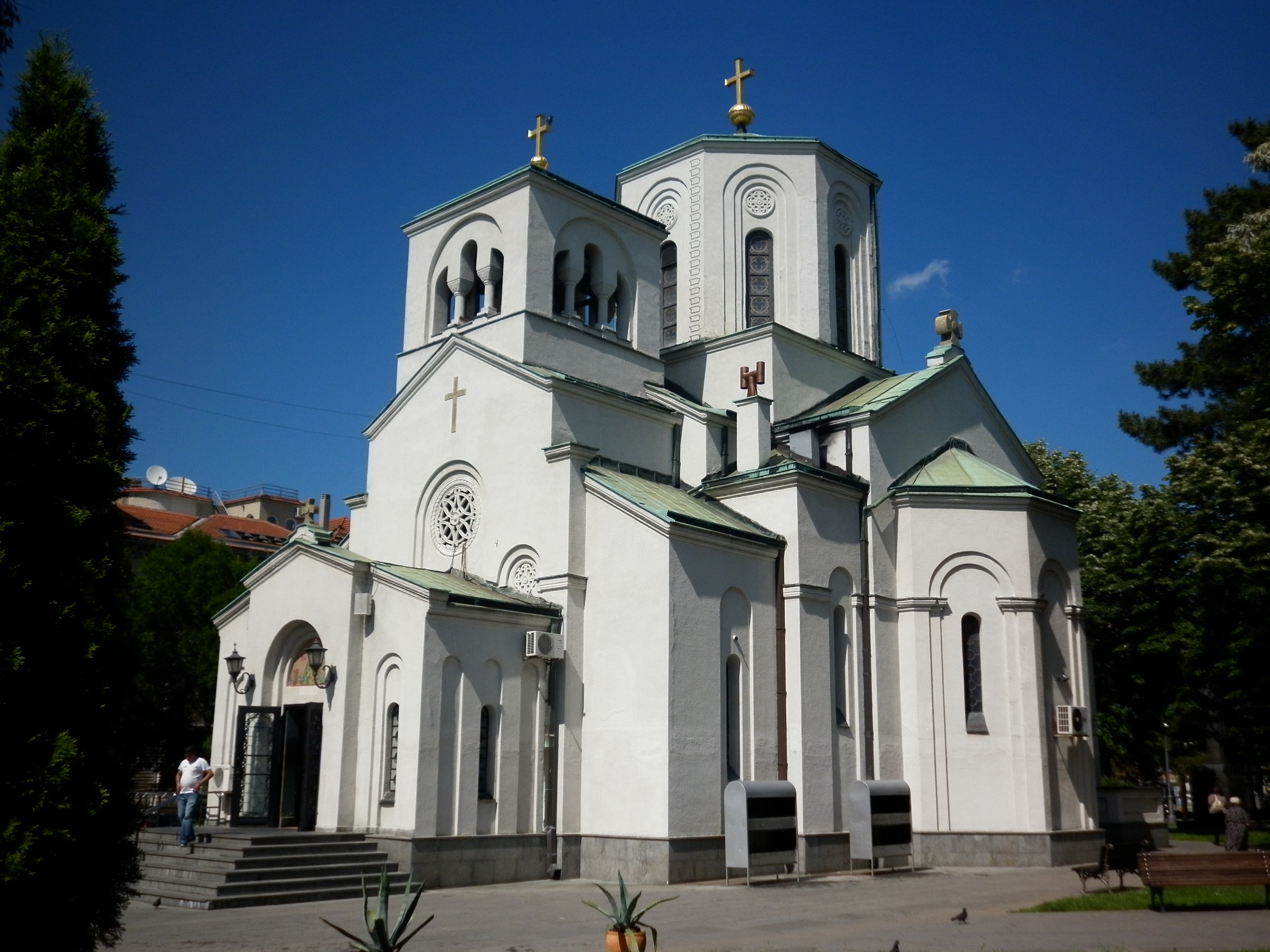
The Old (=Little) church of Saint Sava in Vračar

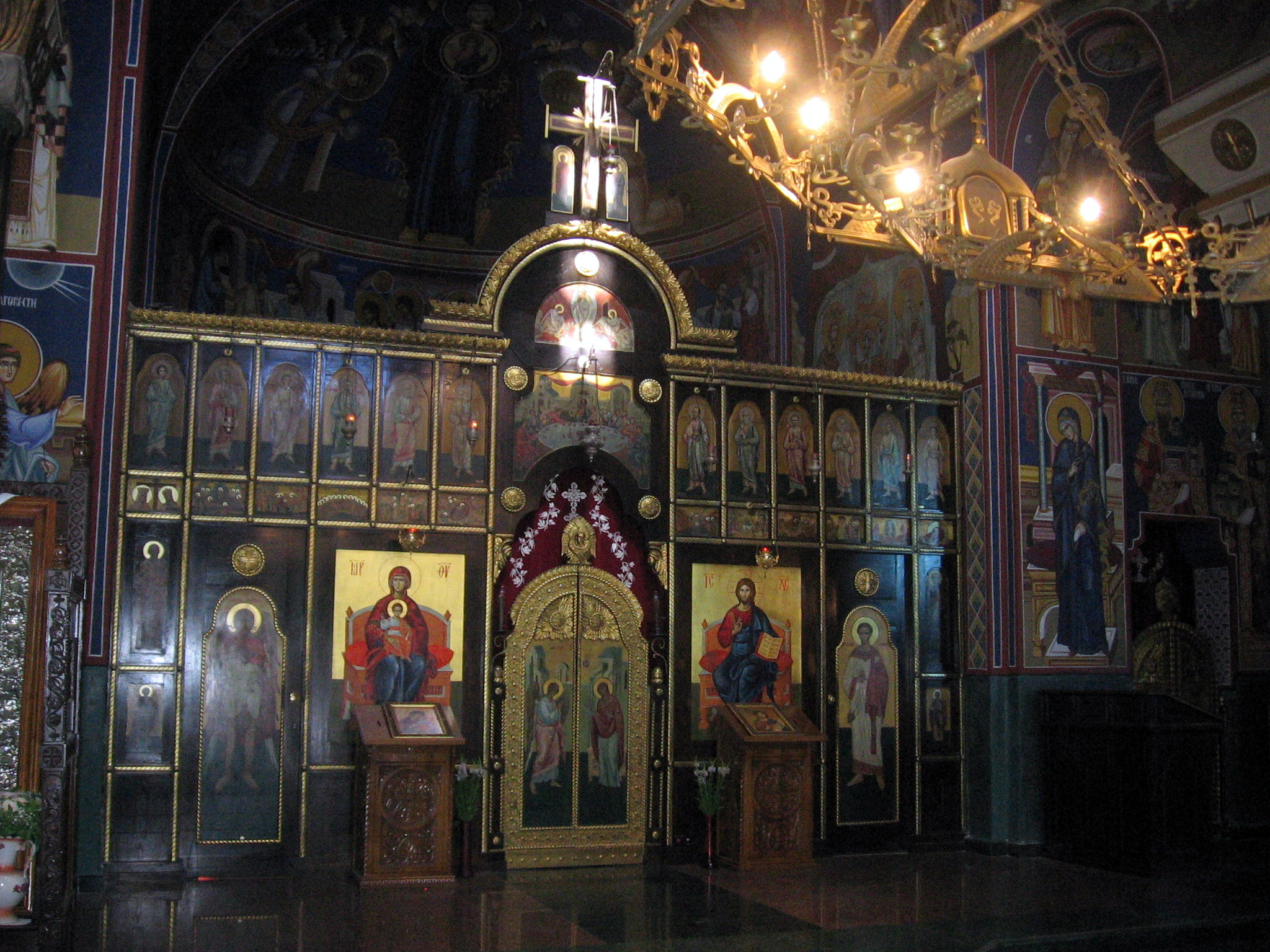
The interior of the Old Saint Sava church

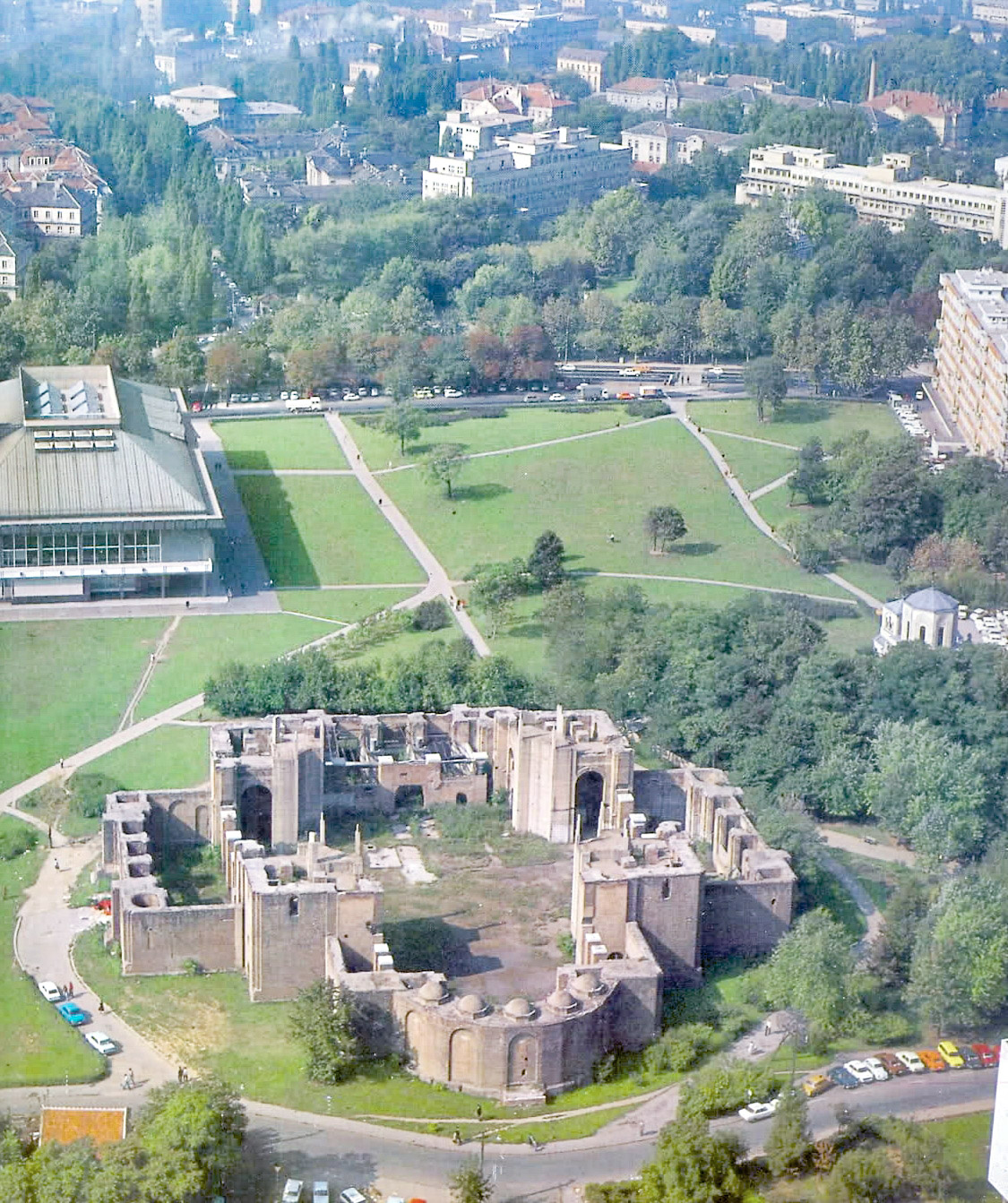
New church of Sveti Sava until World War II

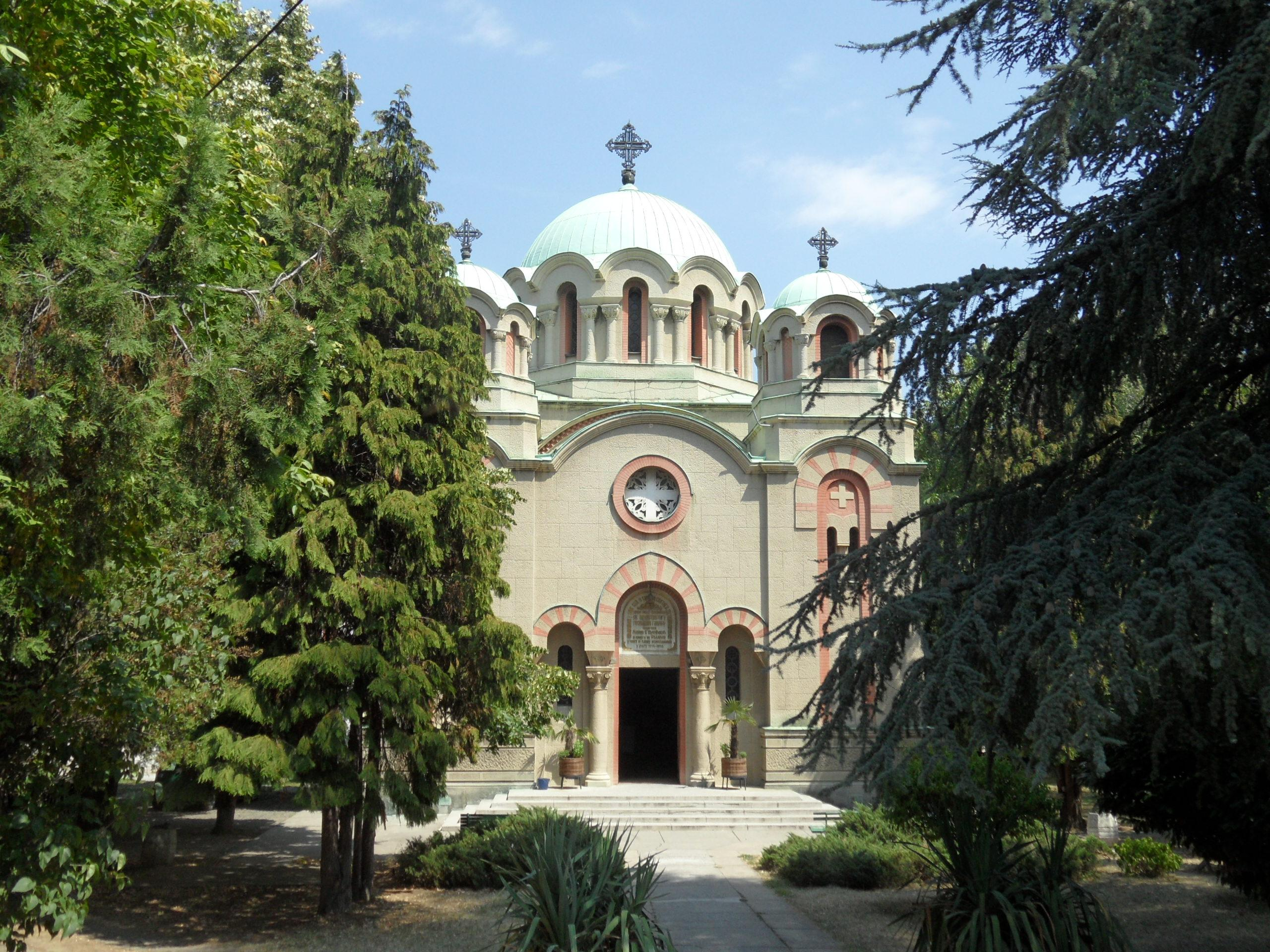
Saint Archangel Gabriel’s Church on Savski venac

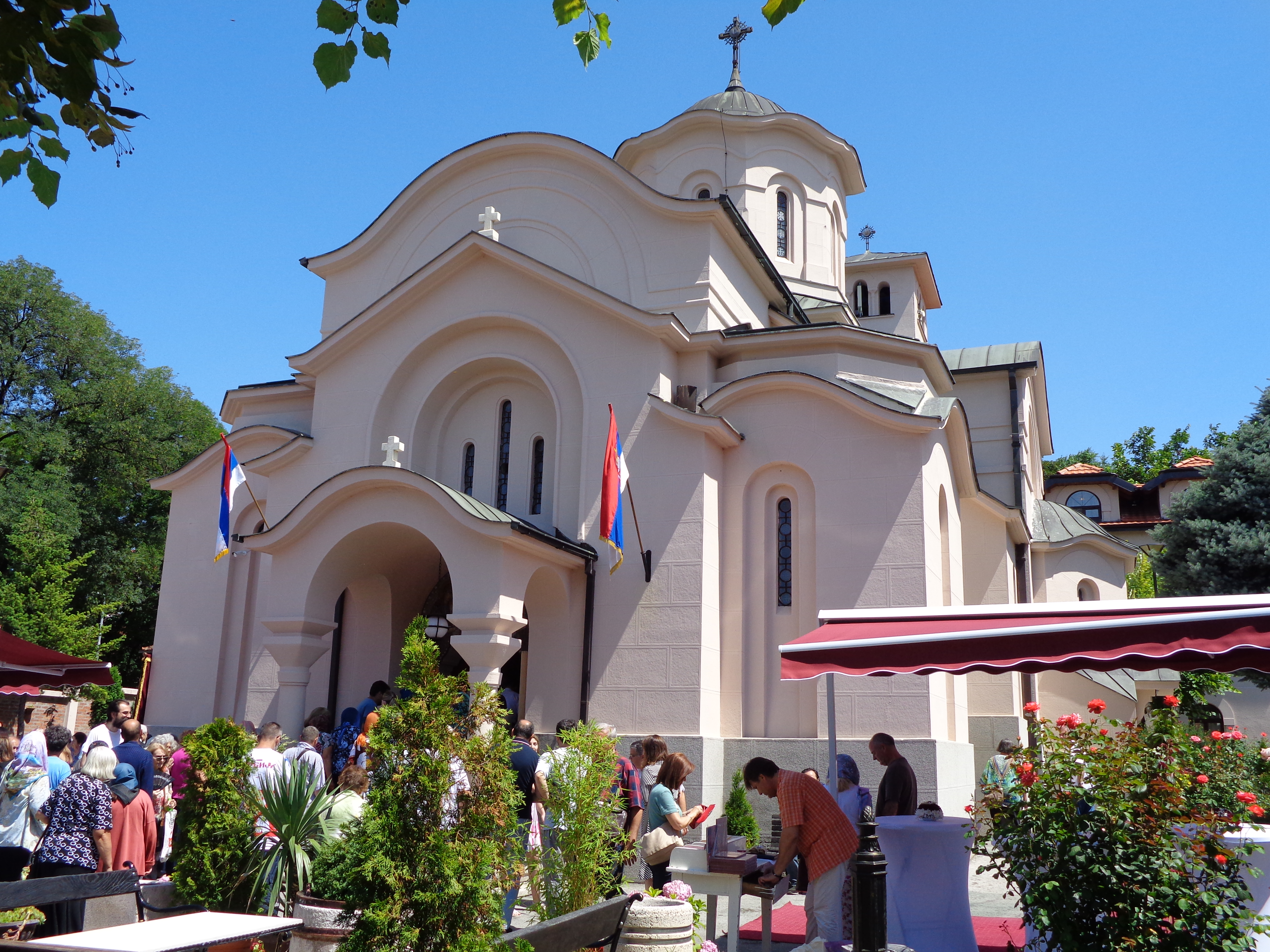
Church „Lazarica“ on Zvezdara

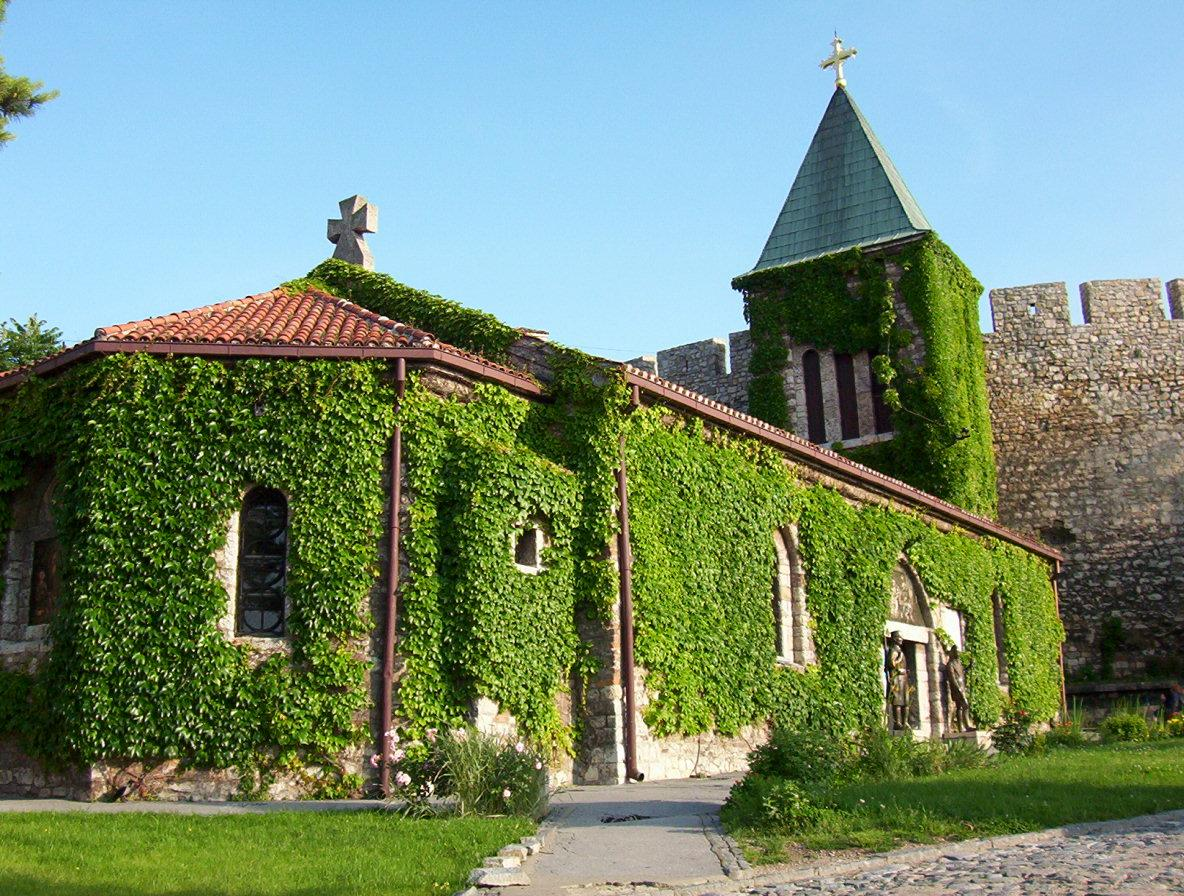
Ružica Church on Kalemegdan

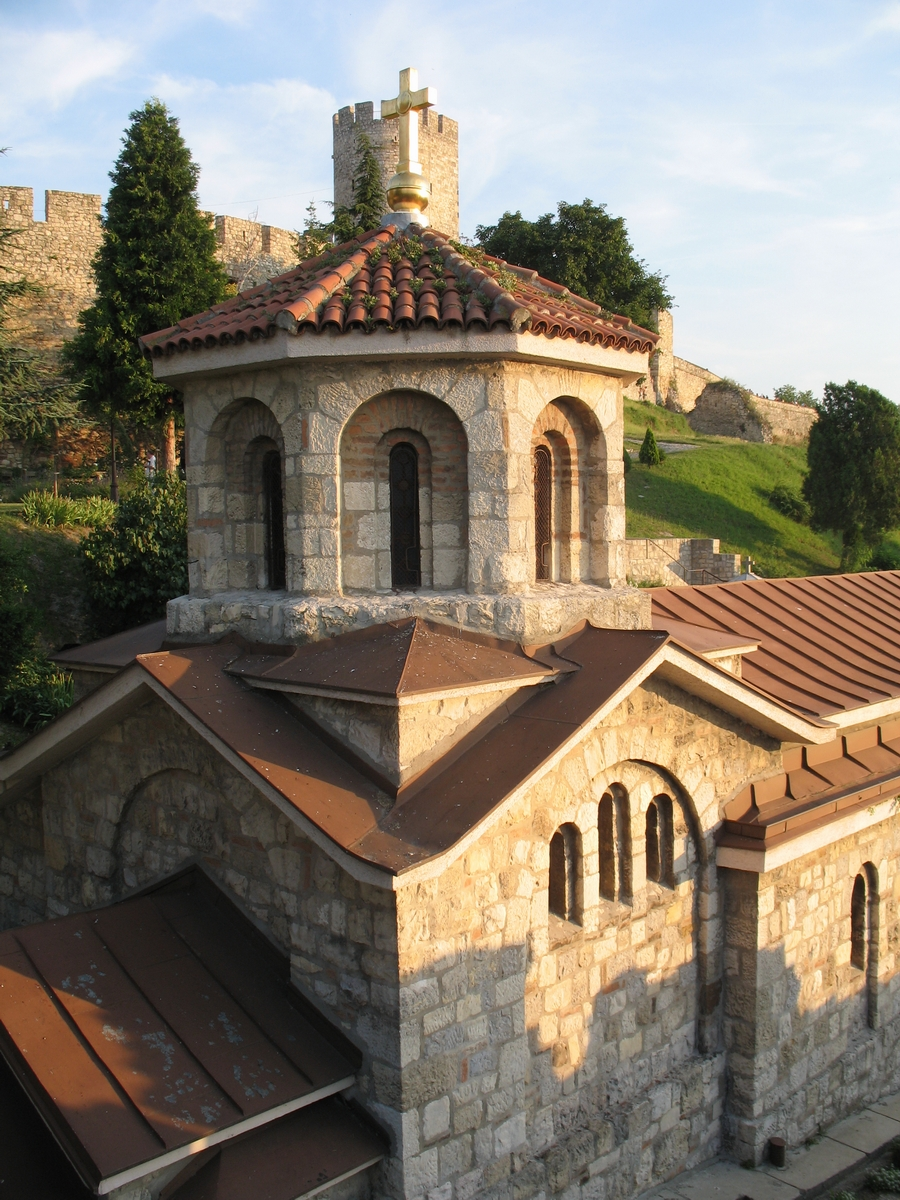
Church of Saint Petka on Kalemegdan

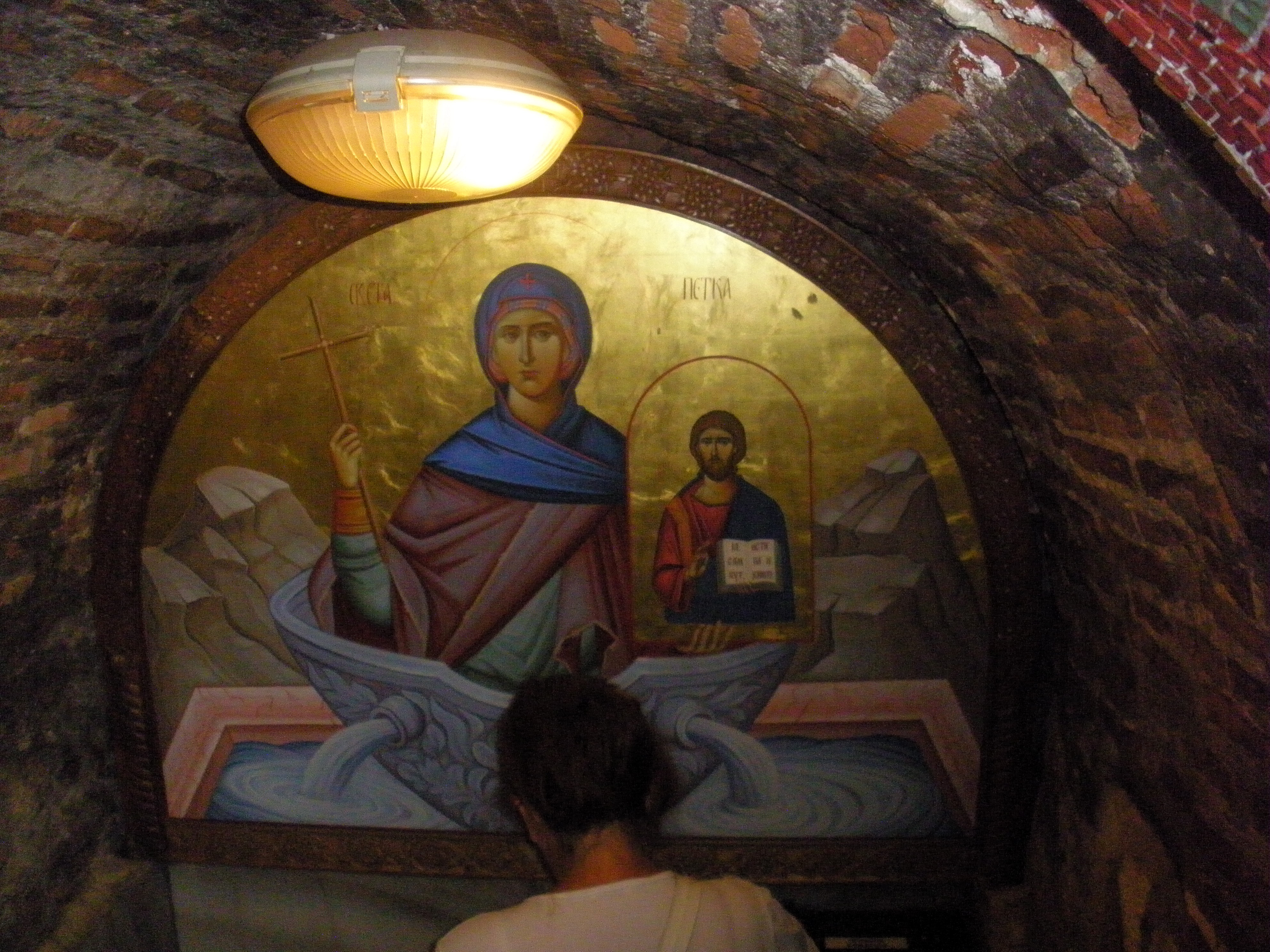
Mosaic of Saint Petka over sacred spring in her church

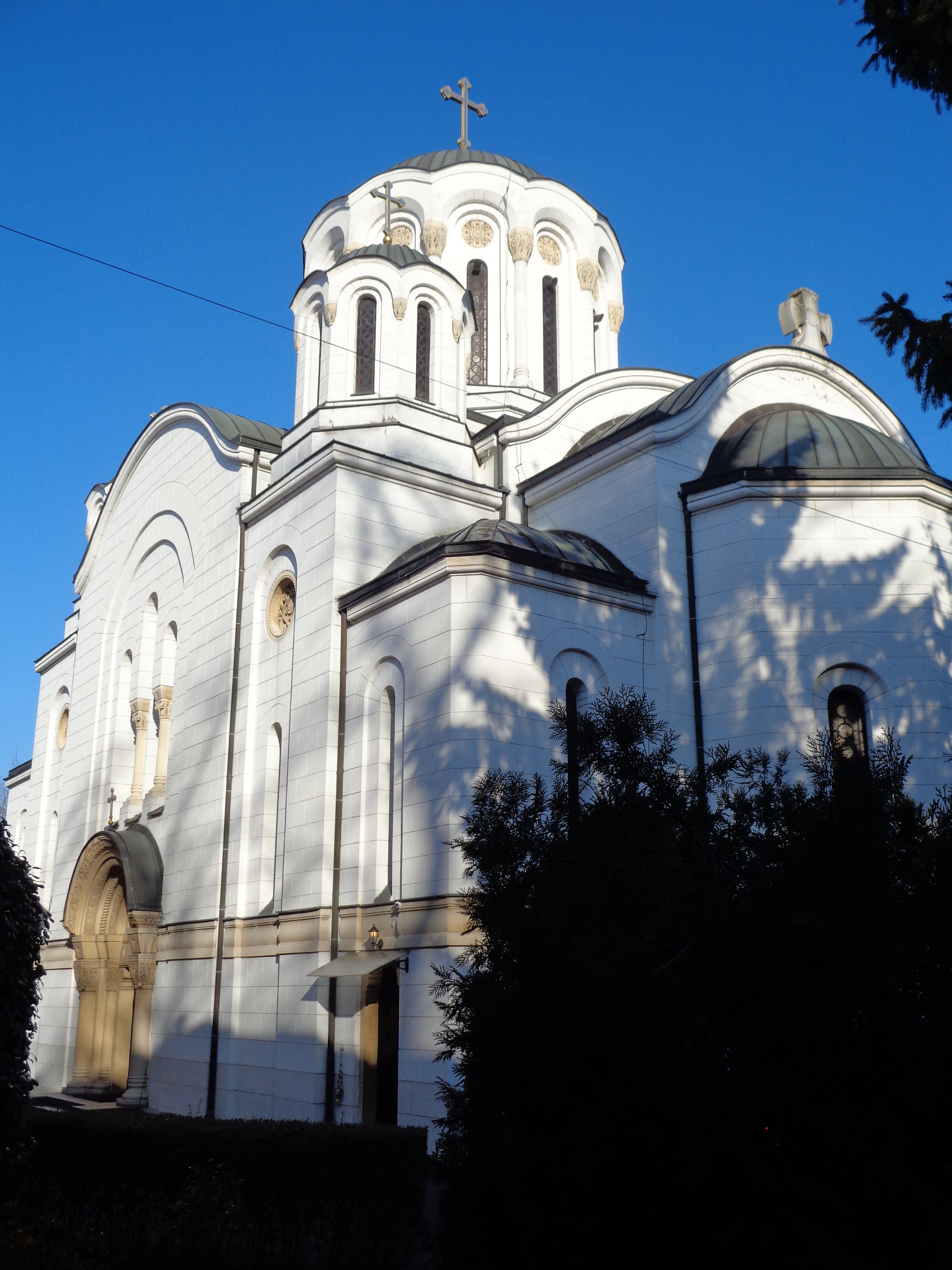
Vavedenje Monastery in Senjak

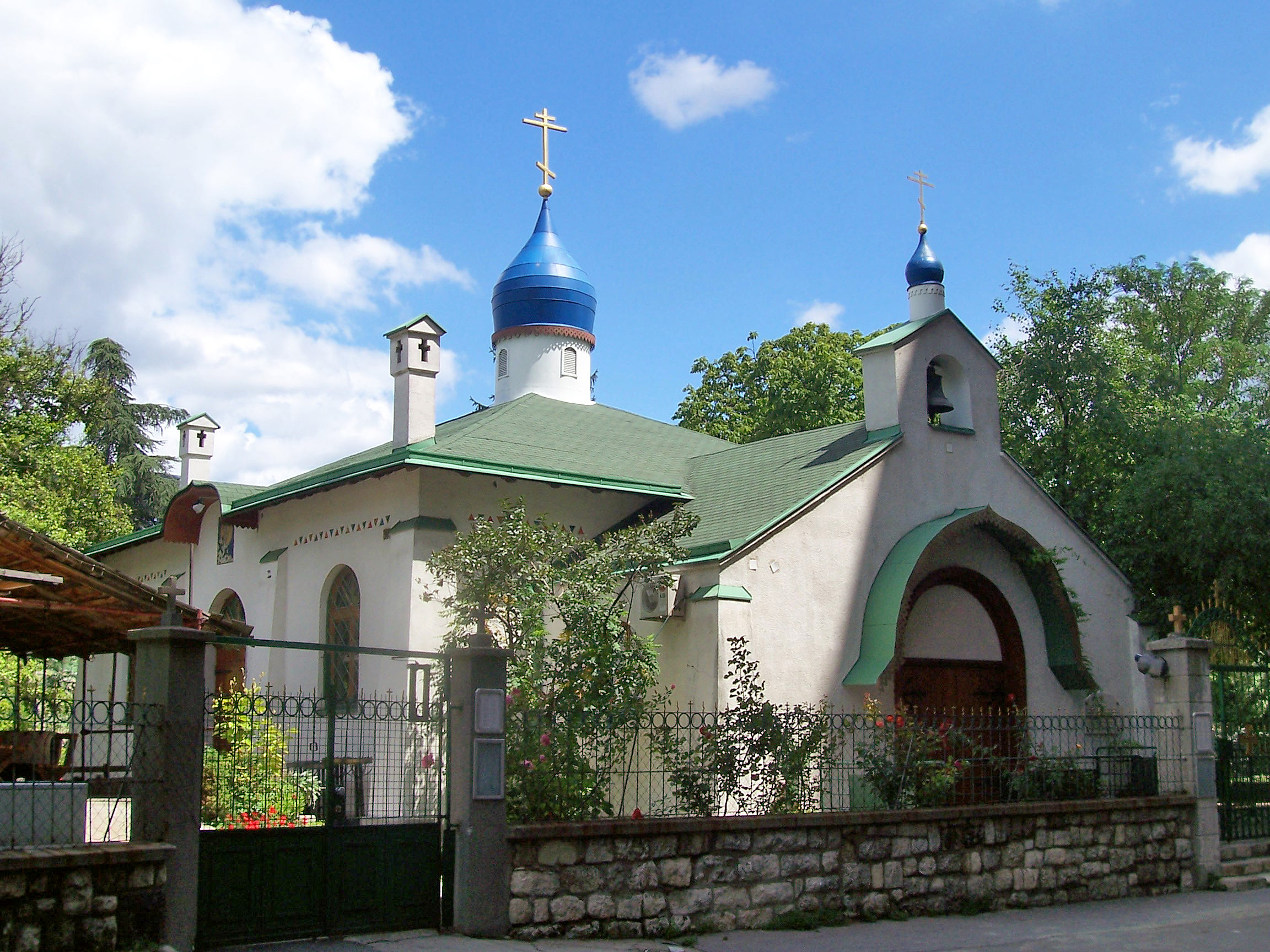
"Russian Church" of the Holy Trinity in Tašmajdan
