= Rab battalion =

Partisan unit of the People's Liberation Army of Yugoslavia

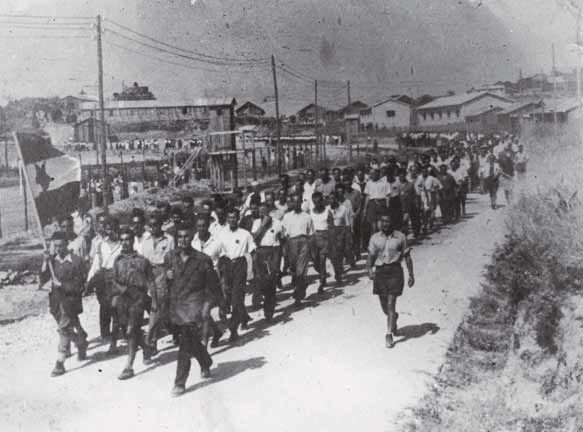
Jewish Rab Battalion 1943.

The Rab Battalion was a unit of the Yugoslav partisans during the Second World War. It was formed by and from Jewish survivors of Rab concentration camp upon their liberation in September 1943.

Rab concentration camp was one of the Italian concentration and internment camps during World War II. It opened in July 1942 near the village of Kampor, on the Adriatic island of Rab (Italian: Arbe). The camp was liberated after the armistice with Italy in September 1943, whereupon about 245 Jewish survivors formed the Partisans' Rab battalion intending to fight Nazi German forces occupying Yugoslavia.

With the help of local partisans, who sent a ship to the island, the battalion was transferred to the Croatian mainland on September 17, 1943. The battalion originally comprised some 245 Jews aged 15–30 with little or no military training, and one medical unit with 35 women who offered to serve as nurses. With those who joined later, there were 691 members of the Jewish battalion. In addition to the fighters, about 3,000 Jews from the Rab camp — almost all of them women, elderly and children — were shipped from the island to the mainland by the Partisans and dispersed into territories held by them. The recorded total of 204 Jews who remained behind in the Rab camp, most of them very old or sick, were transported to Auschwitz when the Germans came to the island. None survived.

After walking north for 16 days over mountains and through forest, the Jewish fighters joined the 7th Partisan Division. In addition to the battalion, 648 former inmates of the concentration camp joined the Partisan movement, meaning that from the Rab camp 1,339 former inmates joined the People's Liberation War. The battalion took part in heavy fighting against Germany's and the Independent State of Croatia's forces in the Croatian regions of Banovina, Kordun and Lika, and due to severe losses suffered the battalion had to be disbanded and its members absorbed by other Partisan units.
