= Municipality of Grad =

Municipality of Slovenia

Municipality of Grad Občina Grad
- Municipality
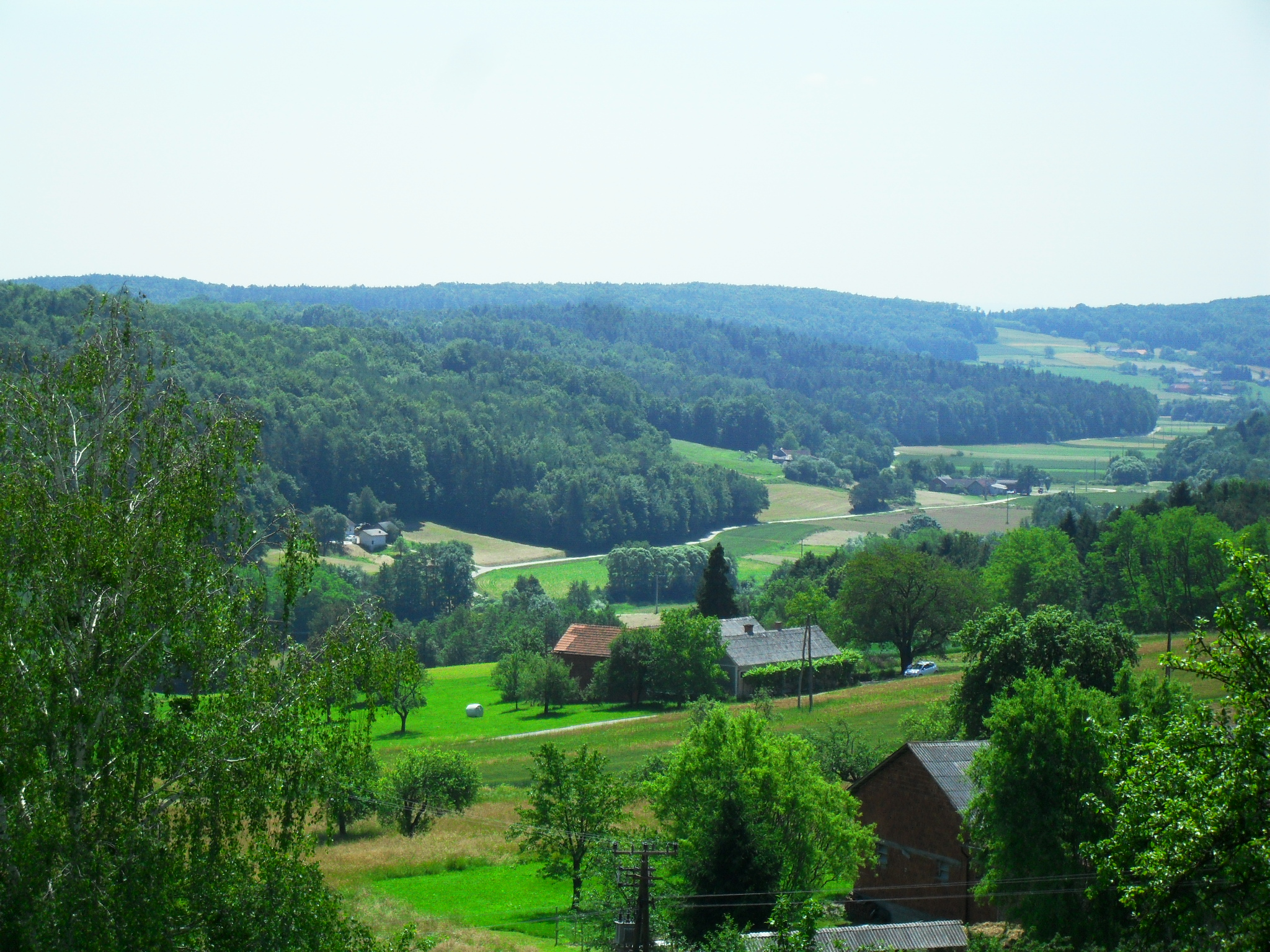

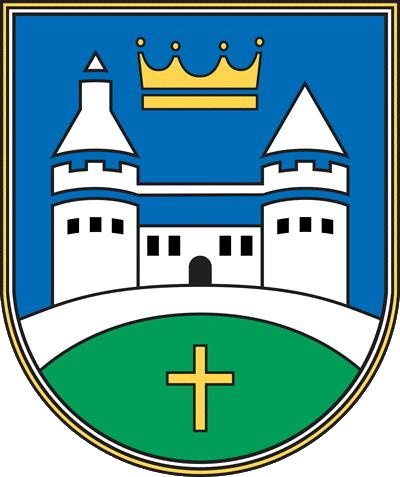
- Coat of arms

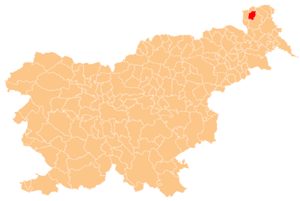
- Location of the Municipality of Grad in Slovenia
- Coordinates: 46°48′03″N 16°05′30″E
- Country: Slovenia

Government
  - Mayor: Cvetka Ficko (Independent)

Area
  - Total: 37.4 km^{2} (14.4 sq mi)

Population (2002)
  - Total: 2,302
  - Density: 61.6/km^{2} (159/sq mi)
- Time zone: UTC+01 (CET)
  - Summer (DST): UTC+02 (CEST)
- Website: www.obcina-grad.si

The Municipality of Grad (pronounced [ˈɡɾaːt]; Slovene: Občina Grad) is a municipality in Slovenia. The seat of the municipality is the village of Grad.

== Settlements ==
In addition to the municipal seat of Grad, the municipality also includes the following settlements:

- Dolnji Slaveči
- Kovačevci
- Kruplivnik
- Motovilci
- Radovci
- Vidonci
