= Municipality of Kuzma =

Municipality of Slovenia

Municipality of Kuzma Občina Kuzma
- Municipality
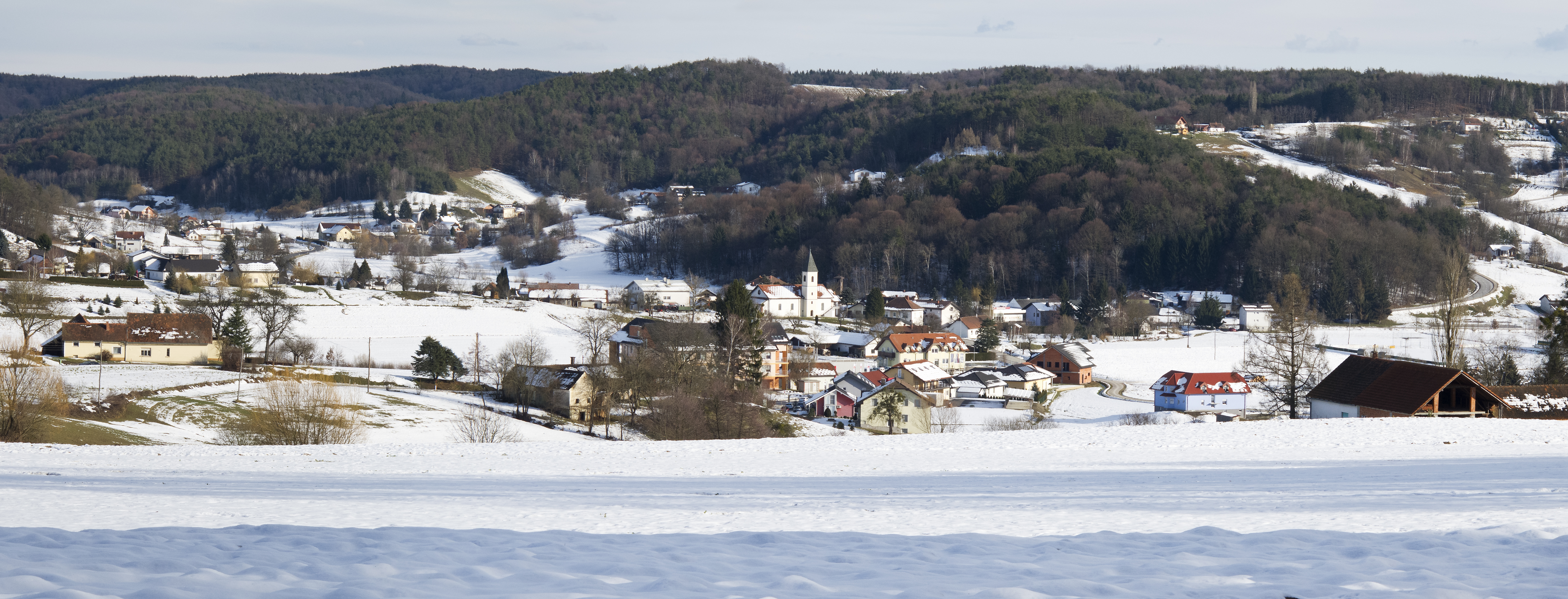

- Location of the Municipality of Kuzma in Slovenia
- Coordinates: 46°50′N 16°05′E
- Country: Slovenia

Government
  - Mayor: Jožef Škalič (Independent)

Area
  - Total: 22.9 km^{2} (8.8 sq mi)

Population (2002)
  - Total: 1,683
  - Density: 73.5/km^{2} (190/sq mi)
- Time zone: UTC+01 (CET)
  - Summer (DST): UTC+02 (CEST)
- Website: www.obcina-kuzma.si

The Municipality of Kuzma (pronounced [ˈkuːzma]; Slovene: Občina Kuzma) is a municipality in northeastern Slovenia. It gets its name from the largest settlement and administrative seat of the municipality, Kuzma. The current mayor is Jožef Škalič. It borders Austria.

== Settlements ==
In addition to the municipal seat of Kuzma, the municipality also includes the following settlements:

- Dolič
- Gornji Slaveči
- Matjaševci
- Trdkova
