= Milivoje Živanović =

Serbian actor

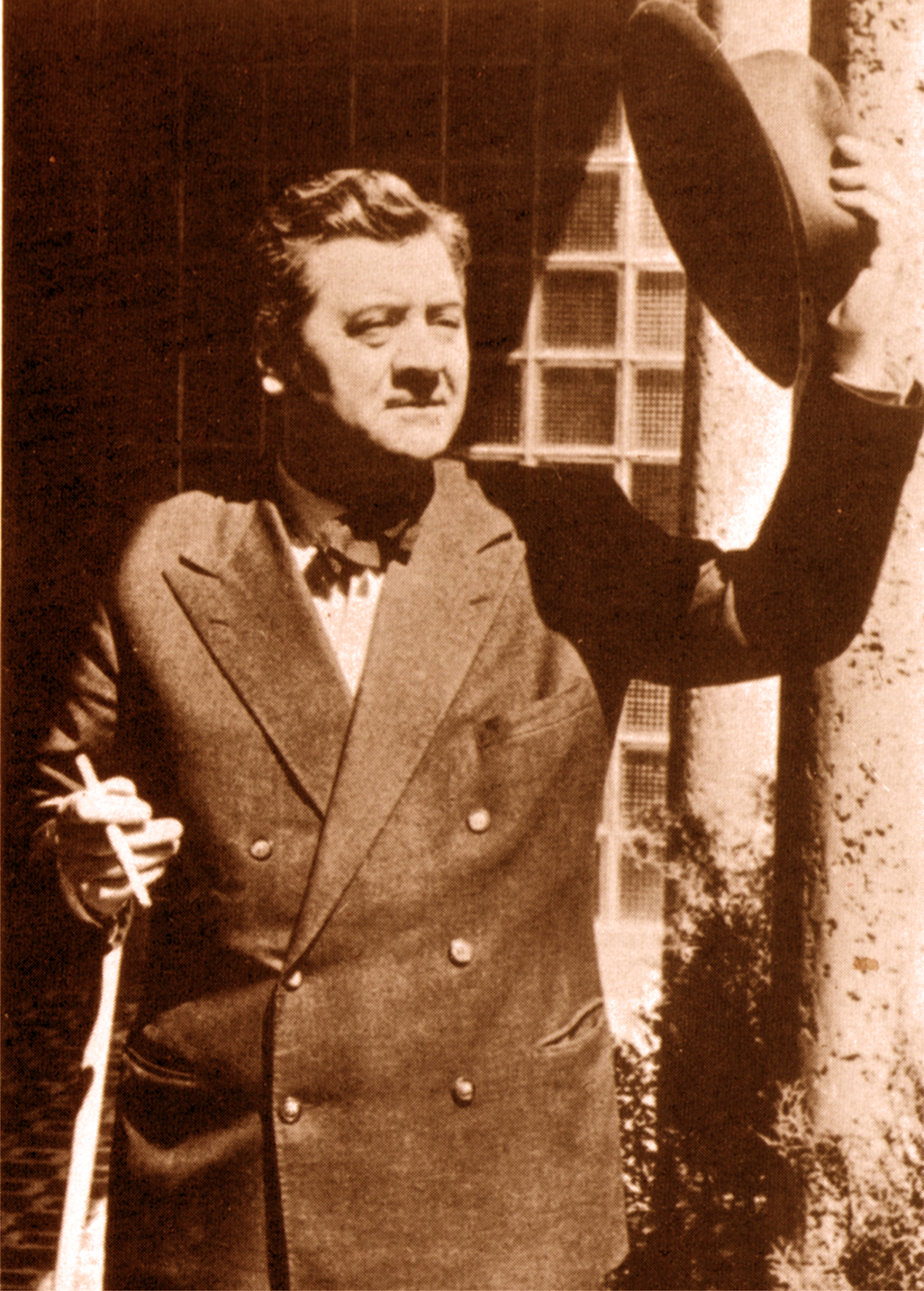
- Born: Milivoje Živanović; 2 April 1900; Požarevac, Kingdom of Serbia
- Died: 15 November 1976 (aged 76); Belgrade, SR Serbia, SFR Yugoslavia

Milivoje Živanović (Serbian Cyrillic: Миливоје Живановић; 2 April 1900 – 15 November 1976) was a renowned Serbian film and stage actor.
