= Ravna Reka =

Ravna Reka may refer to the following places in Serbia:

- Ravna Reka (Despotovac)
- Ravna Reka (Vladičin Han)
- Ravna reka (river)
