= Radovci, Grad =

Radovci
- Location in Slovenia
- Coordinates: 46°46′47.27″N 16°6′27.18″E
- Country: Slovenia
- Traditional region: Prekmurje
- Statistical region: Mura
- Municipality: Grad

Area
  - Total: 4.86 km^{2} (1.88 sq mi)
- Elevation: 271.2 m (890 ft)

Population (2020)
  - Total: 188
  - Density: 38.7/km^{2} (100/sq mi)

Radovci (pronounced [ˈɾaːdɔu̯tsi]; Hungarian: Radófa) is a village in the Municipality of Grad in the Prekmurje region of northeastern Slovenia.
