= Kuzma, Kuzma =

Kuzma
- Town and Municipality
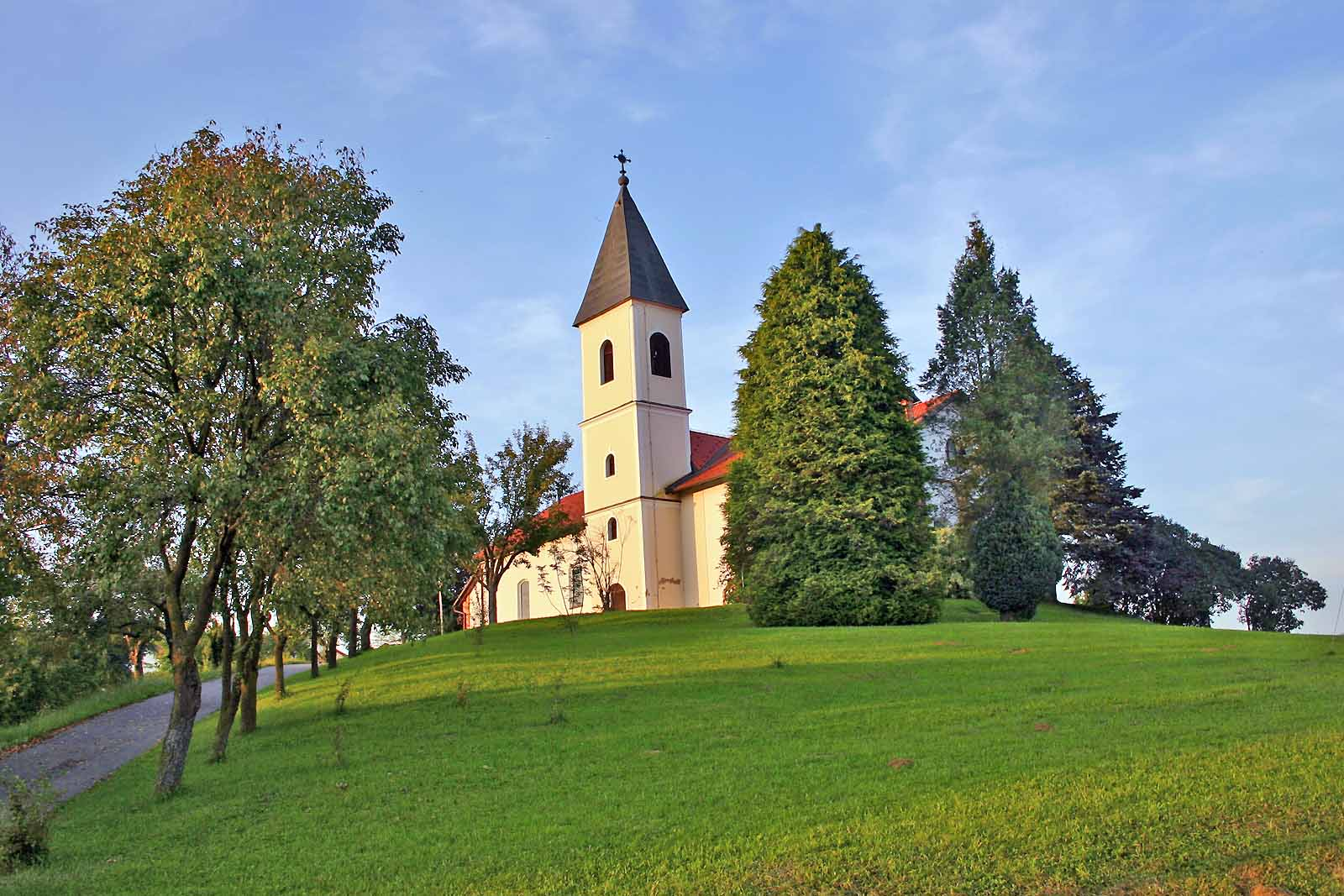
- Sts. Cosmas and Damian Parish Church

- Location of the town of Kuzma in Slovenia
- Coordinates: 46°50′N 16°05′E
- Country: Slovenia

Government
  - Mayor: Jožef Škalič

Area
  - Total: 3.6 km^{2} (1.4 sq mi)

Population (2012)
  - Total: 429
  - Density: 118/km^{2} (310/sq mi)
- Time zone: UTC+01 (CET)
  - Summer (DST): UTC+02 (CEST)

Kuzma (pronounced [ˈkuːzma]) is a settlement in the Municipality of Kuzma in the Prekmurje region in northeastern Slovenia, on the borders with Austria and Hungary.

== Name ==
Kuzma was attested in written sources in 1387 as Zalocha and Zaloucha, and as Kuzma in 1763–87. The name Kuzma is derived from the Slovene saint's name Kozma 'Cosmas'. Locally, the settlement is known as Kuzdobljan (in older sources as Kuzdoblan, and in Prekmurje Slovene as Küzdobljan), which is derived through contraction of Koz(ma in) Damijan 'Cosmas and Damian', referring to the local church.

== Church ==
The local church in the village is dedicated to Saints Cosmas and Damian and belongs to the Roman Catholic Diocese of Murska Sobota. Since 1964, it has been a parish church. It dates to the first half of the 19th century and was dedicated in 1863. The nave was built upon the plans by the architect Majda Nerima from 28 April 1963 until 1 December that year. That is when the church was used for the worship service for the first time. The interior of the church was decorated in 1964 by the painter Lojze Perko, who used the sgraffito technique.
