= József Szakovics =

Slovene Roman Catholic priest and author

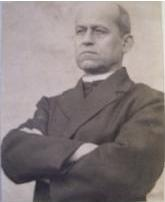
József Szakovics

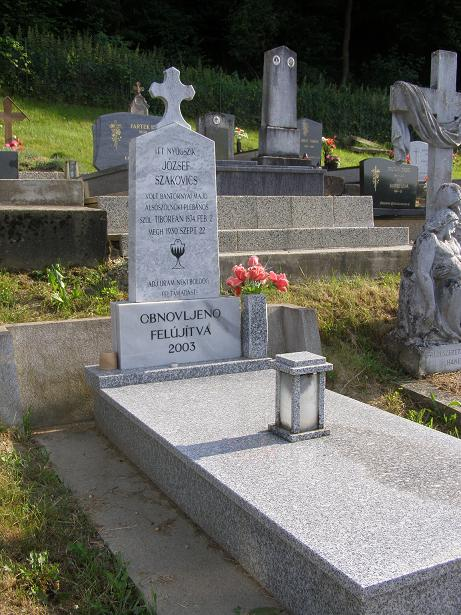
The tomb of Szakovics in Alsószölnök

József Szakovics, Slovene Jožef Sakovič, German orthography Joseph Sakowitsch (February 2, 1874, Vadarci (then known as Tivadarc, in what is now Slovenia) – September 22, 1930, Alsószölnök, Hungary), was a Slovene Roman Catholic priest and author in the Prekmurje region (then known in Hungarian as Vendvidék). Szakovics was a defender of the linguistic rights of the Hungarian Slovenes and their Slovene identity, promoting the use of the Prekmurje Slovene of Slovene.

He was born in Vadarci (Tiborfa before 1919), then in the Hungarian half of Austria-Hungary, as the son of Hungarian Slovenes Mátyás Szakovics and Ilona Mácsek. He studied theology in Szombathely, and was ordained as a priest on July 2, 1899. He served as a parish vicar in Pápóc and a curate in Zalaegerszeg. In 1900, he became a curate in Rechnitz in the region known today as Burgenland, and later in Črenšovci (1901), Tótszentmárton (1902), Tišina (1905), and Weiden bei Rechnitz (1906). In 1906, he became a parish vicar in Beltinci, and in 1909 in Cankova. From 1909 to 1913 he served as a vicar in Alsószölnök, near Szentgotthárd, in an ethnically mixed area inhabited by Germans, Slovenes, and Magyars. From 1913 to 1917, he was a vicar in Turnišče, and later the parish priest there until 1928. He died 1930 in Alsószölnök, Hungary.

In 1904, he revised the prayer-book by Miklós Küzmics (originally published in 1780). This prayer-book had five reprints in the following years and it has been used since by Slovene Catholic families in Prekmurje.

In 1918 Szakovics and other Slovene politicians (József Klekl, Jószef Csárics, Iván Bassa, and István Kühár) worked out a program for an independent Slovene March. This was to have been an autonomous entity within Hungary, or independent country, or constituent of Yugoslavia.

== Works ==
- Molitvena kniga (1904)
- Szvéti evangeliomi (1906, Bad Radkersburg)
- Katolicsanszki katekizmus z galvnimi zgodbami biblije za solare, I.-II. razreda (1907, Budapest)
- Kniga molitvena bogábojecsim düsam dána (1909)

== See also ==
- List of Slovene writers and poets in Hungary
- Culture of Slovenia
- Roman Catholicism in Slovenia
- Roman Catholicism in Hungary
