= Imre Augustich =

Slovene writer, poet and journalist (1837–1879)

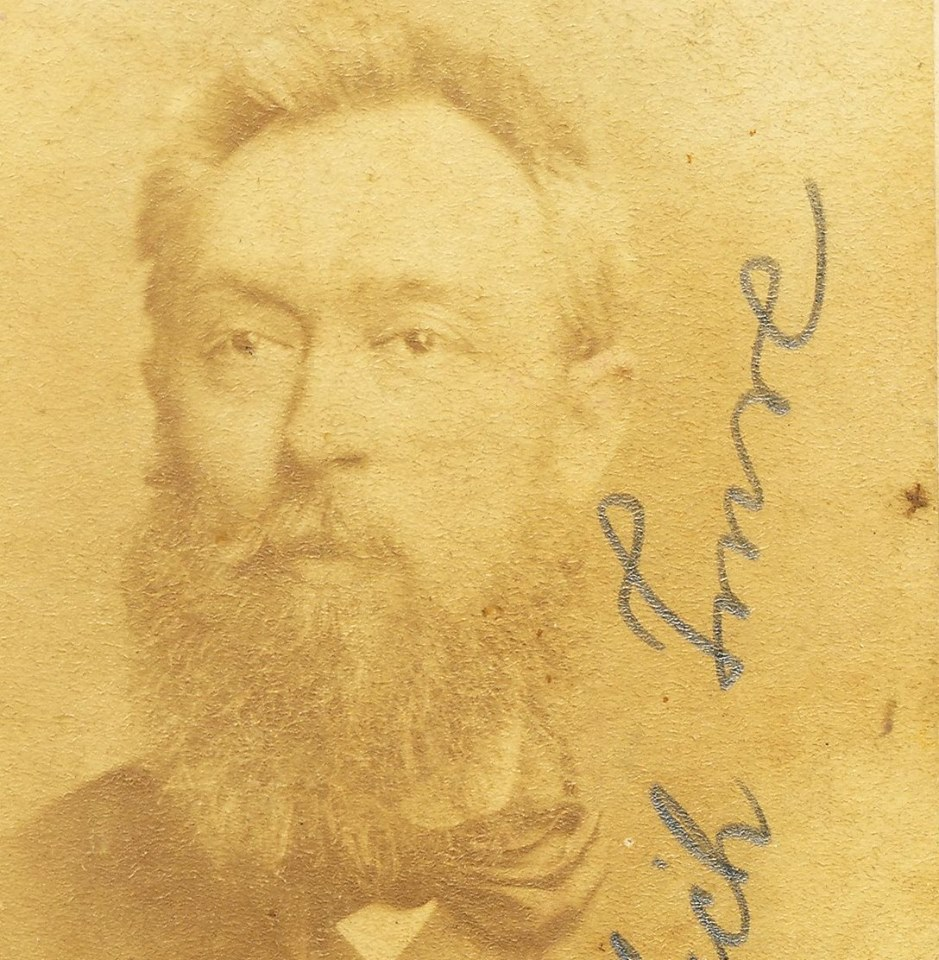
Imre Augustich

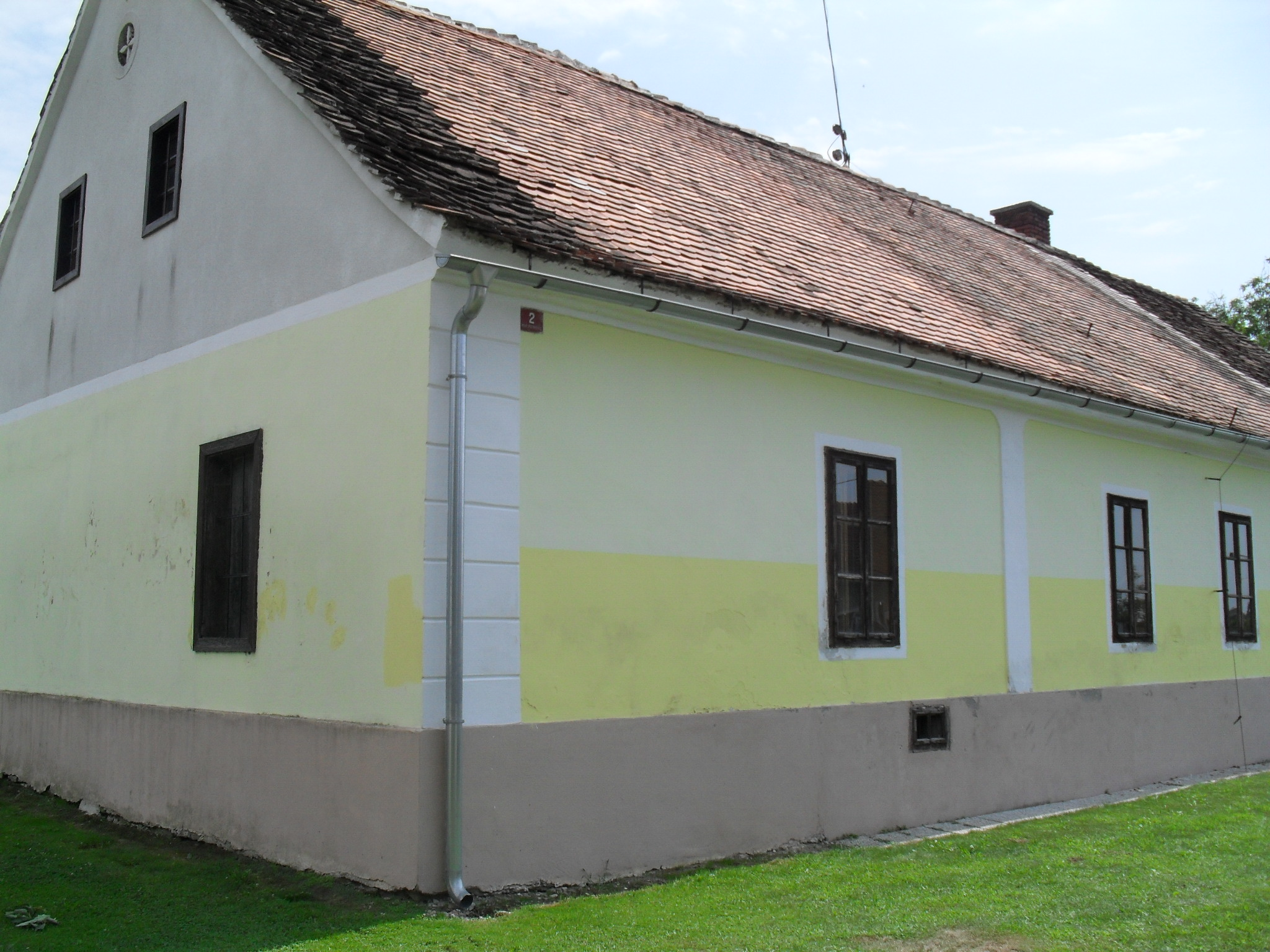
Augustich's birthplace in Murski Petrovci

Imre Augustich or Agostich (Slovene: Imre Augustič September 29/30, 1837 – July 17, 1879) was a Slovene writer, poet, journalist, and representative of Vas county in the National Assembly of Hungary. He was the author of Prijátel (Friend), the first newspaper in Prekmurje Slovene.

Augustich was born in Murski Petrovci (Prekmurje). His father, Lajos Augustich, was a petty nobleman and economic officer for the Szapáry family. His mother, Julianna Zanaty, was born in Szombathely. Augustich studied in Szombathely and Budapest, and early in his career was a notary for the Batthyány family in Murska Sobota and Alsószölnök, and became a reporter and journalist in Budapest.

The first works that Augustich wrote in Hungarian supported magyarization in the Slovene March. Augustich translated verses by Sándor Petőfi, János Arany, Pál Gyulai, and others, at the same time renewing Prekmurje Slovene language and literature.

He died of tuberculosis in Budapest.

== Works ==
- A polgári házasság. Népszerű jog- és társadalmi tudomány dr. H-ain és dr. Ch-nd után. (Pest, 1868.)
- Návuk vogerszkoga jezika za zacsetnike. Budapest, 1876.
- Prirodopis s kepami, 1879
- Prijátel 1875–1879

== Literature ==
- Szinnyei József: Magyar írók élete és munkái I. (Aachs–Bzenszki). Budapest: Hornyánszky. 1891. → Augustich (Agostich) Imre
- Natalija Ulčnik: Začetki prekmurskega časopisja, Zora 67, 2009. Maribor ISBN 978-961-6656-40-5
- Anton Trstenjak: Slovenci na Ogrskem, Narodnapisna in književna črtica, OBJAVA ARHIVSKIH VIROV Maribor 2006. ISBN 961-6507-09-5
- Vilko Novak: Izbor prekmurskega slovstva, Ljubljana 1976.

== See also ==
- List of Slovene writers and poets in Hungary
