= Antal Stevanecz =

Slovene teacher and writer

Antal Števanecz or Steffanecz (Slovene: Anton Števanec; December 29, 1861 – April 12, 1921) was a Slovene teacher and writer in the Austro-Hungarian Empire.

He was born in Vanča Vas, near Tišina (now in Prekmurje). His parents were Mátyás Stevanécz and Zsuzsanna Rátnik. He studied in Kőszeg, and first worked as a teacher in Csurgó (1881–1884), then in Tišina (1881–1887), Heves (1887), and Cankova (1887–1890). From 1890 to 1898 he lived in Apátistvánfalva and worked as a teacher, cantor, and notary.

His prayer book and hymnal in Prekmurje Slovene, Szrcé Jezus, was published in 1896. The prayer book and hymns were partially written by József Borovnyák. The Bishopric of Szombathely banned the book in 1917.

Stevanecz was disheveled and habitually drunk, and the priest and mayor dismissed him from his duties. Between 1898 and 1901 he lived in Kerkakutas, and then in Zalaháshágy. He died in 1921.

== See also ==
- List of Slovene writers and poets in Hungary
- Hungarian Slovenes
