= Evald Flisar =

Slovene writer, poet, playwright, editor and translator

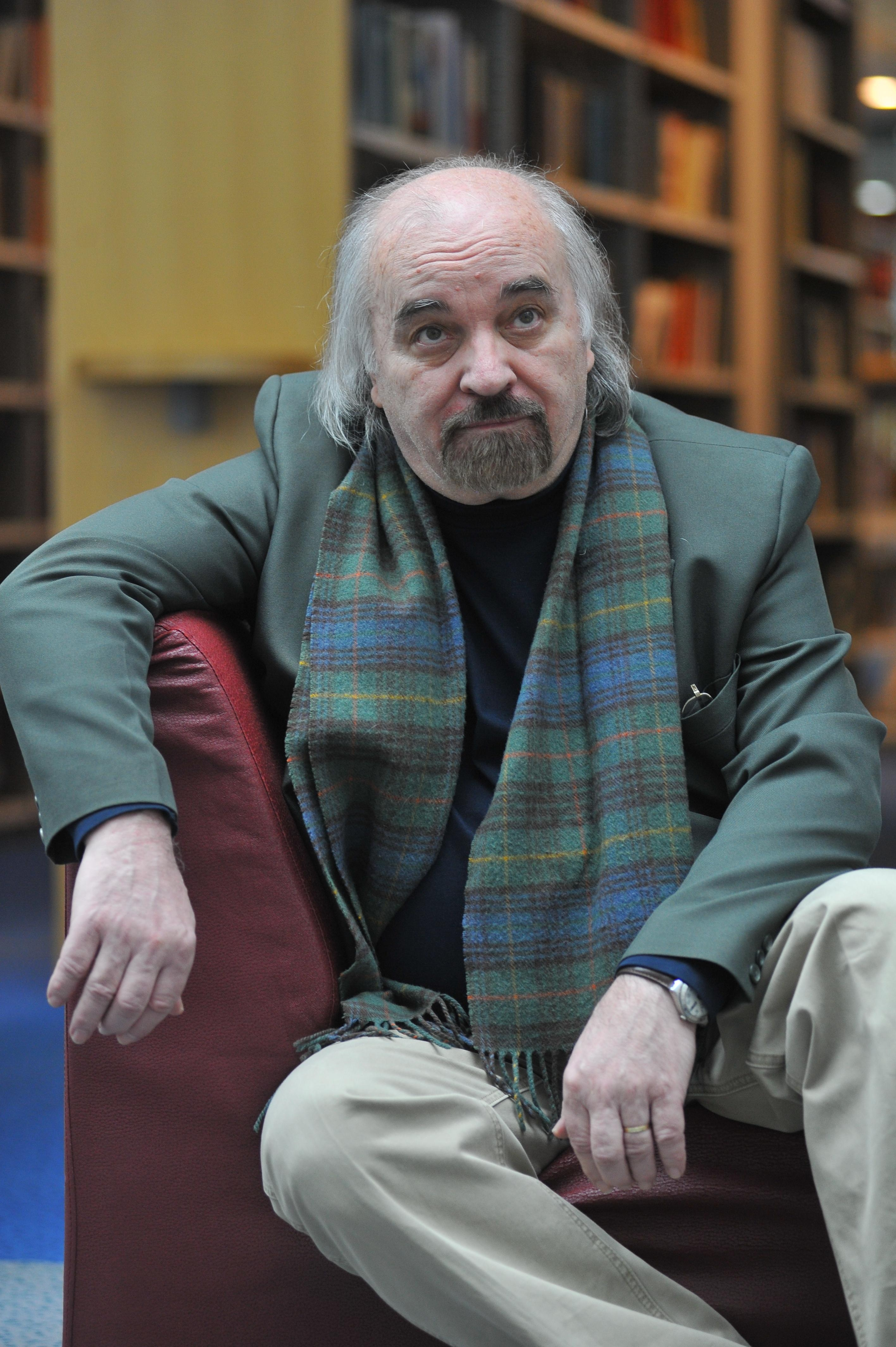
- Evald Flisar, 2015
- Born: 13 February 1945; Gerlinci, Slovenia
- Occupations: Writer, poet, translator, playwright, editor
- Writing career
- Notable works: Čarovnikov vajenec, Popotnik v kraljestvu senc, Kaj pa Leonardo?, Jutri bo lepše
- Website: www.evaldflisar.com

Evald Flisar (born 13 February 1945) is a Slovene writer, poet, playwright, editor and translator. He was president of the Slovene Writers' Association for three consecutive terms between 1995 and 2002 and is editor-in-chief of the literary and cultural magazine Sodobnost.

== Biography ==
Flisar was born in 1945 in Gerlinci in the Prekmurje region of eastern Slovenia. He attended secondary school in Murska Sobota and studied comparative literature at the University of Ljubljana, English and English literature at Chiswick Polytechnic in London and for a while in Australia. Flisar broke into prominence in 1986, when he published the novel Čarovnikov vajenec (The sourcerer's apprentice), which is the most read Slovenian novel of the 20th century. Many of his books are travelogues and he is also an acclaimed playwright. He received the Prešeren Foundation Award in 1993 for his travelogue Popotnik v kraljestvu senc and his plays Kaj pa Leonardo? and Jutri bo lepše. In 2023, Flisar was elected to Slovenian Academy of Sciences and Arts. At that point, he was the most translated living Slovenian writer.

== Published works ==
=== Poetry ===
- Symphonia poetica (1966)

=== Prose ===
- Mrgolenje prahu (1968, novel)
- Umiranje v ogledalu (1969, novel)
- Tisoč in ena pot (1979, travelogue)
- Južno od severa (1981, travelogue)
- Lov na lovca (1984, short stories)
- Čarovnikov vajenec (1986, novel)
- Noro življenje (1989, travelogue)
- Popotnik v kraljestvu senc (1992, travelogue)
- Potovanje predaleč (1998, novel)
- Zgodbe s poti (2000, short stories)
- Velika žival samote (2001, novel)
- Ljubezni tri in ena smrt (2002, novel)
- Čaj s kraljico (2004, novel)
- Mogoče nikoli (2007, novel)
- Opazovalec (2009, novel)
- Na zlati obali (2010, novel)
- To nisem jaz: legoroman (2011, novel)
- Dekle, ki bi raje bilo drugje (2012, novel)
- Začarani Odisej (2013, novel)
- Alica v Poteruniji: roman v stripu (2013)
- Tam me boš našel (2014)
- Besede nad oblaki (2015)
- Spogledovanja z dvojnikom: knjiga knjig (2016)
- Zbiralec sanj (2017)
- Greh (new edition of Mrgolenje prahu, 2018)
- Poglej skozi okno (2018)
- Moje kraljestvo umira (My kingdom is dying, 2020, novel)
- Nevidni ot®ok (2021)
- Trgovec z dušami (2023)
- Zbogom sonce (2025)

== Prose Translated into English ==
- My Father's Dreams, Istros Books, London 2015.
- My kingdom is dying, Istros Books, London 2025, translated by David Limon.

=== Plays ===
- Sodniška zgradba (1969, radio play)
- Vojaki ob koncu vojne (1970, radio play)
- Kostanjeva krona (1970)
- Ukradena hiša (1972, radio play)
- Nimfa umre (1989)
- Jutri bo lepše (1992)
- Kaj pa Leonardo? (1992)
- Naglavisvet (1993, radio play)
- Tristan in Izolda: igra o ljubezni in smrti (1994)
- Stric iz Amerike (1994)
- Iztrohnjeno srce (1995)
- Temna stran svetlobe (1995, radio play)
- Angleško poletje (1997, radio play)
- Sončne pege (1998)
- Padamo, padamo (1998)
- Poslednja nedolžnost (1999)
- Enajsti planet (2000)
- Nora Nora (2004)
- Akvarij (2007)
- Alica v nori deželi (2010)
- Antigona zdaj (2012)

=== Children's literature ===
- Pikpokec postane svetovni prvak (2007)
- Alica v nori deželi (2008)
