= István Kühár =

Slovene Roman Catholic priest, politician and writer

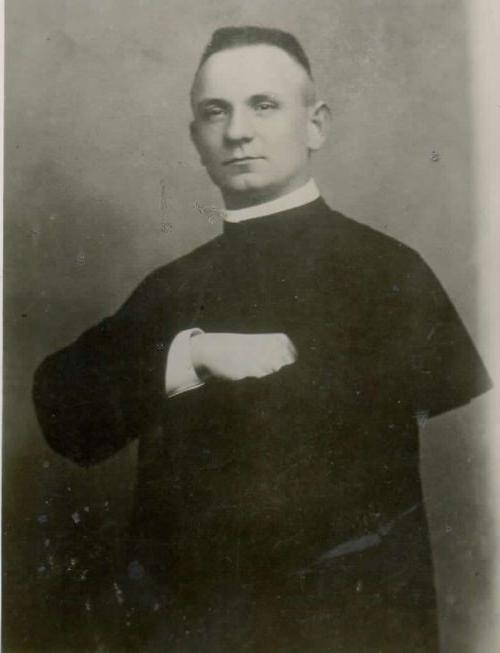
- Born: August 28, 1887; Gradišče, Tišina
- Died: January 1, 1922 (aged 34)
- Occupations: Roman Catholic priest; politician; writer

István Kühár (Slovene: Števan Kühar) (August 28, 1887 – January 1, 1922) was a Slovene Roman Catholic priest, politician, and writer in Hungary, and later in Yugoslavia.

He was born in Gradišče, near Tišina, to József Kühár and Katalin Gombócz. His mother was a daughter of a petty nobleman. His brother János Kühar was also a writer that promoted Prekmurje Slovene. Between 1917 and 1922, he was the parish priest in Beltinci.

Politically, Kühar favored the secession of the Hungarian Slovenes from Hungary and their autonomy in Slovenia. Kühar, József Klekl, József Szakovics, József Csárics, and Iván Bassa advocated autonomy for Prekmurje in 1918 and 1919. After World War I, Kühar identified with Prekmurje Slovene in Yugoslavia. Kühar was an editor of the Catholic newspaper Marijin list.

== Sources ==
- Források a Muravidék Történetéhez (Viri za zgodovino Prekmurja) 2. Szombathely-Zalaegerszeg 2008. ISBN 978-963-7227-19-6
- Vasi digitális könyvtár – Vasi egyházmegye

== See also ==
- Slovene March (Kingdom of Hungary)
- List of Slovene writers and poets in Hungary
