= Municipality of Cankova =

Municipality of Slovenia

Municipality of Cankova Občina Cankova
- Municipality
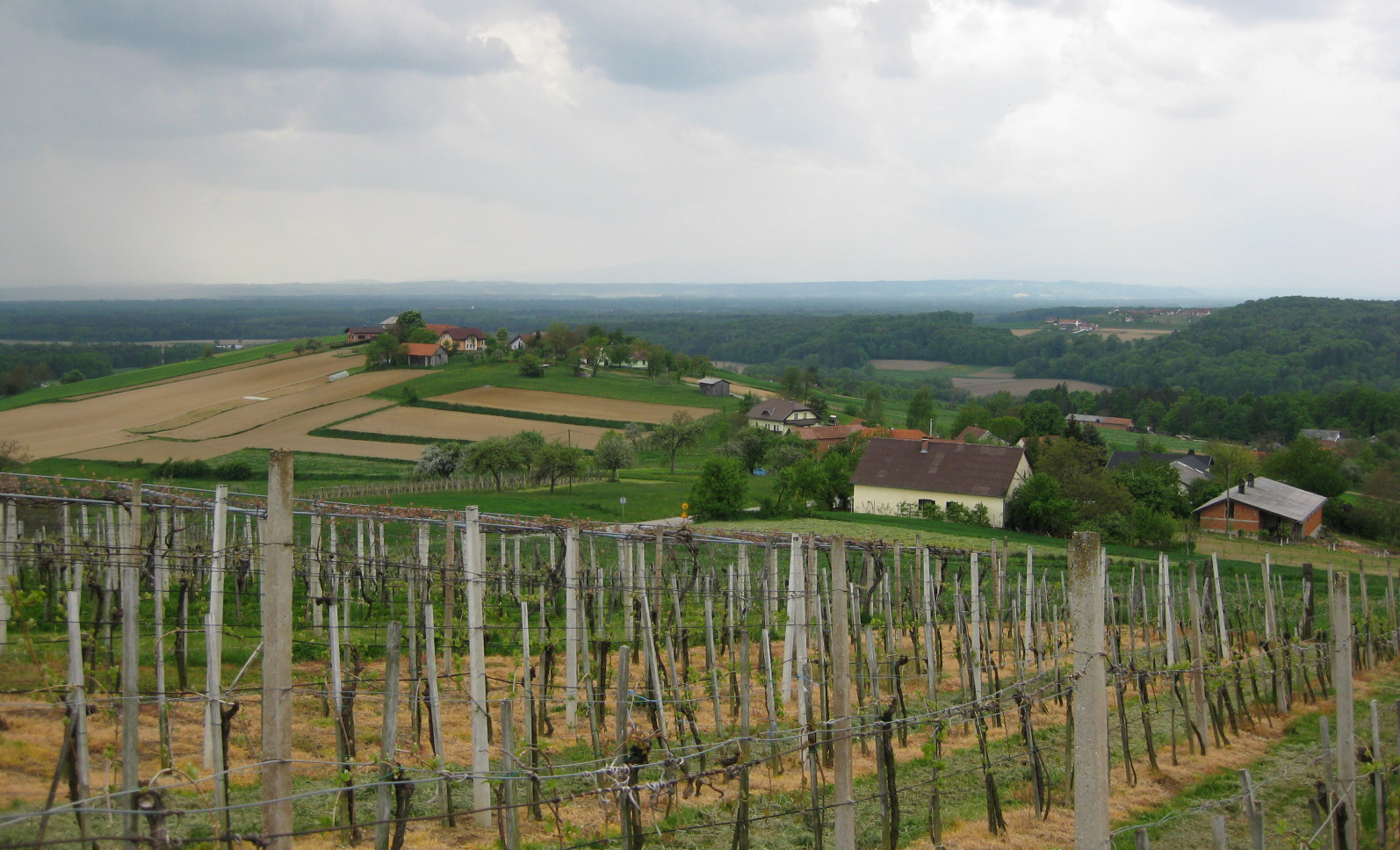

- Location of the Municipality of Cankova in Slovenia
- Coordinates: 46°43′N 16°01′E
- Country: Slovenia

Government
  - Mayor: Danilo Kacijan (Independent)

Area
  - Total: 30.6 km^{2} (11.8 sq mi)

Population (July 1, 2018)
  - Total: 1,718
  - Density: 56.1/km^{2} (145/sq mi)
- Time zone: UTC+01 (CET)
  - Summer (DST): UTC+02 (CEST)
- Website: www.cankova.si

The Municipality of Cankova (pronounced [ˈtsaːŋkɔʋa]; Slovene: Občina Cankova) is a municipality in the Prekmurje region of Slovenia. The seat of the municipality is the town of Cankova. It borders Austria.

== Settlements ==
In addition to the municipal seat of Cankova, the municipality also includes the following settlements:

- Domajinci
- Gerlinci
- Gornji Črnci
- Korovci
- Krašči
- Skakovci
- Topolovci

== History ==
The area was originally part of the Municipality of Murska Sobota. In 1995, the Municipality of Cankova–Tišina was formed, which existed until 1999, when Tišina became a separate municipality.
