= Čaj s kraljico =

2004 novel by Evald Flisar

- Author: Evald Flisar
- Original title: Čaj s kraljico
- Language: Slovenian
- Publisher: Mladinska knjiga
- Publication date: 2004
- Publication place: Slovenia
- Pages: 553
- ISBN: 86-11-16794-5

Čaj s kraljico is a novel by Slovenian author Evald Flisar. It was first published in 2004 by Mladinska knjiga. It was Digitized in 2009.

== Plot ==
Vili Vaupotič, a young academic painter, goes to London to reap fame and success with his works of art. On the way across the English Channel, he sees his ideal of love and female beauty, Sandrina, with whom he has not met for a long time. Vili is constantly losing his paintings, but his life's journey from the countryside to a prestigious mansion, where he eventually lands as a family portraitist, ends with the betrothal of the "Queen of Egypt" seeking a rich man and shattering the myth of the perfect Sandrina.

== See also ==
- List of Slovenian novels
