= Gornji Črnci =

- Location in Slovenia
- Coordinates: 46°44′13.7″N 16°1′19.71″E
- Country: Slovenia
- Traditional region: Prekmurje
- Statistical region: Mura
- Municipality: Cankova

Area
  - Total: 1.59 km^{2} (0.61 sq mi)
- Elevation: 242.1 m (794 ft)

Population (2020)
  - Total: 135
  - Density: 84.9/km^{2} (220/sq mi)

Gornji Črnci (pronounced [ˈɡoːɾnji ˈtʃəɾntsi]; Hungarian: Királyszék) is a village in the Municipality of Cankova in the Prekmurje region of northeastern Slovenia.

== Name ==
Gornji Črnci was attested in historical sources in 1366 as Korlatfalua, a corruption of Hungarian Konradfalva (i.e., 'Konrad's village'). Today's Slovenian name Gornji Črnci (literally, 'upper Črnci') is derived from Črnec Creek, a tributary of the Ledava River that flows through the village.
