= Gradišče, Tišina =

Gradišče
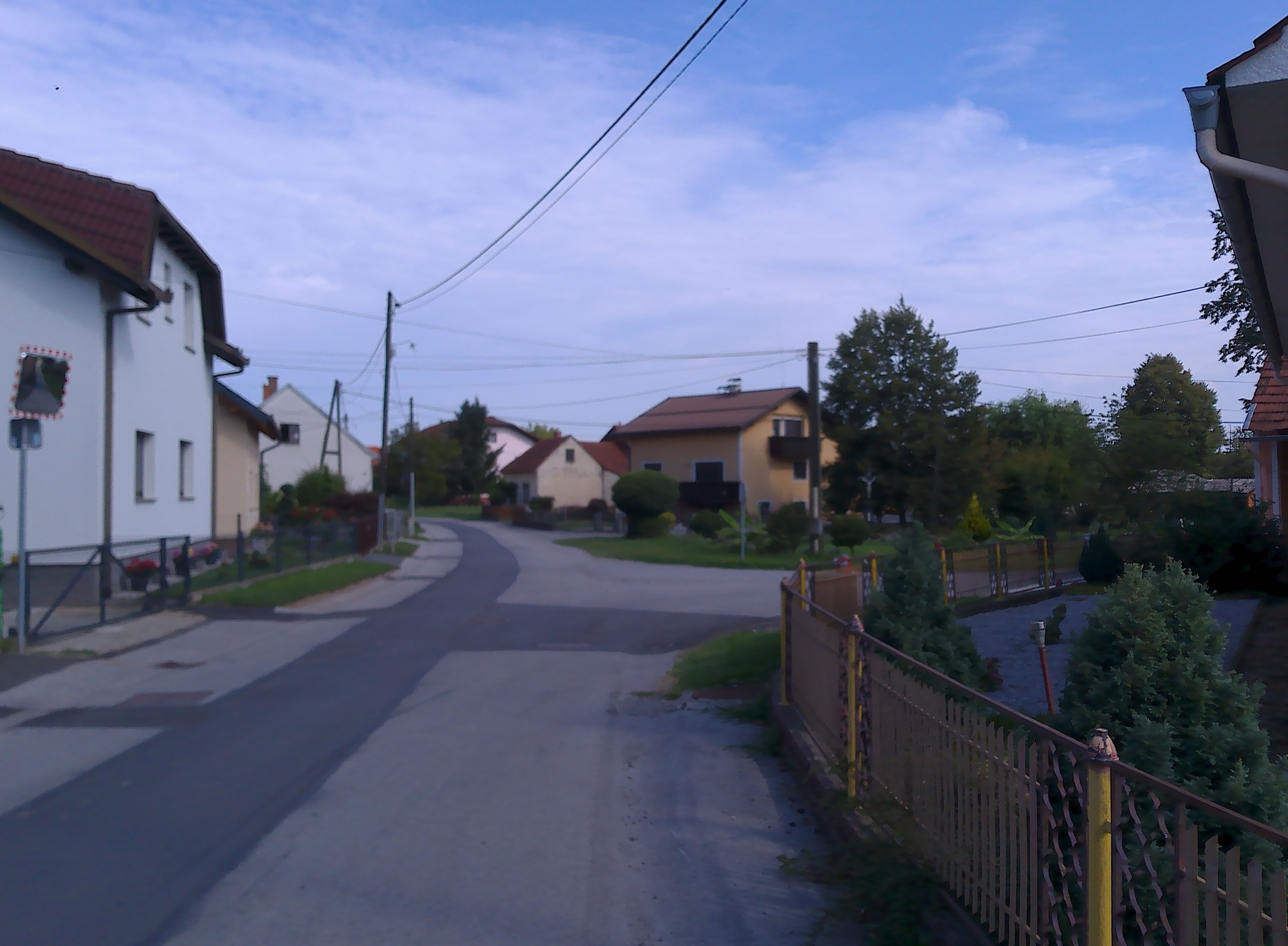
- A street in Gradišče

- Location in Slovenia
- Coordinates: 46°38′40.27″N 16°6′15.33″E
- Country: Slovenia
- Traditional region: Prekmurje
- Statistical region: Mura
- Municipality: Tišina

Area
  - Total: 2.8 km^{2} (1.1 sq mi)
- Elevation: 193.9 m (636 ft)

Population (2002)
  - Total: 375
  - Density: 130/km^{2} (350/sq mi)

Gradišče (pronounced [ɡɾaˈdiːʃtʃɛ]; Hungarian: Muravárhely) is a small village in the Municipality of Tišina in the Prekmurje region of northeastern Slovenia.

János Kühár (1901–1987), a priest and writer in Prekmurje Slovene active in Vas County, Hungary, and his brother István Kühár, a politician, were born in Gradišče.
