= Vadarci =

Vadarci Tiborfa
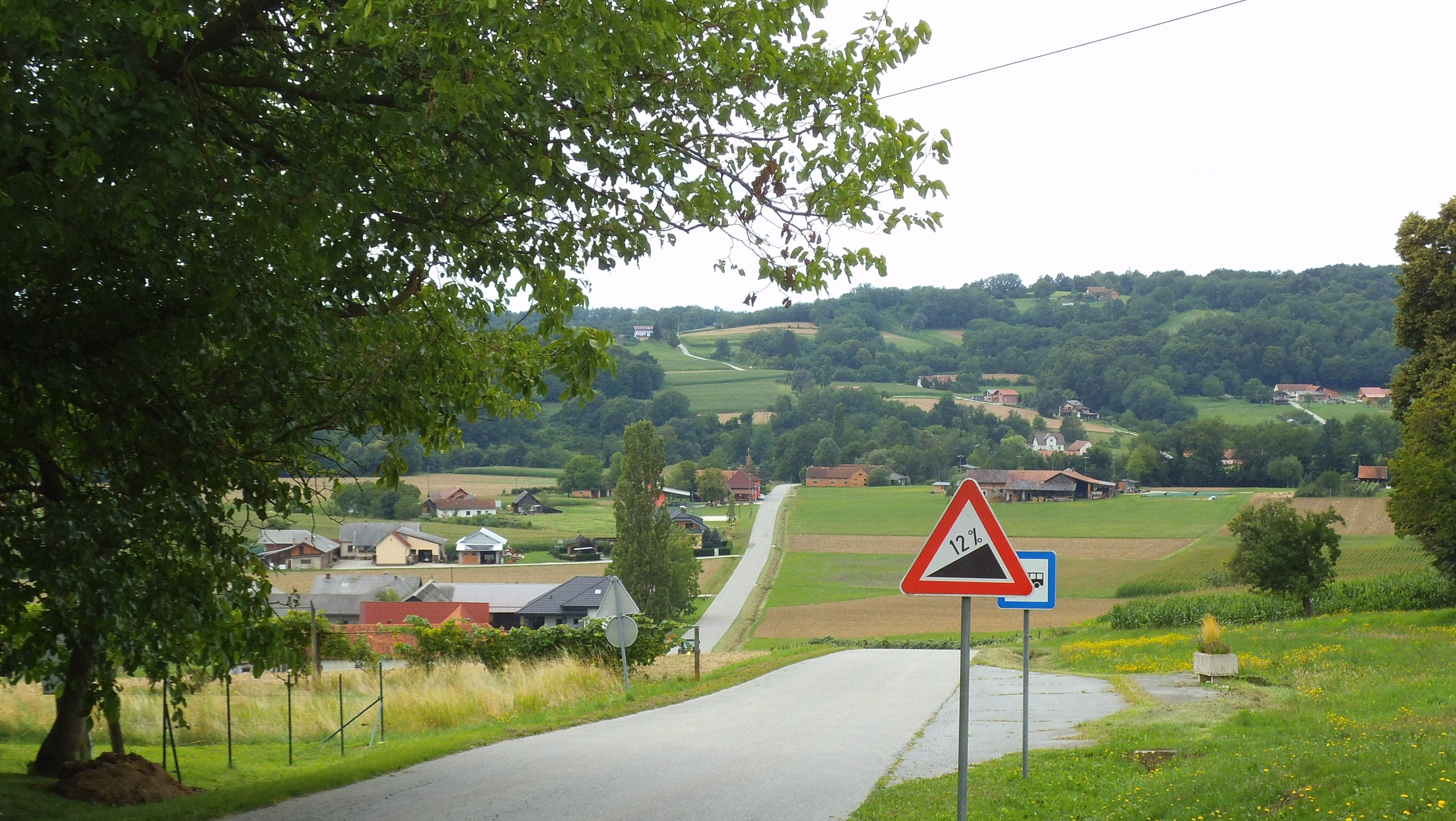

- Location in Slovenia
- Coordinates: 46°45′3.67″N 16°4′6.52″E
- Country: Slovenia
- Traditional region: Prekmurje
- Statistical region: Mura
- Municipality: Puconci

Area
  - Total: 5.75 km^{2} (2.22 sq mi)
- Elevation: 236.9 m (777 ft)

Population (2002)
  - Total: 378

Vadarci (pronounced [ˈʋaːdaɾtsi]; Hungarian: Tiborfa) is a settlement in the Municipality of Puconci in the Prekmurje region of Slovenia.

== Notable people ==
Notable people that were born or lived in Vadarci include:

- József Szakovics (1874–1930), writer
