= Kerkakutas =

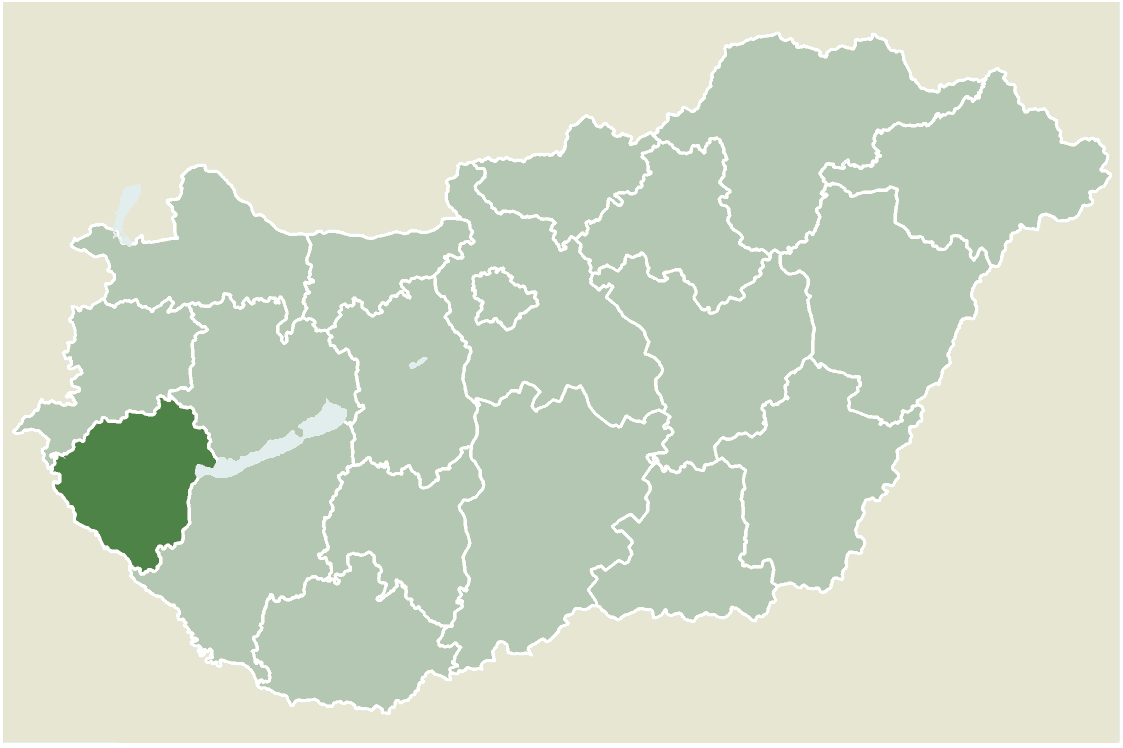
- Location of Zala county in Hungary

- Location of Kerkakutas
- Coordinates: 46.75994°N 16.50430°E
- Country: Hungary
- County: Zala

Area
  - Total: 20.07 km^{2} (7.75 sq mi)

Population (2004)
  - Total: 151
  - Density: 7.52/km^{2} (19.5/sq mi)
- Time zone: UTC+1 (CET)
  - Summer (DST): UTC+2 (CEST)
- Postal code: 8973
- Area code: 92

Kerkakutas is a village in Zala County, Hungary.

== Notable residents ==
- László Pintér, Hungarian politician, MP
- Antal Stevanecz, Slovene teacher and writer
