= Zalaháshágy =

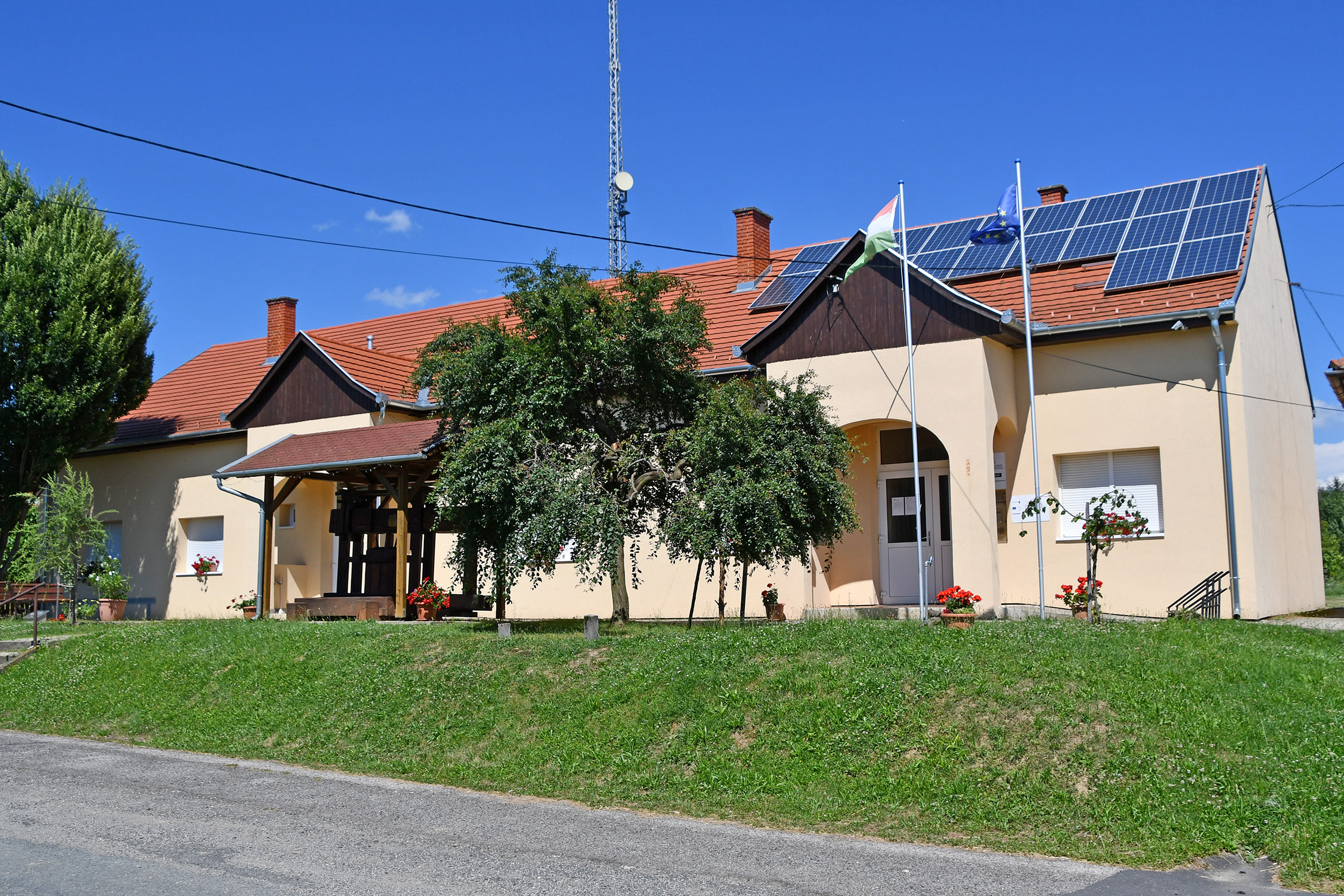
- Village hall

- Flag Coat of arms

- Location of Zalaháshágy in Hungary
- Coordinates: 46°53′12.55″N 16°37′48.61″E
- Country: Hungary
- Region: Western Transdanubia
- County: Zala
- Subregion: Zalaegerszegi
- Rank: Village

Area
  - Total: 12.13 km^{2} (4.68 sq mi)

Population (1 January 2008)
  - Total: 378
  - Density: 31.2/km^{2} (80.7/sq mi)
- Time zone: UTC+1 (CET)
  - Summer (DST): UTC+2 (CEST)
- Postal code: 8997
- Area code: +36 92
- KSH code: 23834
- Website: www.zalahashagy.hu

Zalaháshágy is a village in Zala County, in Hungary.

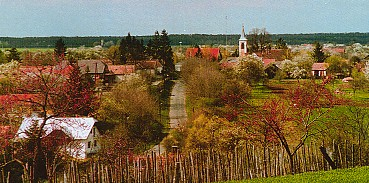
Zalaháshágy village with the church

== Geography ==
The Zala-hills form a river cut hilly region in West Hungary. Zala river crosses over the region. The system of riverbeds and valleys were formed in the Cainozoic geological period.

== Notable residents ==
- Antal Stevanecz, Slovene teacher and writer
