= Rankovci =

- Location in Slovenia
- Coordinates: 46°40′23.24″N 16°5′10.61″E
- Country: Slovenia
- Traditional region: Prekmurje
- Statistical region: Mura
- Municipality: Tišina

Area
  - Total: 2.62 km^{2} (1.01 sq mi)
- Elevation: 197.9 m (649 ft)

Population (2002)
  - Total: 254

Rankovci (pronounced [ɾaŋˈkoːu̯tsi]; Hungarian: Ferenczlak or Ferencfalva) is a village in the Municipality of Tišina in the Prekmurje region of northeastern Slovenia.

== Notable people ==
Notable people that were born or lived in Rankovci include:

- Feri Kühar (1916–1945), the first sculptor from Prekmurje
