= Murski Petrovci =

- Location in Slovenia
- Coordinates: 46°39′52.01″N 16°3′6.73″E
- Country: Slovenia
- Traditional region: Prekmurje
- Statistical region: Mura
- Municipality: Tišina

Area
  - Total: 1.63 km^{2} (0.63 sq mi)
- Elevation: 200.1 m (656 ft)

Population (2002)
  - Total: 125

Murski Petrovci (pronounced [ˈmuːɾski pɛˈtɾoːu̯tsi]; Hungarian: Murapetrócz) is a village in the Municipality of Tišina in the Prekmurje region of northeastern Slovenia, next to the border with Austria.

The writer, poet, translator, and journalist Imre Augustich was born in Murski Petrovci.
