= Domajinci =

Domajinci Domaginci
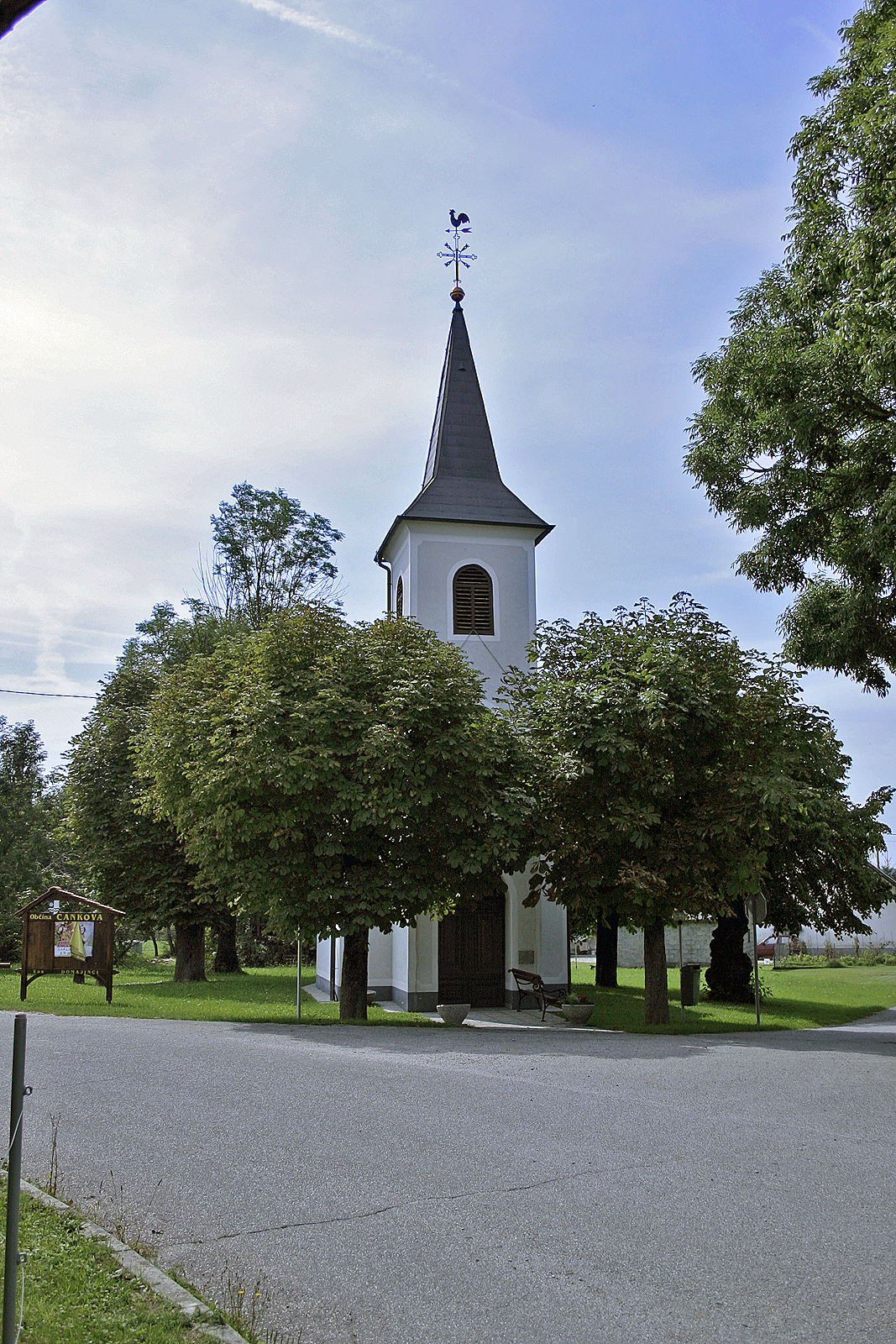

- Location in Slovenia
- Coordinates: 46°44′16.25″N 16°2′36.07″E
- Country: Slovenia
- Traditional region: Prekmurje
- Statistical region: Mura
- Municipality: Cankova

Area
  - Total: 3.46 km^{2} (1.34 sq mi)
- Elevation: 219.2 m (719 ft)

Population (2020)
  - Total: 203
  - Density: 58.7/km^{2} (152/sq mi)

Domajinci (pronounced [dɔmaˈjiːntsi]; Hungarian: Dombalja, Prekmurje Slovene: Domaginci) is a village in the Municipality of Cankova in the Prekmurje region of northeastern Slovenia.

There is a small chapel in the settlement. It was built in 1880.
