= Borejci =

- Location in Slovenia
- Coordinates: 46°40′48.39″N 16°5′55.36″E
- Country: Slovenia
- Traditional region: Prekmurje
- Statistical region: Mura
- Municipality: Tišina

Area
  - Total: 3.68 km^{2} (1.42 sq mi)
- Elevation: 197.5 m (648 ft)

Population (2002)
  - Total: 251

Borejci (pronounced [bɔˈɾeːi̯tsi]; Hungarian: Borhida) is a small village in the Municipality of Tišina in the Prekmurje region of northeastern Slovenia.
