= Murski Črnci =

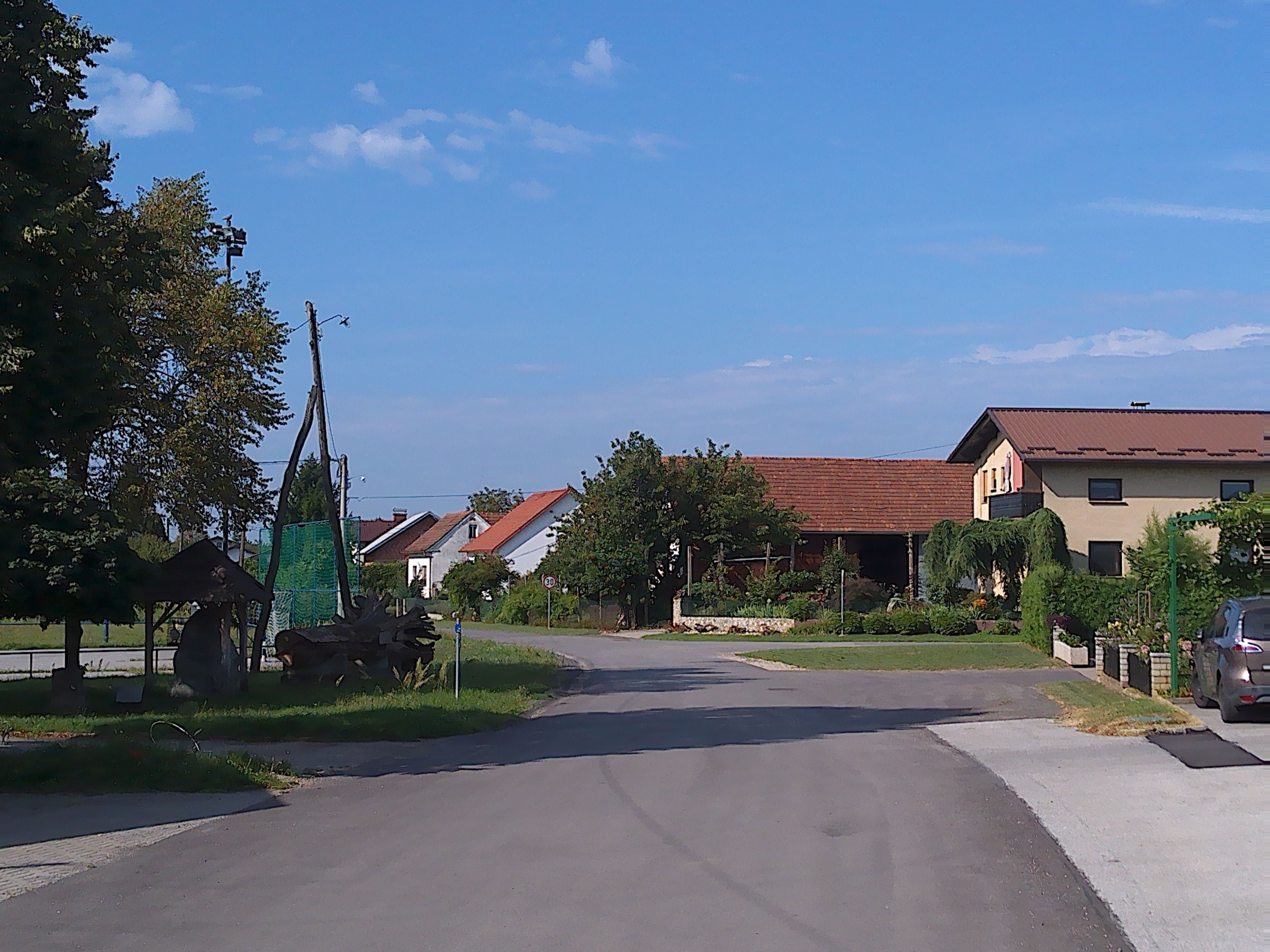

- Location in Slovenia
- Coordinates: 46°38′15.66″N 16°6′47.74″E
- Country: Slovenia
- Traditional region: Prekmurje
- Statistical region: Mura
- Municipality: Tišina

Area
  - Total: 3.53 km^{2} (1.36 sq mi)
- Elevation: 192.1 m (630 ft)

Population (2002)
  - Total: 375

Murski Črnci (pronounced [ˈmuːɾski ˈtʃəɾntsi]; Hungarian: Muracsermely) is a village in the Municipality of Tišina in the Prekmurje region of northeastern Slovenia.

There is a small chapel in the centre of the village. It was built in 1896 and 1897 in the Neo-Gothic style.
