= Tropovci =

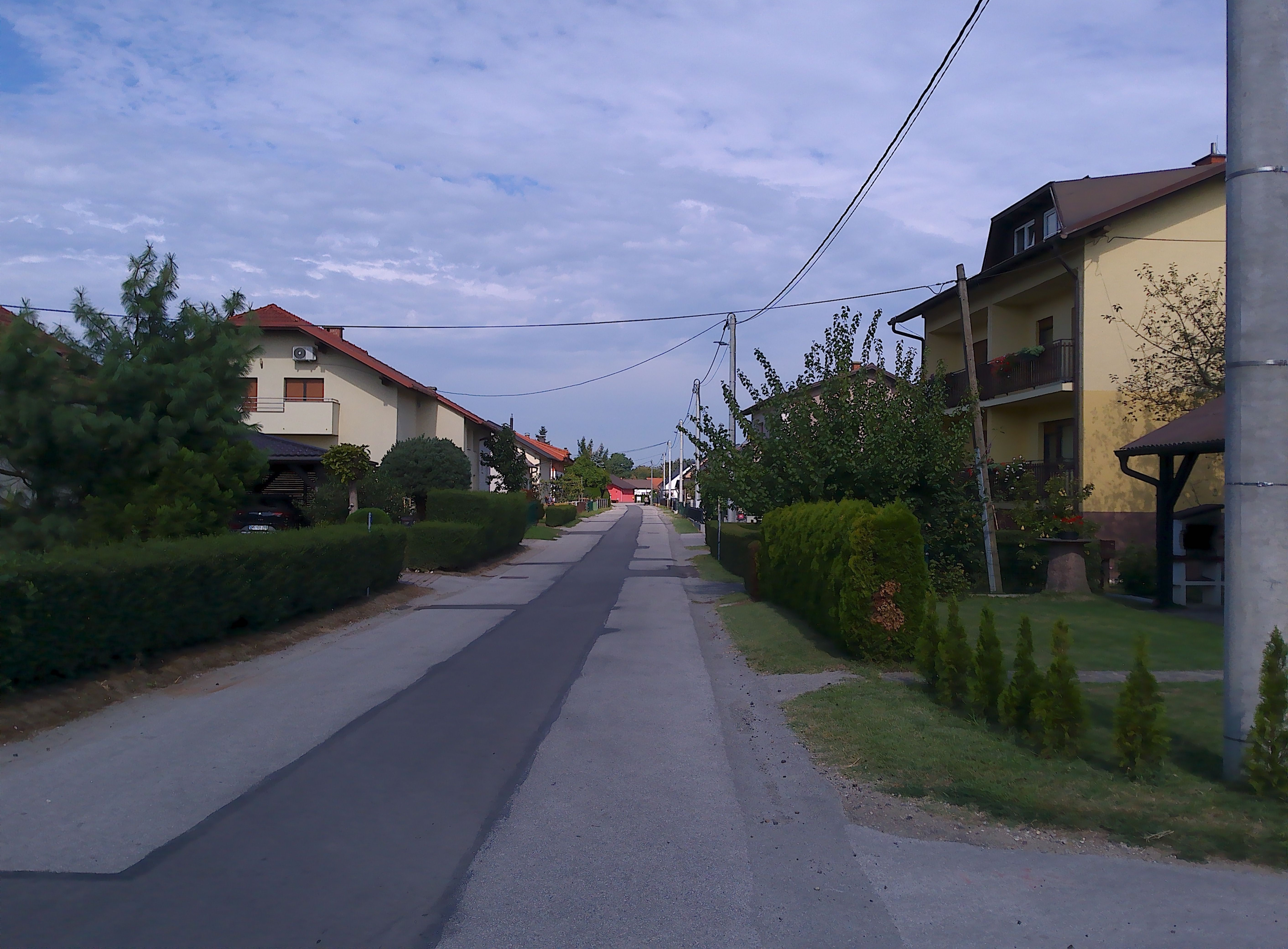

- Location in Slovenia
- Coordinates: 46°38′53.64″N 16°5′51.14″E
- Country: Slovenia
- Traditional region: Prekmurje
- Statistical region: Mura
- Municipality: Tišina

Area
  - Total: 2.64 km^{2} (1.02 sq mi)
- Elevation: 194.4 m (638 ft)

Population (2002)
  - Total: 488

Tropovci (pronounced [ˈtɾoːpɔu̯tsi]; Hungarian: Murafüzes) is a village in the Municipality of Tišina in the Prekmurje region of northeastern Slovenia.
