= Sodišinci =

- Location in Slovenia
- Coordinates: 46°40′19.63″N 16°2′56.44″E
- Country: Slovenia
- Traditional region: Prekmurje
- Statistical region: Mura
- Municipality: Tišina

Area
  - Total: 2.88 km^{2} (1.11 sq mi)
- Elevation: 200.3 m (657 ft)

Population (2002)
  - Total: 212

Sodišinci (pronounced [sɔˈdiːʃintsi]; Hungarian: Birószék) is a village in the Municipality of Tišina in the Prekmurje region of northeastern Slovenia.

There is a small chapel in the village. It was built in 1901 in the Neo-Gothic style.
