= Korovci =

- Location in Slovenia
- Coordinates: 46°43′42.22″N 16°0′14.58″E
- Country: Slovenia
- Traditional region: Prekmurje
- Statistical region: Mura
- Municipality: Cankova

Area
  - Total: 5.17 km^{2} (2.00 sq mi)
- Elevation: 222.8 m (731 ft)

Population (2020)
  - Total: 166
  - Density: 32.1/km^{2} (83.2/sq mi)

Korovci (pronounced [kɔˈɾoːu̯tsi]; Hungarian: Károlyfa, Prekmurje Slovene: Korouvci, German: Karlsdorf) is a village in the Municipality of Cankova in the Prekmurje region of northeastern Slovenia, right on the border with Austria.
