= Topolovci =

Topolovci Topolouvci
- Location in Slovenia
- Coordinates: 46°43′51.63″N 16°2′36.54″E
- Country: Slovenia
- Traditional region: Prekmurje
- Statistical region: Mura
- Municipality: Cankova

Area
  - Total: 2.62 km^{2} (1.01 sq mi)
- Elevation: 214.7 m (704 ft)

Population (2020)
  - Total: 55
  - Density: 21/km^{2} (54/sq mi)

Topolovci (pronounced [tɔpɔˈloːu̯tsi]; Hungarian: Jegenyés, Prekmurje Slovene: Topolouvci) is a small village in the Municipality of Cankova in the Prekmurje region of northeastern Slovenia.
