= Gederovci =

- Location in Slovenia
- Coordinates: 46°40′46.37″N 16°3′11.55″E
- Country: Slovenia
- Traditional region: Prekmurje
- Statistical region: Mura
- Municipality: Tišina

Area
  - Total: 1.82 km^{2} (0.70 sq mi)
- Elevation: 200.8 m (659 ft)

Population (2002)
  - Total: 173

Gederovci (pronounced [ɡɛˈdeːɾɔu̯tsi]; Hungarian: Kőhida) is a small village in the Municipality of Tišina in the Prekmurje region of northeastern Slovenia, right on the border with Austria.
