= László Pintér (politician) =

Hungarian politician

Member of the National Assembly
- In office 14 May 2010 – 5 May 2014

Personal details
- Born: 12 November 1950 (age 75) Kerkakutas, Hungary
- Party: Fidesz (since 2003)
- Other political affiliations: FKGP
- Profession: politician

László Pintér (born 12 November 1950) is a Hungarian politician, member of the National Assembly (MP) for Lenti (Zala County Constituency IV) between 2010 and 2014. He served as mayor of his birthplace, Kerkakutas between 1990 and 2006.

He was a candidate for MP as a member of the Independent Smallholders, Agrarian Workers and Civic Party (FKGP) during the 1998 parliamentary election. After the disintegration of the FKGP he joined Fidesz in 2003. He was appointed vice president of the General Assembly of Zala County in 2006. He was a member of the Committee on Foreign Affairs from 14 May 2010 to 5 May 2014.
