= Ljubezni tri in ena smrt =

2002 novel by Evald Flisar

Three loves, one death
- Author: Evald Flisar
- Original title: Ljubezni tri in ena smrt
- Translator: David Limon
- Language: Slovenian
- Publication date: 2002
- Publication place: Slovenia
- English publication date: 2016
- OCLC: 966593995

Ljubezni tri in ena smrt is a novel by Slovenian author Evald Flisar. It was first published in 2002.

== See also ==
- List of Slovenian novels
