= Vanča Vas =

Vanča Vas Vanča ves
- Location in Slovenia
- Coordinates: 46°40′6.43″N 16°5′40.39″E
- Country: Slovenia
- Traditional region: Prekmurje
- Statistical region: Mura
- Municipality: Tišina

Area
  - Total: 6.99 km^{2} (2.70 sq mi)
- Elevation: 195.9 m (643 ft)

Population (2002)
  - Total: 509

Vanča Vas (pronounced [ˈʋaːntʃa ˈʋaːs]; Slovene: Vanča vas, Hungarian: Ivánfalva, Prekmurje Slovene: Vanča Ves) is a village in the Municipality of Tišina in the Prekmurje region of northeastern Slovenia.

The writer Antal Stevanecz was born in Vanča Vas.
