= Skakovci =

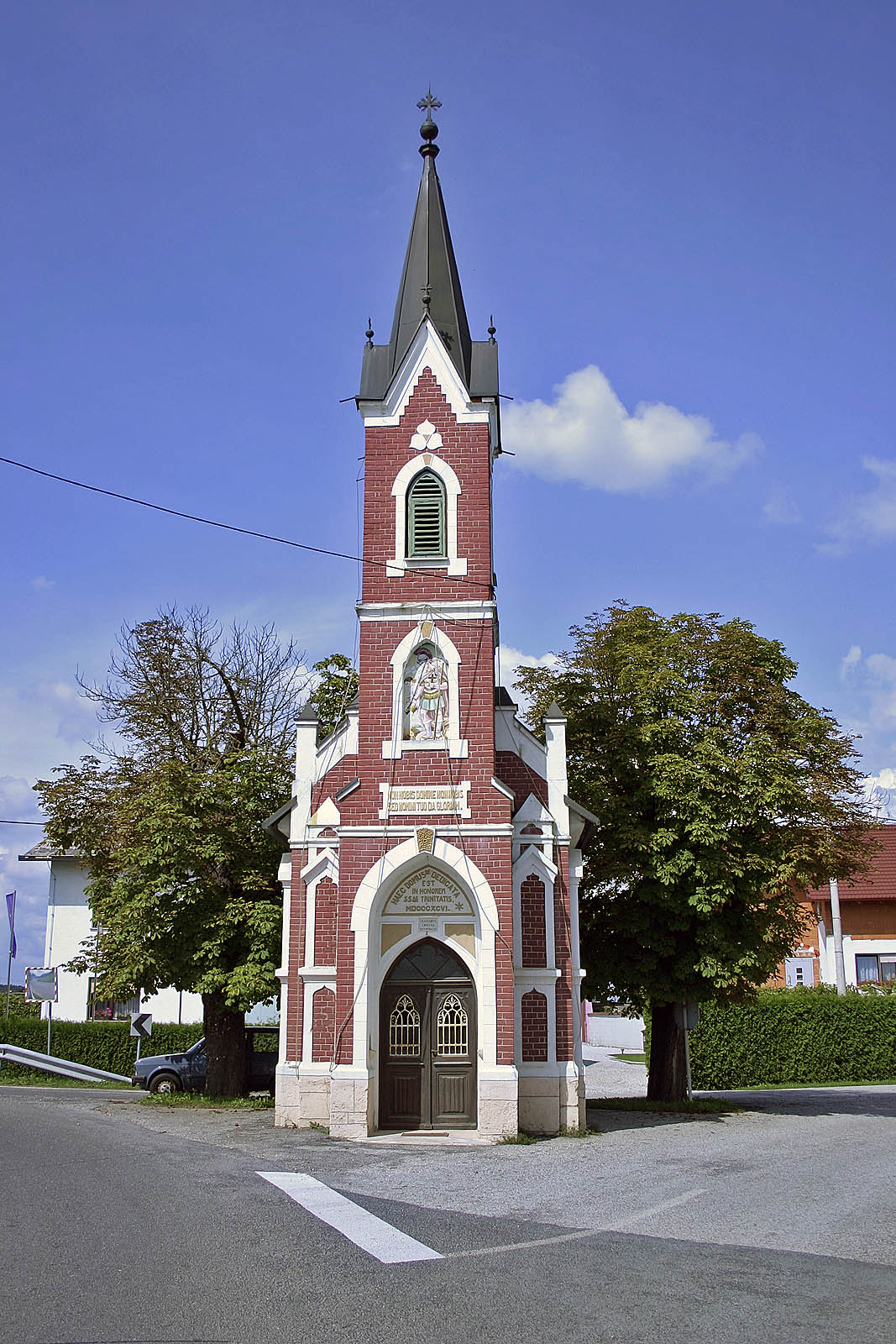
- Chapel at Skakovci

- Location in Slovenia
- Coordinates: 46°42′24.33″N 16°2′56.04″E
- Country: Slovenia
- Traditional region: Prekmurje
- Statistical region: Mura
- Municipality: Cankova

Area
  - Total: 5.03 km^{2} (1.94 sq mi)
- Elevation: 206.9 m (679 ft)

Population (2020)
  - Total: 203
  - Density: 40.4/km^{2} (105/sq mi)
- Postal code: 9261
- Vehicle registration: MS

Skakovci (pronounced [ˈskaːkɔu̯tsi]; Hungarian: Szécsényifalva) is a village in the Municipality of Cankova in the Prekmurje region of northeastern Slovenia.

There is a small chapel in the settlement. It is built of red brick and has a three-storey belfry. A commemorative plaque dedicated to victims of cholera dates the building to 1832. It is dedicated to the Holy Trinity and belongs to the Parish of Cankova.

There is an engraving of the chapel on the gravestone of Anton Sinko, in the Avondale Cemetery, in Stratford, Ontario, Canada. Born at his home in Skakovci in 1933, Anton emigrated to Canada in the late 1950s, settled in Stratford, married Elizabeth Glosnek, and raised six children. He died in 2007, age 73.
