= Cankova =

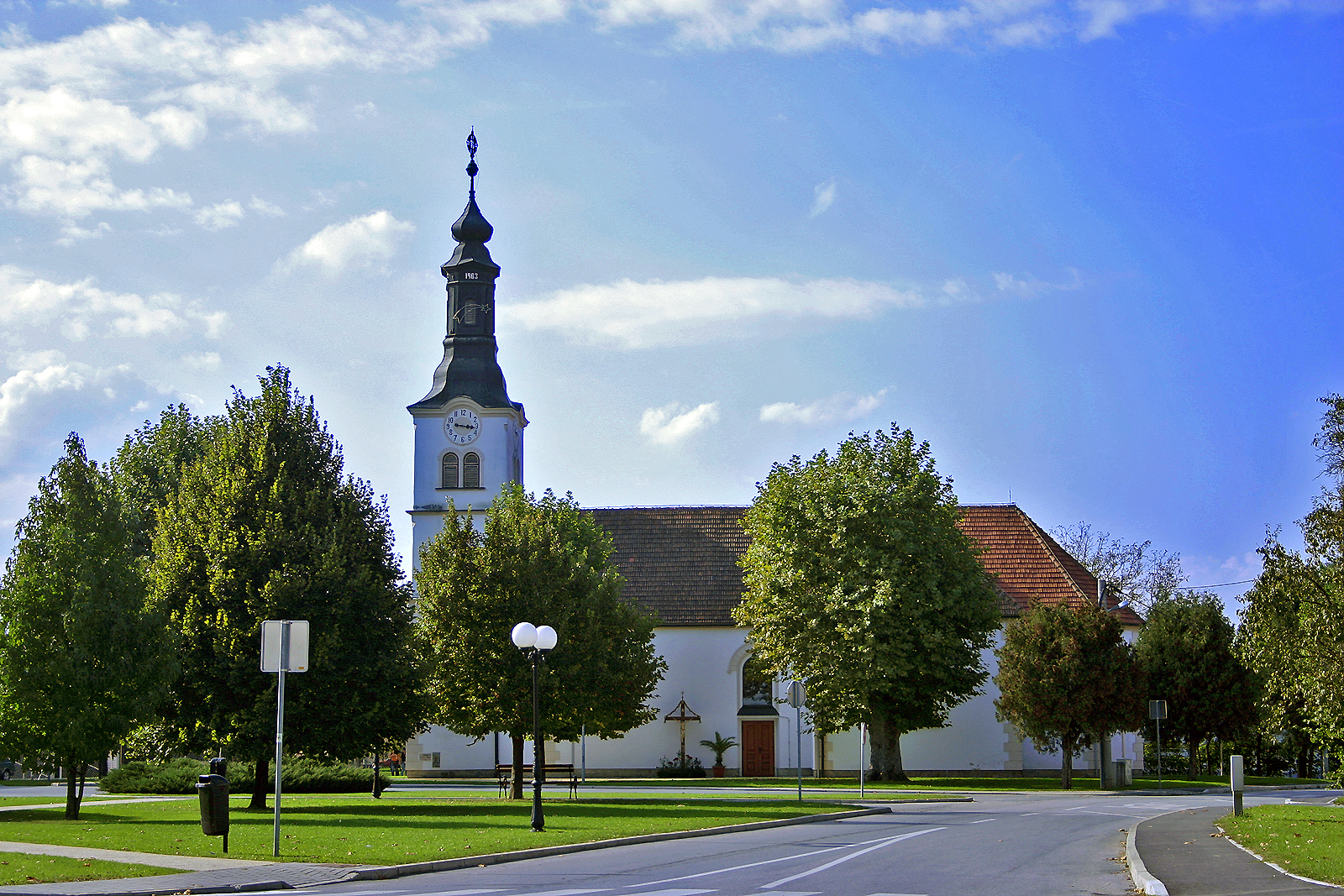

- Location in Slovenia
- Coordinates: 46°43′9.39″N 16°1′4.36″E
- Country: Slovenia
- Traditional region: Prekmurje
- Statistical region: Mura
- Municipality: Cankova

Area
  - Total: 3.46 km^{2} (1.34 sq mi)
- Elevation: 215.1 m (706 ft)

Population (2020)
  - Total: 416
  - Density: 120/km^{2} (311/sq mi)
- Postal code: 9261 Cankova

Cankova (pronounced [ˈtsaːŋkɔʋa]; Hungarian: Vashidegkút, German: Kaltenbrunn) is a village in the Prekmurje region of Slovenia. It is the seat of the Municipality of Cankova.

== Name ==
Cankova was attested in historical sources as Kaltenprun sive Hydeghuth in 1366 and Hydegkwth in 1499. The Slovenian name is a clipped form of *Cankova ves 'Can(e)k's village', referring to an early person associated with the place. The German name Kaltenbrunn literally means 'cold well', and the Hungarian name Vashidegkút literally means 'cold well in Vas County'.

== Church ==
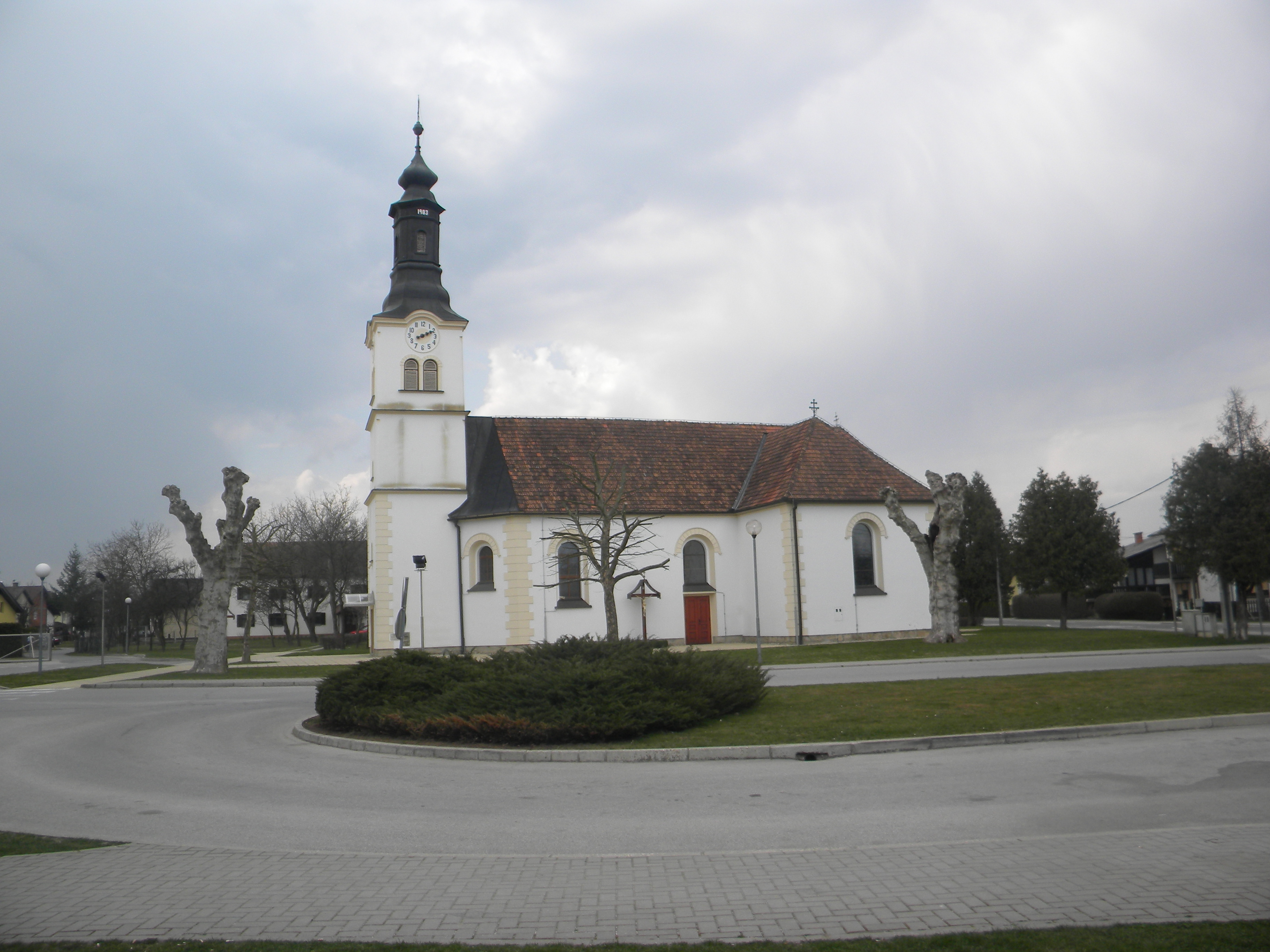
Exterior

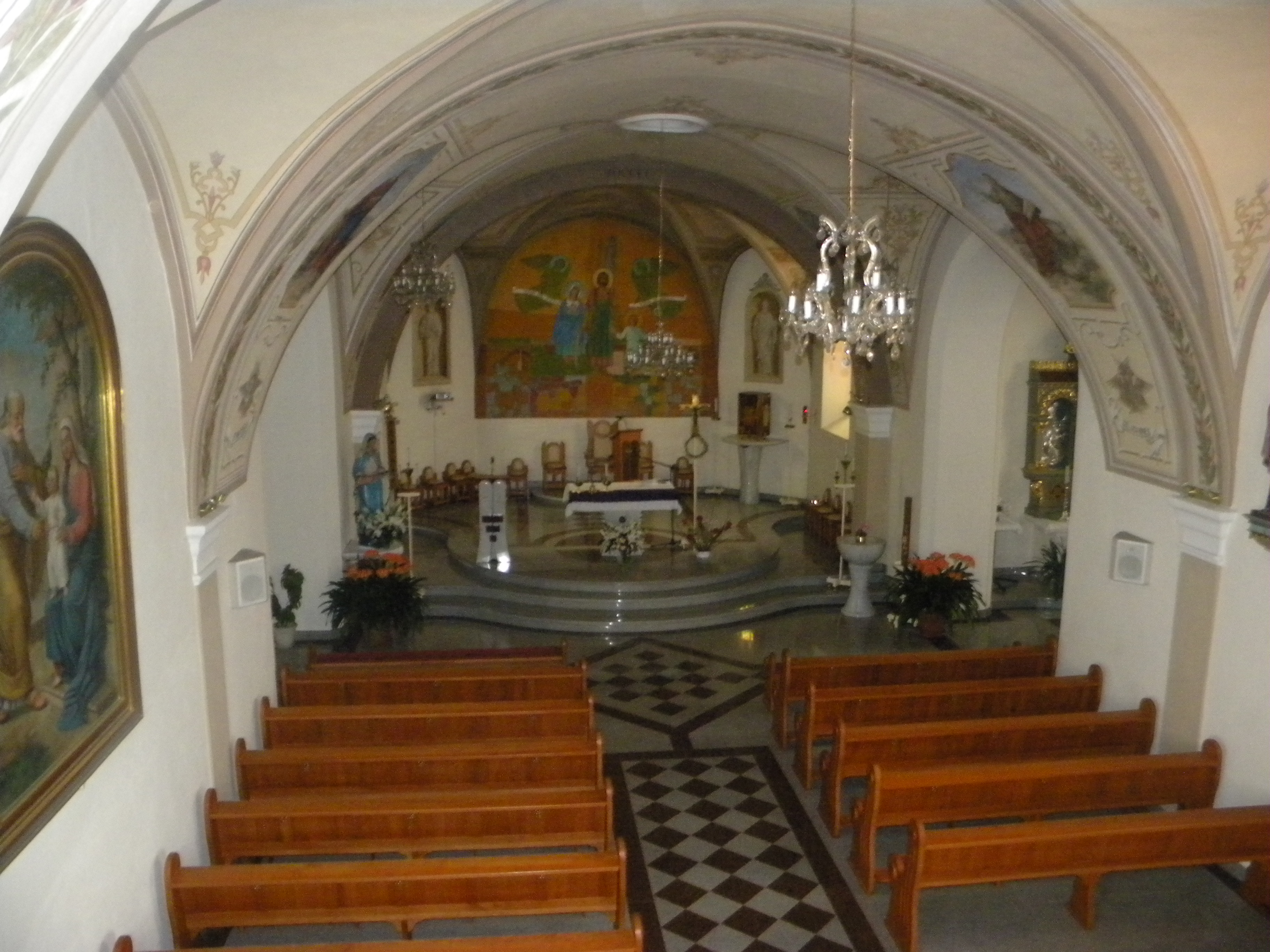
Interior

Saint Joseph's Church in Cankova

The parish church in Cankova is dedicated to Saint Joseph and belongs to the Roman Catholic Diocese of Murska Sobota. It was built in 1754 and renovated in 1900. It has a cruciform plan with a western belfry.

== Notable people ==
Notable people that were born or lived in Cankova include:

- Ágoston Pável (1886–1946), writer. The house he was born in was renovated in 1998 and houses an exhibition about the writer.
- Branko Pintarič (1967–), actor and writer
- Antal Stevanecz (1861–1921), teacher and writer
