= Gerlinci =

Gerlinci Göronci
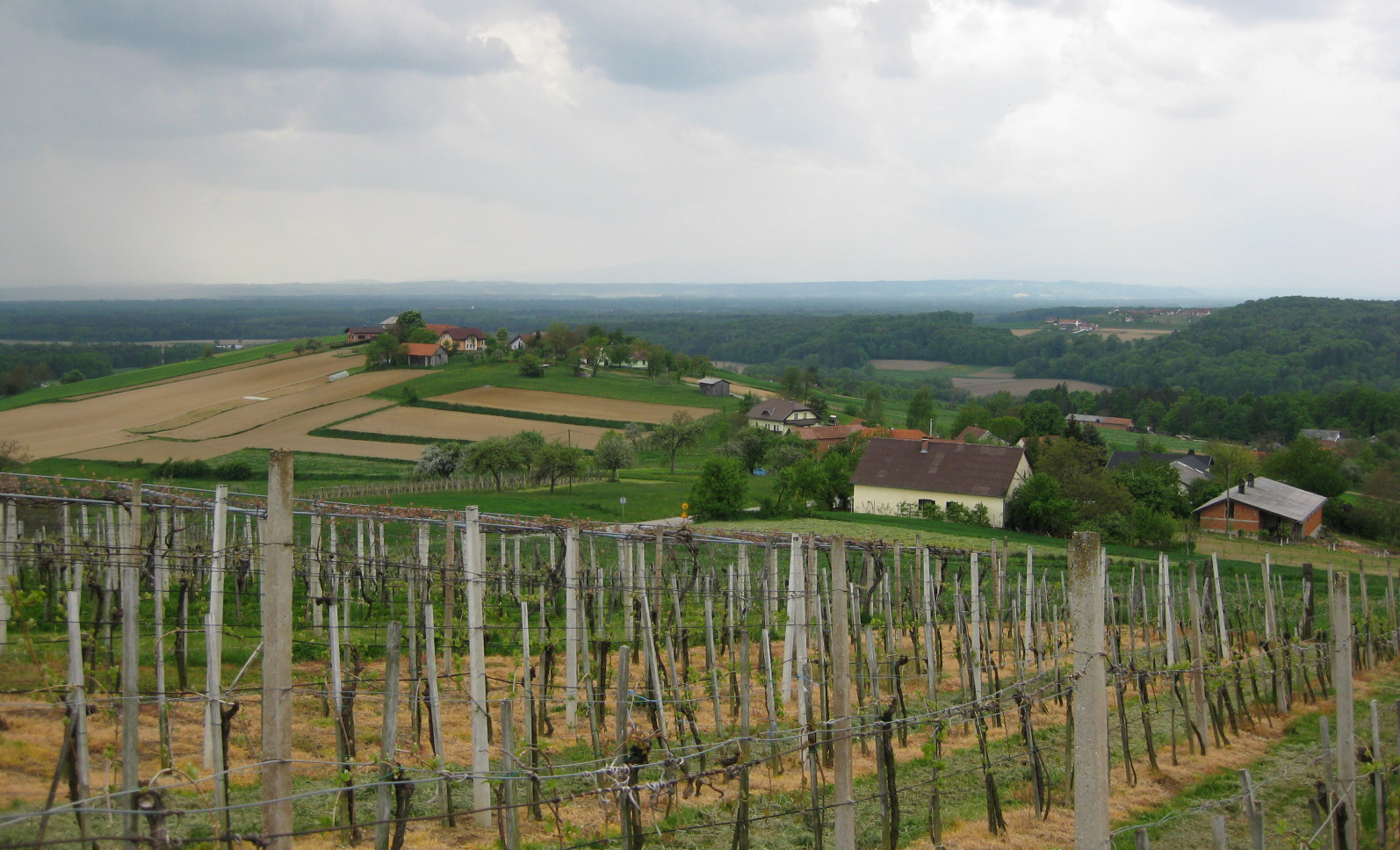

- Location in Slovenia
- Coordinates: 46°45′55.33″N 16°0′14.23″E
- Country: Slovenia
- Traditional region: Prekmurje
- Statistical region: Mura
- Municipality: Cankova

Area
  - Total: 5.7 km^{2} (2.2 sq mi)
- Elevation: 342.5 m (1,124 ft)

Population (2020)
  - Total: 311
  - Density: 55/km^{2} (140/sq mi)

Gerlinci (pronounced [ˈɡeːɾlintsi]; Hungarian: Görhegy, Prekmurje Slovene: Göronci) is a village in the Municipality of Cankova in the Prekmurje region of northeastern Slovenia.

There is a small chapel in the settlement. It was built in 1861 and is dedicated to Saint Anthony of Padua. It belongs to the Parish of Pertoča.
