= Municipality of Tišina =

Municipality of Slovenia

Municipality of Tišina Občina Tišina
- Municipality
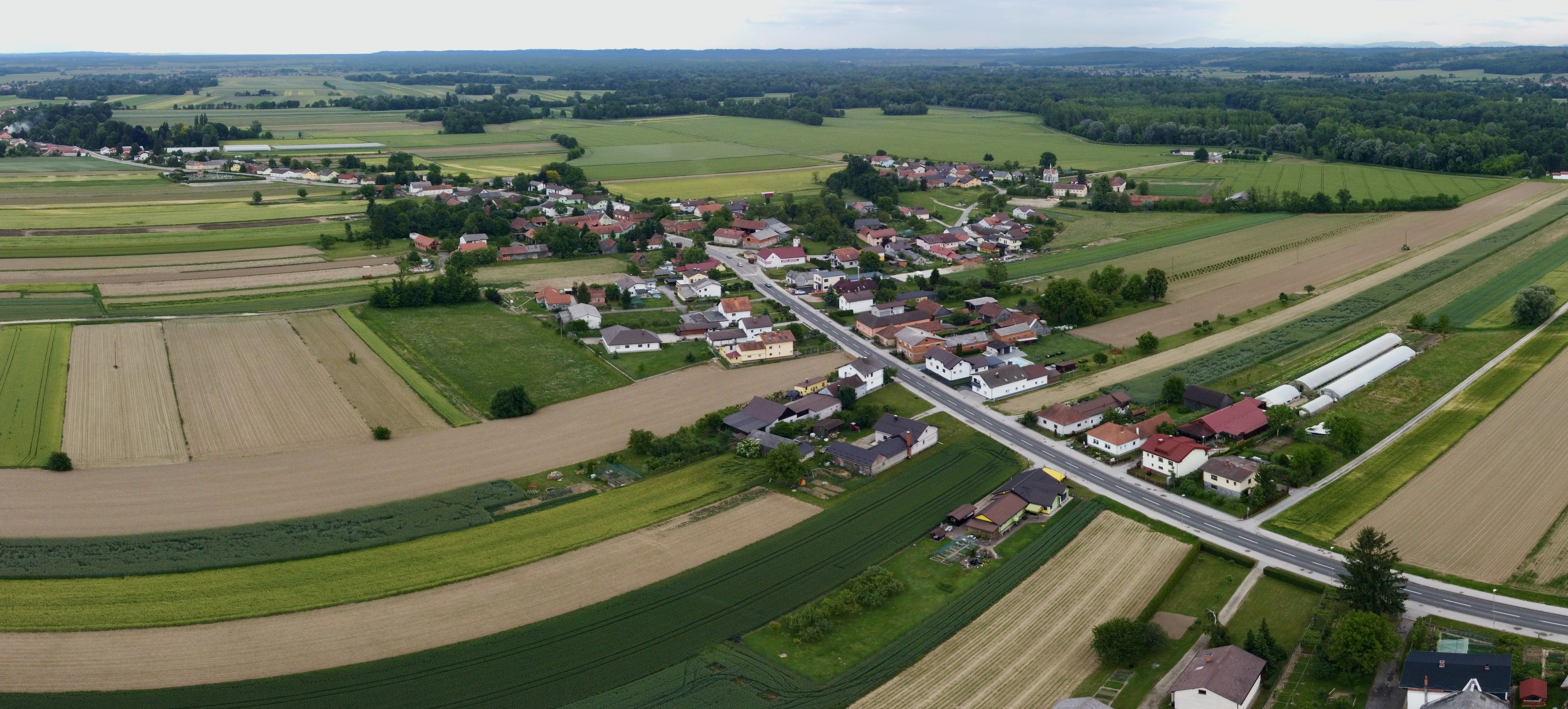

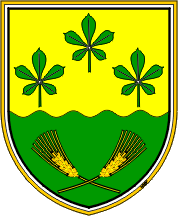
- Coat of arms

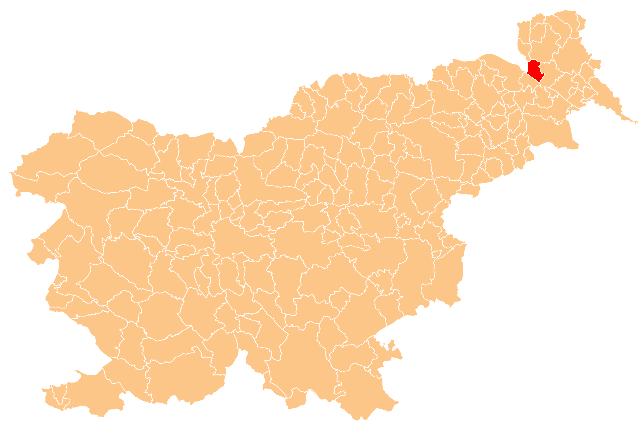
- Location of the Municipality of Tišina in Slovenia
- Coordinates: 46°40′N 16°05′E
- Country: Slovenia

Government
  - Mayor: Franc Horvat

Area
  - Total: 38.8 km^{2} (15.0 sq mi)

Population (July 1, 2018)
  - Total: 3,961
  - Density: 102/km^{2} (264/sq mi)
- Time zone: UTC+01 (CET)
  - Summer (DST): UTC+02 (CEST)
- Website: www.tisina.si

The Municipality of Tišina (pronounced [ˈtiːʃina]; Slovene: Občina Tišina) is a municipality in the traditional region of Prekmurje in northeastern Slovenia. The seat of the municipality is the town of Tišina. Tišina became a municipality in 1994. It borders Austria.

== Settlements ==
In addition to the municipal seat of Tišina, the municipality also includes the following settlements:

- Borejci
- Gederovci
- Gradišče
- Krajina
- Murski Črnci
- Murski Petrovci
- Petanjci
- Rankovci
- Sodišinci
- Tropovci
- Vanča Vas
