= Alsószölnök =

Alsószölnök Dolnji Senik
- Flag Coat of arms

- Location of Vas county in Hungary
- Interactive map of Alsószölnök; Dolnji Senik
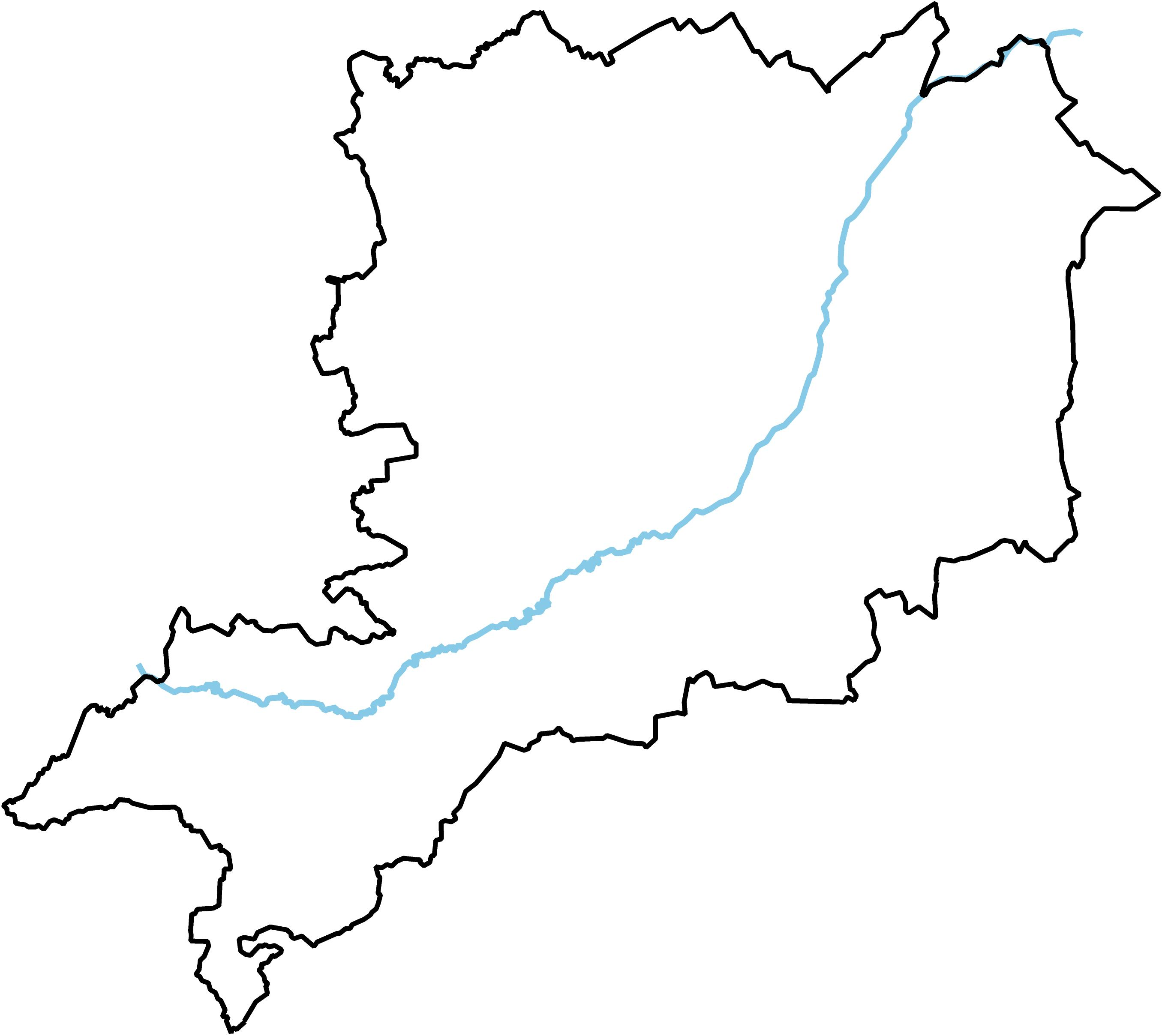
- Location of Alsószölnök Alsószölnök; Dolnji Senik (Hungary)
- Coordinates: 46.92746°N 16.20254°E
- Country: Hungary
- County: Vas

Area
  - Total: 10.02 km^{2} (3.87 sq mi)

Population (2015)
  - Total: 368
  - Density: 36.7/km^{2} (95.1/sq mi)
- Time zone: UTC+1 (CET)
  - Summer (DST): UTC+2 (CEST)
- Postal code: 9746
- Area code: 94

Alsószölnök (German: Unterzemming, Slovene: Dolnji Senik, Latin: Zelnuk Inferior) is a village in Vas County, Hungary. Until 1945 it had a German majority.

== Notable people ==
- Jožef Košič - József Kossics (1788–1867), Slovenian writer
- Jožef Sakovič - József Szakovics (1874–1930), Slovenian Roman Catholic priest
