= Tišina, Slovenia =

Tišina
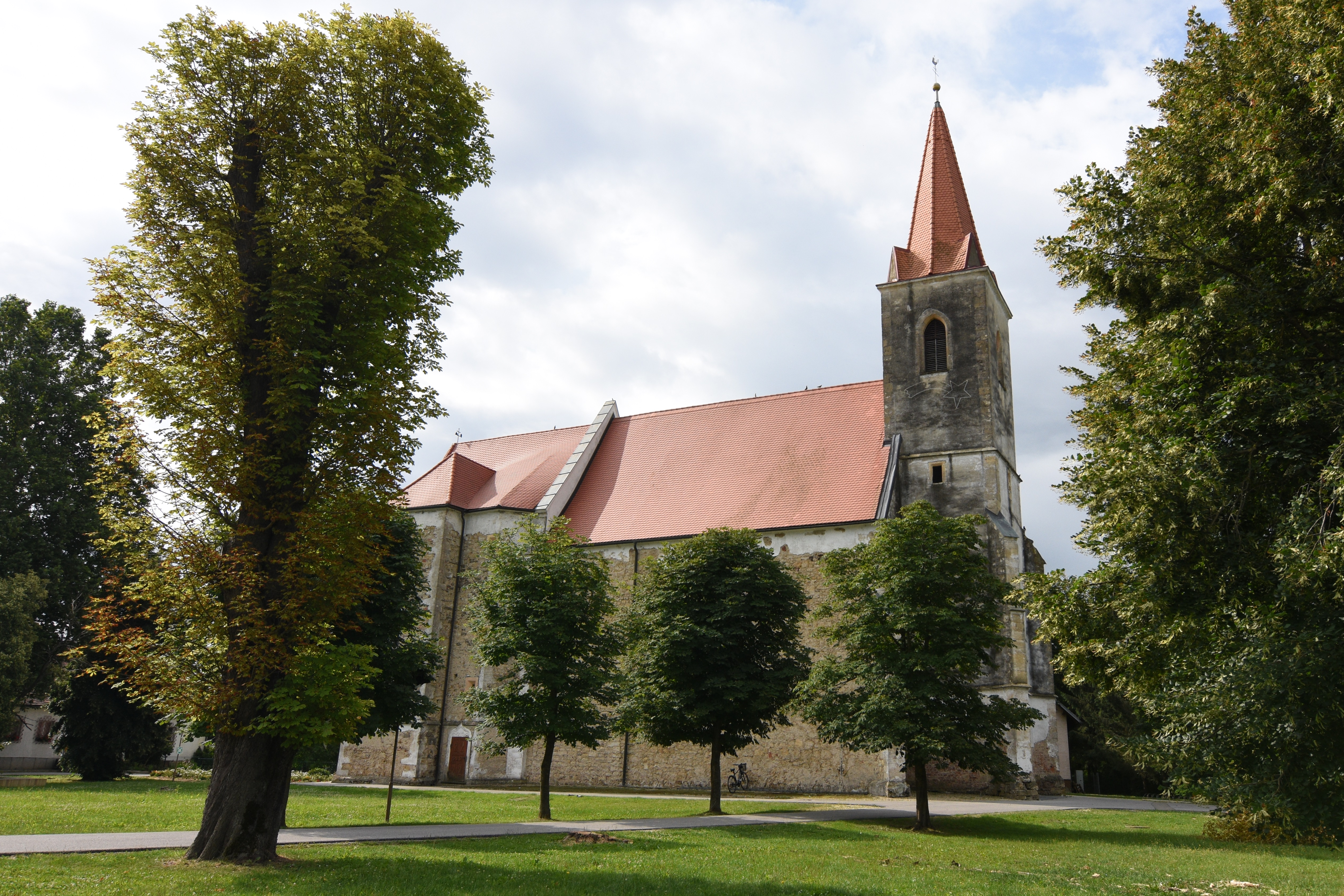
- Chapel-shrine in Tišina

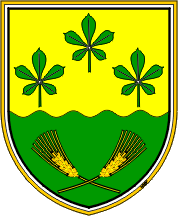
- Coat of arms

- Location in Slovenia
- Coordinates: 46°39′21″N 16°5′36″E
- Country: Slovenia
- Traditional region: Prekmurje
- Statistical region: Mura
- Municipality: Tišina

Area
  - Total: 2.65 km^{2} (1.02 sq mi)
- Elevation: 195.5 m (641 ft)

Population (2019)
  - Total: 412

Tišina (pronounced [ˈtiːʃina]; Hungarian: Csendlak) is a town in the Prekmurje region of northeastern Slovenia. It is the seat of the Municipality of Tišina. The parish church in the settlement is dedicated to the Nativity of Mary and belongs to the Roman Catholic Diocese of Murska Sobota. It dates to the 12th century with extensive 16th-century rebuilding.

== Notable people ==
- Ferenc Ivanóczy (1857–1913), Slovene priest and politician in Hungary
- Simon Špilak (born 1986), cyclist
