= Languages of Slovenia =

- Most spoken languages in Slovenia (Census 2002)
- Official: Slovene (Note: Italian and Hungarian are recognised as official languages in the residential areas of the Italian or Hungarian national community.)
- Minority: Hungarian, Italian, Romani, Croatian, Serbian, German
- Immigrant: Croatian, Serbian, Romani
- Foreign: Croatian, Serbian, English, German, Italian
- Signed: Slovenian Sign Language
- Keyboard layout: Slovene QWERTZ

Slovenia has been a meeting area of the Slavic, Germanic, Romance, and Uralic linguistic and cultural regions, which makes it one of the most complex meeting points of languages in Europe. The official and national language of Slovenia is Slovene, which is spoken by a large majority of the population. It is also known, in English, as Slovenian. Two minority languages, namely Hungarian and Italian, are recognised as co-official languages and accordingly protected in their residential municipalities. Other significant languages are Croatian and its variants and Serbian, spoken by most immigrants from other countries of former Yugoslavia and their descendants. Slovenia is ranked among the top European countries regarding the knowledge of foreign languages. The most often taught foreign languages are English and German, followed by Italian, French, and Spanish.

The population of Slovenia has become more diverse in regard to its language through recent decades but is still relatively homogenous — Slovene was in 2002 the first language of 87.8% of the inhabitants. It was followed by Croatian (2.8%), Serbian (1.6%) and Serbo-Croatian (1.6%). The Italian and Hungarian languages are protected by the Constitution of Slovenia, but have lower numbers of native speakers.

== Slovene ==
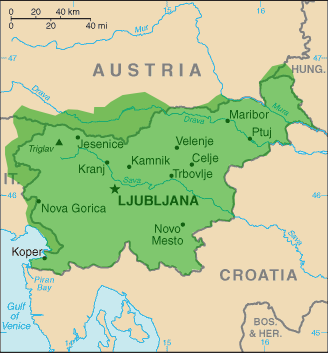
Areas where Slovene is spoken

In its Article 11, the Constitution of Slovenia stipulates that Slovene is to be the sole official and national language throughout the country. The Public Use of the Slovene Language Act of 2004 further defines the legal status of Slovene, by mandating that national and local authorities are compelled to use it in communication and legislation. As a national language, it is used on the obverse side of Slovenian euro coins, in the Slovenian national anthem, by The Slovenian President, and uniquely represents Slovene culture on the international stage.

Television and radio broadcasts, newspapers, commercials, user manuals, and other printed or broadcast material must be in Slovene. Usage of material in another language is permitted, if it is accordingly subtitled, dubbed or translated. Publishing or broadcasting untranslated material, as well as selling goods without instructions and declaration in Slovene, is punishable and banned by law. Also, names of corporations and trademarks registered in Slovenia must be in Slovene; however, they may be used along with the translated name in another language if its aimed at foreign markets.

Slovene is the language of instruction at all levels of schooling, from primary to tertiary education. There is an international high school in Ljubljana with English as the language of instruction, but it admits only students from foreign diplomats and Slovenes who had been schooled abroad for several years. University programs are offered in Slovene but a subset are also offered in foreign languages such as English.

The Centre for Slovene as a Second/Foreign Language encourages the learning of Slovene as foreign language, offers different courses in Slovene, and grants certificates of language proficiency. One may sit for the Slovene Language Exam at three levels: Basic, Intermediate and Advanced. After having passed the exam, the applicant receives the certificate of knowledge of the Slovene language, issued by the Faculty of Arts of University of Ljubljana, which is valid throughout the European Union, and makes the holder eligible to apply to any school or university in Slovenia.

With the accession of Slovenia to the European Union on May 1, 2004, Slovene became an official language of the European Union, requiring that all Acts and Directives be translated into Slovene. Additionally, Slovenian citizens may write to any EU institution in Slovene and expect a response in the same language.

=== Dialects ===
Slovene is divided into seven regional dialectal groups, further subdivided into local dialects. Mutual comprehension between certain dialects is limited.

==== Prekmurje Slovene ====
This is the only Slovene dialect that has ever been attempted to be declared an official language in the Prekmurje region. It has a limited standardized written form, has been used in the liturgy, and has been used in modern literature, music, television and film.

== Ethnic minority languages ==
=== Italian ===
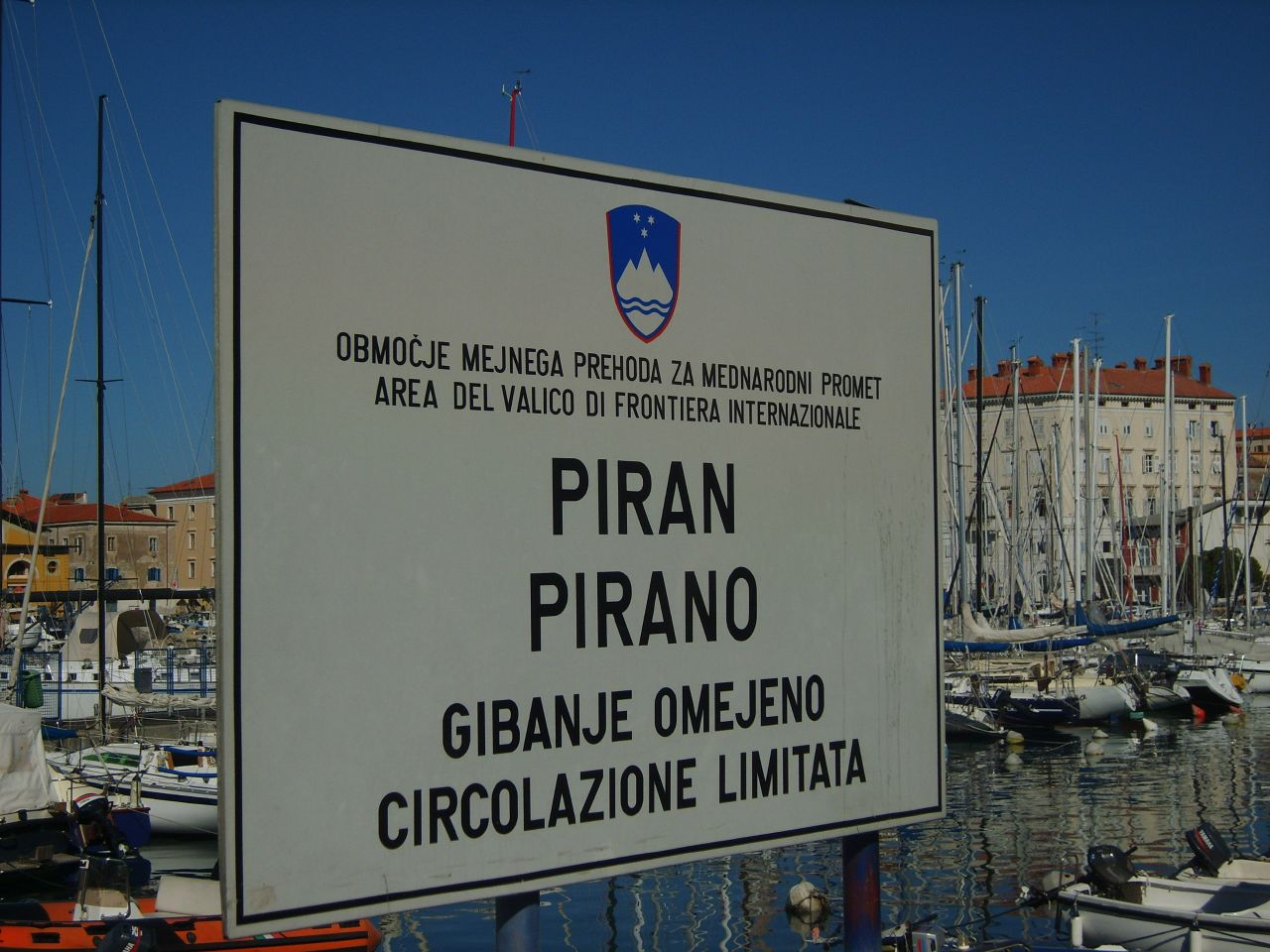
Bilingual Slovene-Italian sign in Piran.

The Italian language is an officially recognized minority language in Slovenia. Around 3,700 Slovenian citizens speak Italian as their mother tongue, mostly Istrian Italians. Their numbers drastically decreased following the Istrian–Dalmatian exodus (1943–1960).

Italian is officially recognised as the mother tongue of the protected Italian minority and co-official language in Slovenian Istria near the Slovenian-Italian border and at the Slovenian coastline. Public usage of Italian is permitted and protected by minority protection laws. Members of the Italian minority are entitled to primary and secondary education in their native language, as well as to radio and television programmes in Italian, and to communicating in Italian with the authorities.

Italian is co-official with Slovene in 25 settlements in 4 municipalities (all of them officially bilingual):

- Municipality of Ankaran (Občina Ankaran, ital. Comune di Ancarano)
  - Ankaran, ital. Ancarano
- Municipality of Izola (Občina Izola, ital. Comune di Isola)
  - Dobrava, ital. Dobrava presso Isola
  - Izola, ital. Isola
  - Jagodje, ital. Valleggia
- Urban municipality of Koper (Mestna občina Koper, ital. Città di Capodistria)
  - Barizoni, ital. Barisoni
  - Bertoki, ital. Bertocchi
  - Bošamarin, ital. Bossamarin
  - Cerej, ital. Cerei
  - Hrvatini, ital. Crevatini
  - Kampel, ital. Campel
  - Kolomban, ital. Colombano
  - Koper, ital. Capodistria
  - Prade, ital. Prade
  - Premančan, ital. Premanzano
  - Spodnje Škofije, ital. Valmarin
  - Šalara, ital. Salara
  - Škocjan, ital. San Canziano
- Municipality of Piran (Občina Piran, ital. Comune di Pirano)
  - Dragonja, ital. Dragogna
  - Lucija, ital. Lucia
  - Parecag, ital. Parezzago
  - Piran, ital. Pirano
  - Portorož, ital. Portorose
  - Seča, ital. Sezza
  - Sečovlje, ital. Sicciole
  - Strunjan, ital. Strugnano

=== Hungarian ===
Hungarian is officially recognised as the mother tongue of protected Hungarian minority in Prekmurje region near the Slovenian-Hungarian border. Public usage of Hungarian is permitted and protected by minority protection laws. Members of Hungarian minority are entitled to primary and secondary education in their native language, as well to radio and occasional television broadcast in Hungarian, and to communicating in Hungarian with the authorities.

Hungarian is co-official with Slovene in 30 settlements in 5 municipalities (whereof 3 are officially bilingual):

- Municipality of Dobrovnik (Občina Dobrovnik, hung. Dobronak Község)
  - Dobrovnik, hung. Dobronak
  - Žitkovci, hung. Zsitkóc
- Municipality of Hodoš (Občina Hodoš, hung. Őrihodos Község)
  - Hodoš, hung. Őrihodos
  - Krplivnik, hung. Kapornak
- Municipality of Lendava (Občina Lendava, hung. Lendva Község)
  - Banuta, hung. Bánuta
  - Čentiba, hung. Csente
  - Dolga vas, hung. Hosszúfalu
  - Dolgovaške Gorice, hung. Hosszúfaluhegy
  - Dolina pri Lendavi, hung. Völgyifalu
  - Dolnji Lakoš, hung. Alsólakos
  - Gaberje, hung. Gyertyános
  - Genterovci, hung. Göntérháza
  - Gornji Lakoš, hung. Felsőlakos
  - Kamovci, hung. Kámaháza
  - Kapca, hung. Kapca
  - Kot, hung. Kót
  - Lendava, hung. Lendva
  - Lendavske Gorice, hung. Lendvahegy
  - Mostje, hung. Hídvég
  - Petišovci, hung. Petesháza
  - Pince, hung. Pince
  - Pince-Marof, hung. Pincemajor
  - Radmožanci, hung. Radamos
  - Trimlini, hung. Hármasmalom
- Municipality of Moravske Toplice (Občina Moravske Toplice)
  - Čikečka vas, hung. Csekefa
  - Motvarjevci, hung. Szécsiszentlászló
  - Pordašinci, hung. Kisfalu
  - Prosenjakovci, hung. Pártosfalva
  - Središče, hung. Szerdahely
- Municipality of Šalovci (Občina Šalovci)
  - Domanjševci, hung. Domonkosfa

=== South Slavic languages and Albanian ===
A significant number of Slovenian population speak a variant of Croatian and Serbian as their native language. These are mostly immigrants who moved to Slovenia from other former Yugoslav republics from the 1960s to the late 1980s, and their descendants. 0.4% of the Slovenian population declared themselves as native speakers of Albanian and 0.2% as native speakers of Macedonian in 2002.

There is a small Croatian speaking community in White Carniola, whose existence predates Yugoslavia. In four villages (Miliči, Bojanci, Marindol and Paunoviči), people speak the Eastern Herzegovinian dialect, with a strong influence of Slovene. People living there are mainly Serbian Orthodox and descendants of Serbian Uskoks, guerilla warriors against Ottoman invasions.

In its sixth evaluation report on Slovenia's implementation of the European Charter for Regional or Minority Languages, the Council of Europe urged the country once again to recognise Serbian and Croatian as traditional minority languages. The 2025 call followed earlier recommendations made in 2014, 2019 and 2021.

== Romani ==
Romani, spoken in 2002 as the native language by 0.2% of people, is a legally protected language in Slovenia. These people mainly belong to the geographically dispersed and marginalized Roma community.

== German ==
German and Bavarian dialects have been autochthonous since present-day Slovenia came under the rule of Bavaria in the 8th century. Whereas many immigrants from German-speaking areas adopted Slovene over the centuries, others retained their language. Until the 20th century, the most numerous German-speaking communities were found in the urban centers of Lower Styria, in the Gottschee County in southern Slovenia and in the villages around Apače (Apaško polje) along the Mura river.

According to the last Austrian census of 1910, around 9% of the population of present-day Slovenia spoke German as their native tongue. Towns with a German-speaking majority included Maribor, Celje, Ptuj, Kočevje, Slovenj Gradec, Slovenska Bistrica, Ormož, Dravograd and some other smaller towns.

After World War I, the number of German-speakers dropped significantly: most of the towns were slovenized, and German remained the majority language only in the Gottschee County and around Apače. According to the last pre-WWII Yugoslav census, German speakers amounted to 2.5% of the overall population. Former German or bilingual speakers had switched to Slovene, the official language.

During World War II, ethnic Germans were resettled from areas occupied by Italy (Ljubljana, Gottschee) into the German-occupied zone. On the end and after the war, the great majority of the remaining Germans were expropriated (AVNOJ-Decree), expulsed or murdered by Yugoslav partisans. In the census of 2002, just 1,628 persons (0.1% of the population) declared German as their mother tongue. Almost everyone today born in Slovenia knows Slovene because people learn obligatory Slovene in school, but many at home speak other languages as well. The number of people fluent in German is unknown. German-speaking women around Maribor who are citizens of Slovenia have organized in the association Kulturno društvo nemško govorečih žena »Mostovi« Maribor ("Bridges").

=== Gottscheerish ===
Gottscheerish or Granish is a Bavarian dialect of the German language and has been spoken in the Gottschee County around Kočevje (Gottschee) since 1330. For over 600 years, it was the predominant oral language of the Gottscheers in that area, whereas Standard German was their written language. Most Gottschee Germans were resettled by the German occupation forces in 1941 during World War II. Only a few hundred Gottscheers remained, most of them supporting the partisan movement. After the war, Gottscheerish was forbidden. Today there are only a few speakers left, most of them in Moschnitze valley (Črmošnjiško-Poljanska dolina) between Kočevske Poljane and Črmošnjice, others today mainly know standard German.

=== Recognition ===
Gottscheerish and German, though autochthonous to Slovenia, have no official status and are not protected by law.

== Czech and Slovak ==
Czech and Slovak, which used to be the fourth largest minority language in Slovenia prior to World War II (after Italian, German, Hungarian, Croatian and Serbian), is now the native languages of a few hundred Slovenian residents.

== Foreign languages ==
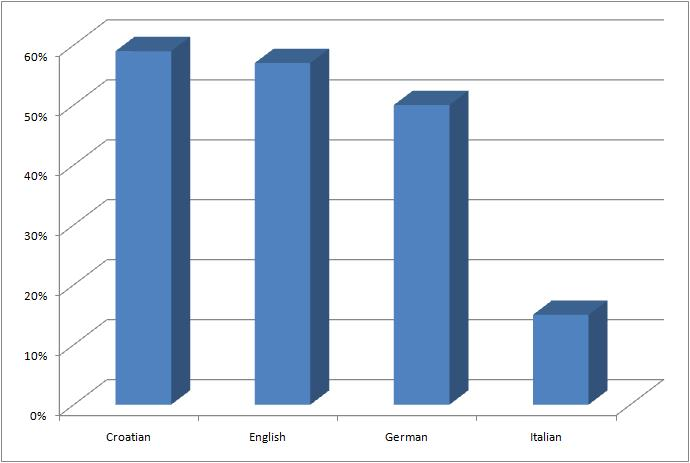
The most commonly known foreign languages in Slovenia in 2005. According to Eurostat.

Historically, German was the lingua franca of Central European space and was perceived as the language of commerce, science and literature in Slovenia. Consequently, German used to be the first foreign language taught in schools. With the formation of Yugoslavia, Serbo-Croatian became the language of federal authorities and the first foreign language taught in school. Slovenes pick up Serbo-Croatian more easily than other foreign languages due to its relative linguistic similarity to Slovene, as both form the South Slavic dialect continuum.

Nowadays, English has superseded it and is taught as the first foreign language throughout the country from pre-school onwards. German has, however, retained its strong position as an important language and is the most common second foreign language in high schools. According to Eurostat, Slovenia has the highest competence in German of any non-Germanic country, with only Luxembourg, the Netherlands, and Denmark being higher. Other second foreign languages are Italian, Spanish, French and Hungarian. Among the five subjects in the Slovenian finishing exam (Matura), one foreign language—most commonly English—is compulsory.

As a consequence of different foreign languages having been taught at different times, there is no prevailing foreign language knowledge in Slovenia. Younger generations speak English and Serbo-Croatian well enough to communicate, whereas elder generations generally speak Serbo-Croatian and German better. There are also regional differences, especially among the knowledge of a second foreign language, with German being more frequently taught and used in Styria region, whereas residents of the Littoral region have better familiarity with Italian. In Prekmurje region, Prekmurje dialect sees a degree of mixing with Kajkavian Croatian, while in Gorizia on the border with Italy, Littoral Slovene dialects see Italian, Venetian and Friulian influence.
