= Hungary–Slovenia border =

The border between Hungary and Slovenia starts in the North at the tripoint with Austria near Felsőszölnök and continues southward until it reaches the tripoint with Croatia at Pince–Marof. The current border was created as a result of World War I in 1920 with the Treaty of Trianon. Prior to that, the border between the Austrian Duchy of Styria, which included the currently Slovenian region of Slovenian Styria and the Kingdom of Hungary ran further west along Mur river.

== Border crossings ==
There are currently 15 open road land crossings between the two countries, 1 of which is a railway crossing. Following the entry of Slovenia and Hungary into the Schengen Area, regular border checks have been suspended. The border can be crossed at any place by EU/EEA/Swiss citzizens, provided one does not violate civil property rights. Other citizens may be restricted to crossing at Bajánsenye/Hodoš or Tornyiszentmiklós/Pince.

The following is a table of cross-border road and rail crossing points, listed from North to South:

(Hungary) Hungarian name	County	(Slovenia) Slovenian name	Municipality	Route in Hungary	Route in Slovenia
Felsőszölnök	Vas	Martinje	Gornji Petrovci	local road	local road
Kétvölgy	Vas	Čepinci	Šalovci	local road	723
Orfalu	Vas	Budinci	Šalovci	local road	local road
Bajánsenye	Vas	Hodoš	Hodoš	railway	railway
Bajánsenye	Vas	Hodoš	Hodoš	local road	232
Kercaszomor	Vas	Domanjševci	Šalovci	local road	724
Magyarszombatfa	Vas	Prosenjakovci	Moravske Toplice	local road	725
Szentgyörgyvölgy	Zala	Kobilje	Kobilje	local road	439
Bödeháza	Zala	Žitkovci	Dobrovnik	local road	local road
Gáborjánháza	Zala	Genterovci	Lendava	local road	local road
Rédics 1	Zala	Mostje	Lendava	local road	local road
Rédics 2	Zala	Dolga Vas	Lendava		
Felsőtenke	Zala	Lendavske Gorice	Lendava	local road	local road
Tornyiszentmiklós 1	Zala	Pince 1	Lendava	local road	443
Tornyiszentmiklós 2	Zala	Pince 2	Lendava		

== See also ==
- Hungarian border barrier
- Hungary–Slovenia relations
