= Črnec (Ledava) =

Location
- Country: Slovenia

Physical characteristics
- Mouth
  - location: Ledava
  - coordinates: 46°32′20″N 16°28′26″E

Basin features
- Progression: Ledava→ Mur→ Drava→ Danube→ Black Sea

Črnec Creek is a stream of Slovenia. It is a left tributary of the Ledava near Čentiba.

It has its source south of Murska Sobota and flows southeastward. It is joined by Dobel Creek between Beltinci and Odranci, flows past the village of Odranci, and is then joined by Black Creek (Črni potok) north of Kapca. After passing southwest of Lendava, it flows parallel to the Ledava River before emptying into the Ledava southwest of Čentiba. The stream is about 26 kilometers (16 mi) long.

The name Črnec means 'the black one'. The creek was attested in historical documents in 1244 as Cernech, and in Hungarian in the 20th century as Csernec patak. Like similar names of streams (e.g., Črna and Črni potok), the semantic motivation for the name is a creek that flows through a dark soil (i.e., non-gravel) bed or that carries dark, turbid water.

== See also ==
- List of rivers of Slovenia
