= Lakos =

Lakos is a surname. Notable people with the surname include:

- André Lakos (born 1979), Austrian ice hockey defenceman
- Gyöngyvér Lakos (born 1977), Hungarian freestyle swimmer
- László Lakos (born 1945), Hungarian veterinarian and former politician
- Nikoletta Lakos (born 1978), Hungarian chess woman grandmaster
- Philippe Lakos (born 1980), Austrian ice hockey defenceman

See also

- Dolnji Lakoš, is a village southwest of Lendava in the Prekmurje region of Slovenia
- Gornji Lakoš, is a village southwest of Lendava in the Prekmurje region of Slovenia
