= Szomoróc uprising =

- Part of Revolutions and interventions in Hungary
Date	1 August 1920
Location	Szomoróc (today Kercaszomor), Hungarian–Slovenian border 46.78810°N 16.34396°E
Result	Serb, Croat and Slovene victory: Uprising suppressed; See Aftermath
Territorial changes	Szomoróc temporarily incorporated into the Kingdom of Serbs, Croats and Slovenes

Belligerents
Kingdom of Serbs, Croats and Slovenes	(First Hungarian Republic) Hungarian rebels

Commanders and leaders
Dragutin Perko	József Rankay (surrendered)

Strength
Unknown	17 border guards

The Szomoróc uprising (Note: In Hungarian: Szomoróc felkelés; in Serbian: Somoročki ustanak (Cyrillic: Соморочки устанак); in Slovene: Szomoróc vstaja.) was an uprising led by József Rankay in Szomoróc (today Kercaszomor) against the authorities of the Kingdom of Serbs, Croats and Slovenes, who previously invaded the region on 12 August 1919.

== Uprising ==
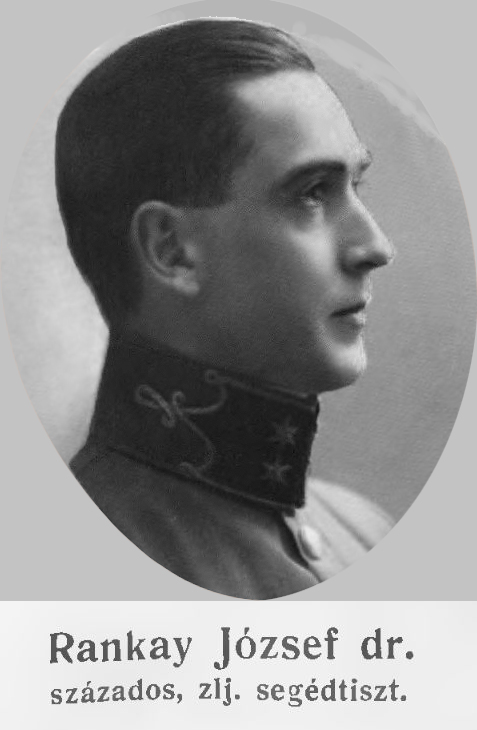
Portrait of Lieutenant József Rankay.

On 12 August 1919, in violation of the demarcation line defined by the Entente, Szomoróc was invaded by the troops of the Kingdom of Serbs, Croats and Slovenes, like what happened in Međimurje and Prekmurje. At that time, the population of the village was Hungarian, and uniformly of the Reformed religion.

On 1 August 1920, the local population rebelled and confronted the invaders with weapons. The uprising started at 11 PM under the leadership of Lieutenant József Rankay, the head of the border guard branch stationed in the village of Kerc; with the participation of 17 border guards and the male residents of Kerc and Szomoróc who joined them. The invaders were chased to Domanjševci. The weapons needed for the fight were provided by József Rankay from the border guard's inventory. The occupying soldiers fleeing from Szomoróc fired with their weapons, and the insurgents from Szomorócz did as well. However, the rebels were several times outnumbered, so the uprising was put down within hours, and Szomoróc came under Serb, Croat and Slovene rule, and the border guards and the insurgents were pushed back to Kerc.

According to a contemporary report, the citizens of Szomoróc who supported the rebellion were beaten and escorted to Muraszombat. Afterwards, they were locked up in the village jail overlooking the street, and were not given food for several days. Complaints from Muraszombati locals to the police commissioner led them to state that the prisoners did not deserve it and that their goal was to starve them to death. The audience turned to the guards guarding the mourners, who, motivated by a feeling of philanthropy, allowed them to feed them in secret.

== Aftermath ==
The names of the border guards and men from Kerc who also took part in the fighting have not survived or have not been found so far. Ultimately, the Boundary Establishment Committee decided that Szomoróc should be returned to Hungary. On February 8, 1922, the invaders withdrew, and on February 9, Szomoróc re-joined Hungary.
