= Benica =

- Location in Slovenia
- Coordinates: 46°30′43.18″N 16°30′20.91″E
- Country: Slovenia
- Traditional region: Prekmurje
- Statistical region: Mura
- Municipality: Lendava

Area
  - Total: 5.22 km^{2} (2.02 sq mi)
- Elevation: 155.3 m (510 ft)

Population (2002)
  - Total: 75

Benica (pronounced [bɛˈniːtsa] or [ˈbeːnitsa]; Hungarian: Benica) is a small settlement in the Municipality of Lendava in the Prekmurje region of Slovenia. It lies close to the extreme eastern tip of Slovenia, near the Mura River on the right bank of the Ardova Canal, close to the borders with Croatia and Hungary. Until the canal was built in 1910, the area occupied by the settlement was part of the Mura Woods (Slovene: Murska šuma), but then the area was cleared and in 1923 the Esterházy family's manorial possessions were taken away and transferred to settlers who were refugees from the Isonzo Front. Until the Second World War it was a hamlet of Pince.
