= Brezovec, Lendava =

Brezovec
- Location in Slovenia
- Coordinates: 46°32′39.61″N 16°20′37.36″E
- Country: Slovenia
- Traditional region: Prekmurje
- Statistical region: Mura
- Municipality: Lendava

Area
  - Total: 0.24 km^{2} (0.093 sq mi)
- Elevation: 166.4 m (546 ft)

Brezovec (pronounced [ˈbɾeːzɔʋəts]; Hungarian: Végfalva) is a former settlement in the Municipality of Lendava in the Prekmurje region of Slovenia. The main part of the settlement lies on the opposite bank of the Mura River close to Sveti Martin na Muri in Croatia. In 2022 it became part of the settlement of Hotiza.
