= Kamovci =

Kamovci Kámaháza
- Location in Slovenia
- Coordinates: 46°37′44.94″N 16°23′1.26″E
- Country: Slovenia
- Traditional region: Prekmurje
- Statistical region: Mura
- Municipality: Lendava

Area
  - Total: 1.8 km^{2} (0.69 sq mi)
- Elevation: 166.1 m (545 ft)

Population (2002)
  - Total: 113

Kamovci (pronounced [ˈkaːmɔu̯tsi]; Hungarian: Kámaháza) is a small village on the road from Dobrovnik to Lendava in the Prekmurje region of Slovenia, right on the border with Hungary.
