= Dolgovaške Gorice =

Dolgovaške Gorice Hosszúfaluhegy
- Location in Slovenia
- Coordinates: 46°34′27.18″N 16°28′1.51″E
- Country: Slovenia
- Traditional region: Prekmurje
- Statistical region: Mura
- Municipality: Lendava

Area
  - Total: 4.59 km^{2} (1.77 sq mi)
- Elevation: 266.6 m (875 ft)

Population (2002)
  - Total: 277

Dolgovaške Gorice (pronounced [dɔu̯ɡɔˈʋaːʃkɛ ɡɔˈɾiːtsɛ]; Hungarian: Hosszúfaluhegy) is a settlement in the hills east of Lendava in the Prekmurje region of Slovenia. It lies on the border with Hungary.
