= Markovci, Šalovci =

Markovci Marokrét
- Location in Slovenia
- Coordinates: 46°50′39.32″N 16°14′5.57″E
- Country: Slovenia
- Traditional region: Prekmurje
- Statistical region: Mura
- Municipality: Šalovci

Area
  - Total: 8.17 km^{2} (3.15 sq mi)
- Elevation: 310.2 m (1,018 ft)

Population (2002)
  - Total: 294

Markovci (pronounced [ˈmaːɾkɔu̯tsi]; Hungarian: Marokrét) is a village in the Municipality of Šalovci in the Prekmurje region of Slovenia.

The parish church west of the settlement is dedicated to the Visitation of the Virgin and belongs to the Roman Catholic Diocese of Murska Sobota. It was originally built in 1644 but totally rebuilt in 1884 after a fire destroyed the old church. Only the belfry remains of the original church.
