= Dolina pri Lendavi =

Dolina pri Lendavi Völgyifalu
- Location in Slovenia
- Coordinates: 46°32′8.06″N 16°30′19.5″E
- Country: Slovenia
- Traditional region: Prekmurje
- Statistical region: Mura
- Municipality: Lendava

Area
  - Total: 6.69 km^{2} (2.58 sq mi)
- Elevation: 163.3 m (536 ft)

Population (2002)
  - Total: 343

Dolina pri Lendavi (pronounced [ˈdoːlina pɾi ˈleːndaʋi]; Hungarian: Völgyifalu) is a settlement southeast of Lendava in the Prekmurje region of Slovenia. It lies close to the border with Hungary.

== Name ==
The name of the settlement was changed from Dolina to Dolina pri Lendavi in 1953.
