= Gaberje, Lendava =

Gaberje Gyertyános
- Location in Slovenia
- Coordinates: 46°32′52.47″N 16°24′38.69″E
- Country: Slovenia
- Traditional region: Prekmurje
- Statistical region: Mura
- Municipality: Lendava

Area
  - Total: 6.06 km^{2} (2.34 sq mi)
- Elevation: 162 m (531 ft)

Population (2002)
  - Total: 539

Gaberje (pronounced [ˈɡaːbɛɾjɛ]; Hungarian: Gyertyános) is a settlement southwest of Lendava in the Prekmurje region of Slovenia. It lies on the left bank of the Mura River, close to the border with Croatia.
