= Petišovci Stadium =

Motorcycle speedway stadium in Slovenia

- Interactive map of Petišovci Stadium
- Location: Rudarska ulica 60, 9220 Lendava, Slovenia
- Coordinates: 46°31′48″N 16°28′32″E
- Capacity: 7,000

Petišovci Stadium (Slovene: Stadion Petišovci) is a purpose-built motorcycle speedway stadium near Lendava in Slovenia. It is located east of Petišovci and approximately 5 kilometres south of Lendava, off the Rudarska ulica. The facility hosts the Športno Društvo Lendava team.

== History ==
The facility has been a significant venue for speedway and hosted many important events, including qualifying rounds of the Speedway World Championship, starting in 1981, when Slovenia was part of Yugoslavia.

The stadium continues to hold important events such as rounds of the 2009 Individual Speedway Junior European Championship and the 2010 Individual Speedway Junior World Championship.
