= Kot, Lendava =

Kot Kót
- Location in Slovenia
- Coordinates: 46°32′33.24″N 16°23′10.69″E
- Country: Slovenia
- Traditional region: Prekmurje
- Statistical region: Mura
- Municipality: Lendava

Area
  - Total: 1.19 km^{2} (0.46 sq mi)
- Elevation: 165 m (541 ft)

Population (2002)
  - Total: 136

Kot (pronounced [ˈkoːt]; Hungarian: Kót) is a small village south of Kapca in the Municipality of Lendava in the Prekmurje region of Slovenia. It lies on the left bank of the Mura River, on the border with Croatia.

The small church in the settlement is dedicated to Saint Anthony of Padua and belongs to the Parish of Lendava.
