= Hungary–Slovenia relations =

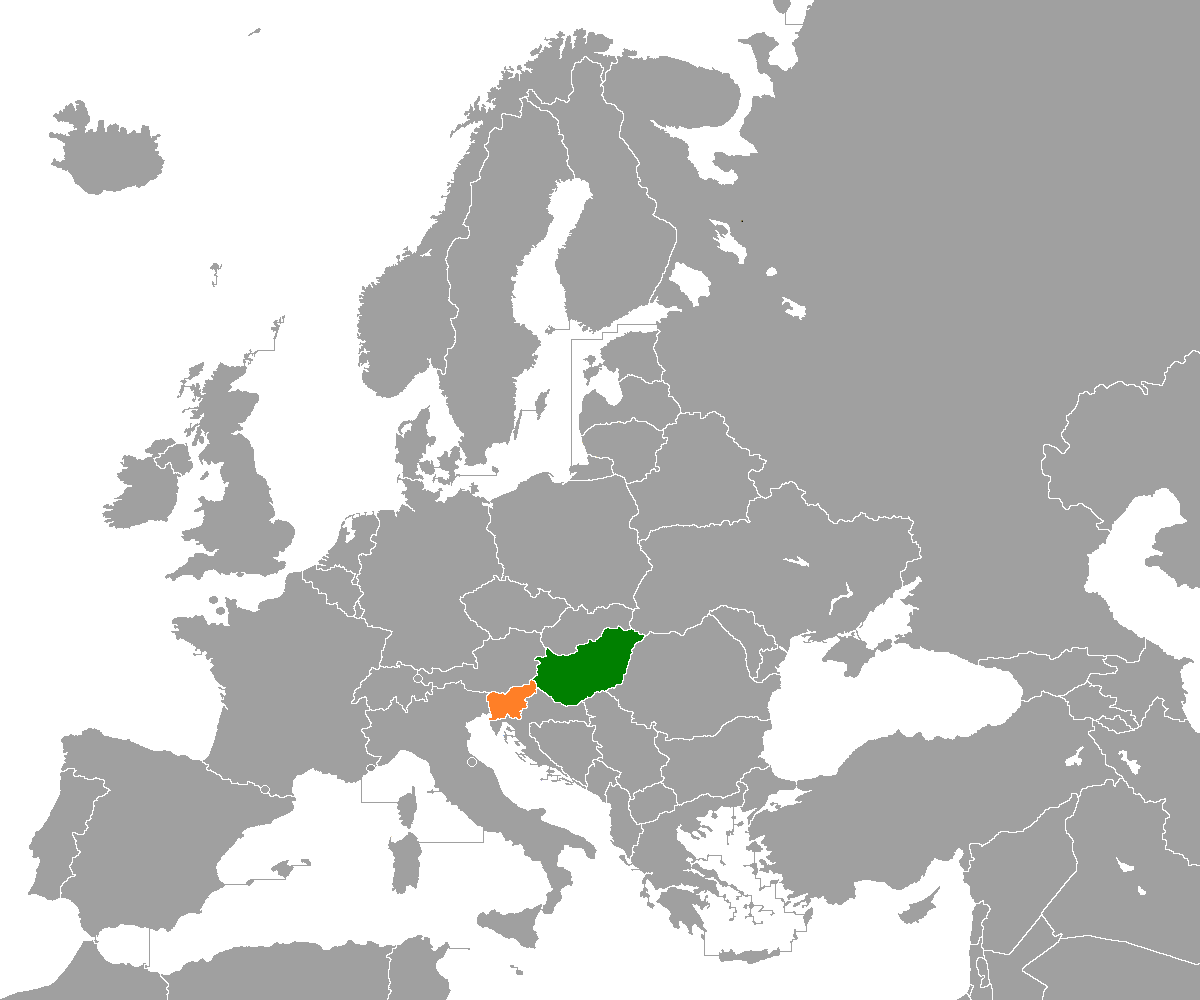

- Hungary: Slovenia

Hungary–Slovenia relations are the bilateral relations between Hungary and Slovenia. Hungary has an embassy in Ljubljana. Slovenia has an embassy in Budapest and a general consulate in Szentgotthárd.

The countries share 102 km of common border. Both countries are full members of the Council of Europe, European Union, NATO and Organization for Security and Co-operation in Europe.

== European Union and NATO ==
Both countries became members of the European Union in 2004. Hungary joined NATO in 1999, and Slovenia joined NATO in 2004.

== Resident diplomatic missions ==
- Hungary has an embassy in Ljubljana.
- Slovenia has an embassy in Budapest.
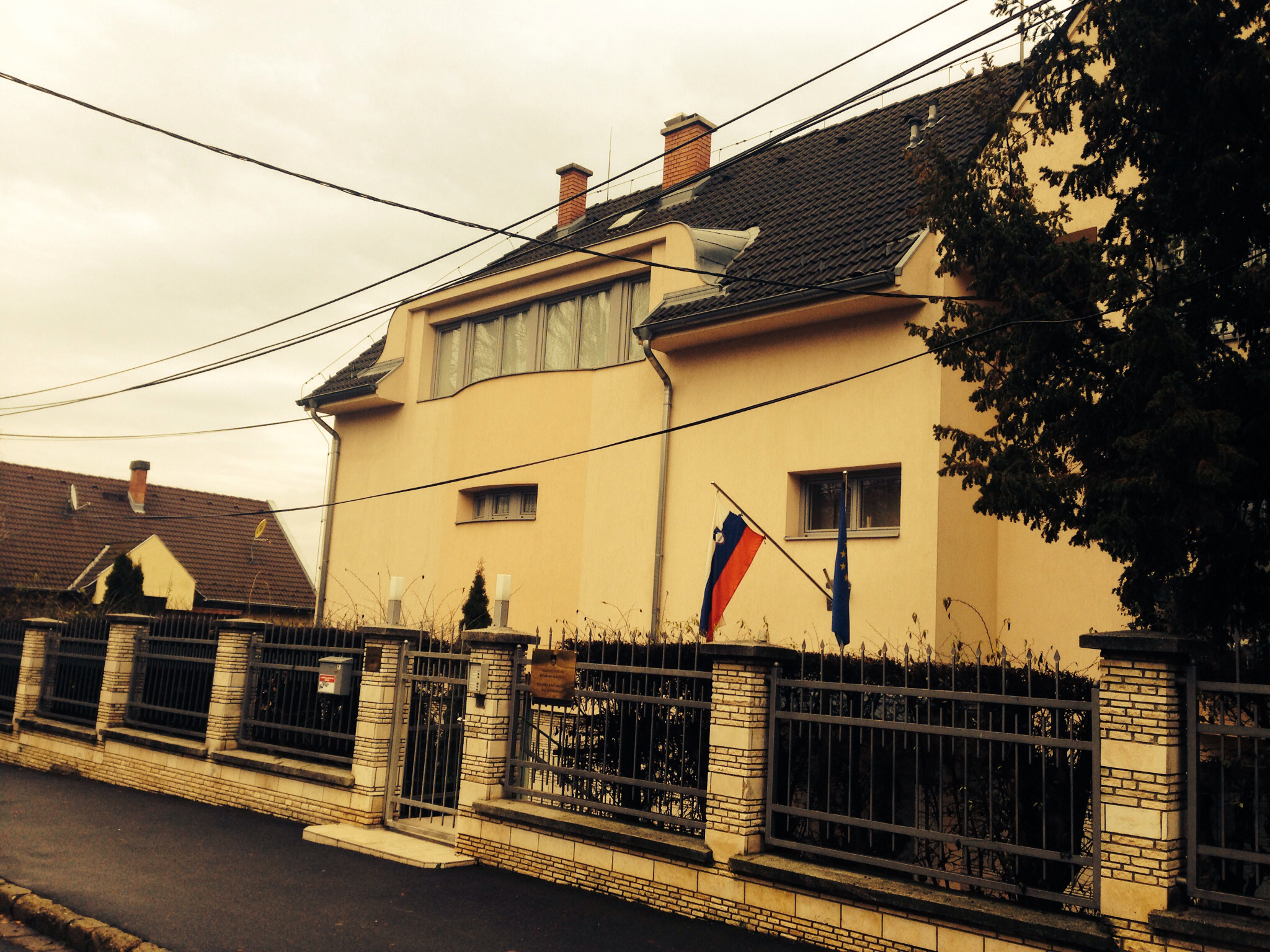
Embassy of Slovenia in Budapest

== See also ==
- Foreign relations of Hungary
- Foreign relations of Slovenia
- Hungarian Slovenes
- Hungary–Slovenia border
- Hungary–Yugoslavia relations
