= Dolnji Lakoš =

Dolnji Lakoš Alsólakos
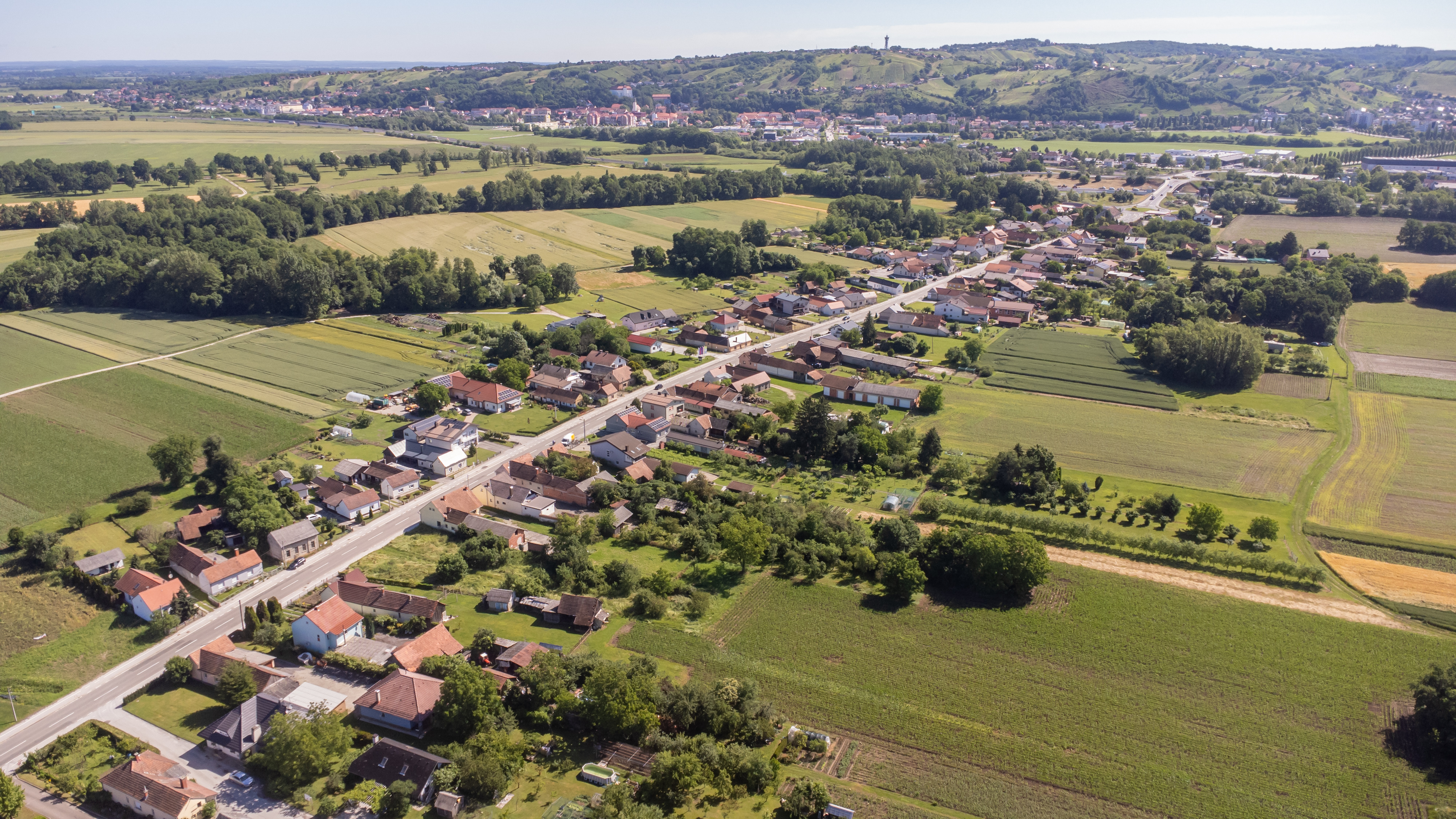

- Location in Slovenia
- Coordinates: 46°33′6.95″N 16°26′12.3″E
- Country: Slovenia
- Traditional region: Prekmurje
- Statistical region: Mura
- Municipality: Lendava

Area
  - Total: 2.44 km^{2} (0.94 sq mi)
- Elevation: 160.83 m (527.7 ft)

Population (2002)
  - Total: 243

Dolnji Lakoš (pronounced [ˈdoːlnji ˈlaːkɔʃ]; Hungarian: Alsólakos) is a village southwest of Lendava in the Prekmurje region of Slovenia.

== Geography ==
Dolnji Lakoš is a ribbon village along the road from Hotiza to Lendava. Swampy meadows and pastures lie north of the village, and there are tilled fields to the east. The village has no major stands of wooded territory, and the land is subject to flooding.

== Name ==
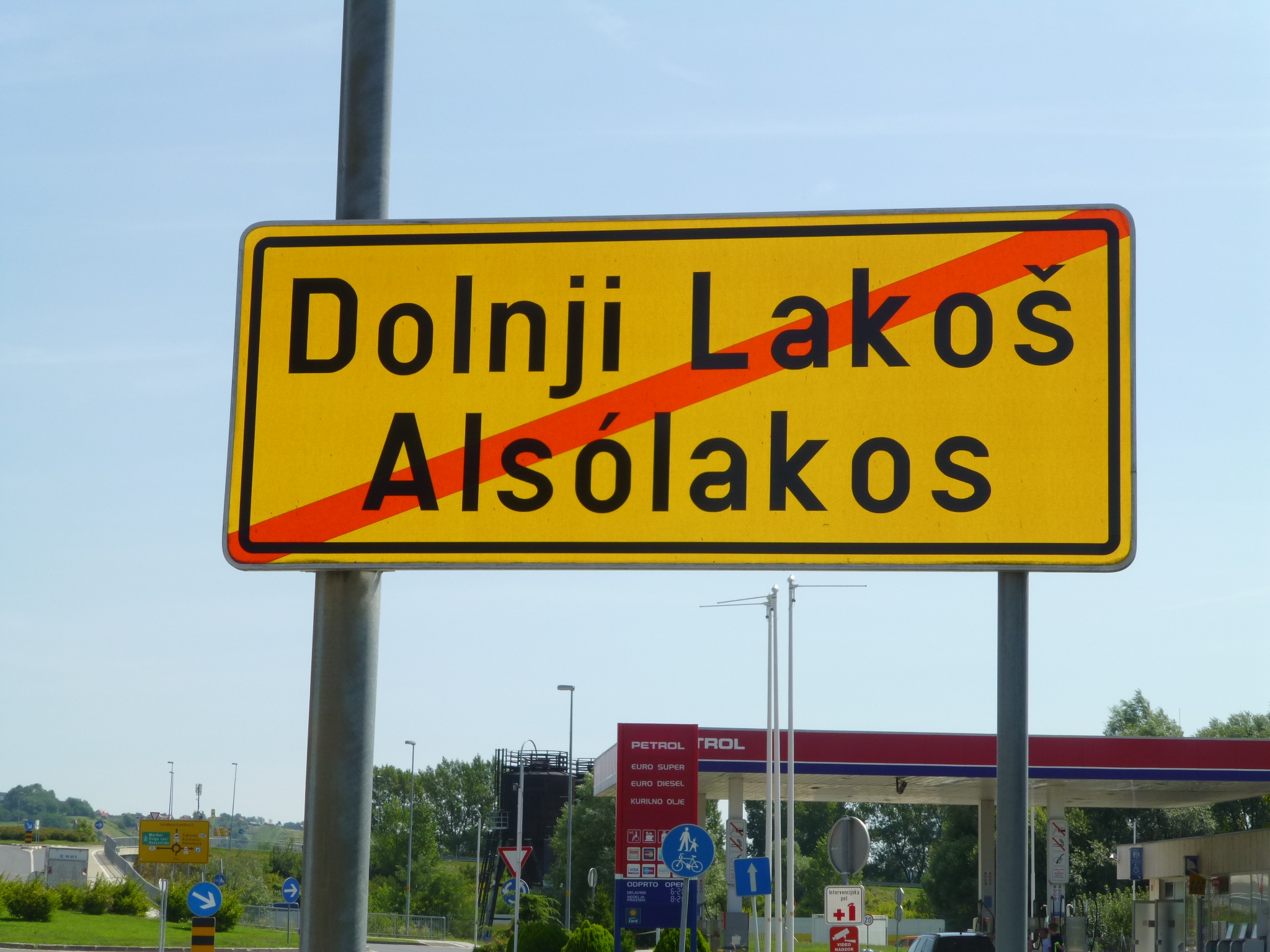
Bilingual sign in Dolnji Lakoš

The name Dolnji Lakoš literally means 'lower Lakoš', contrasting with neighboring Gornji Lakoš (literally, 'upper Lakoš'), which is about 1 meter (3 ft 3 in) higher in elevation. The Hungarian name Alsólakos semantically corresponds to the Slovene name and also means 'lower Lakoš'. In the 1380s, the village was recorded under the Slovene name Rybichi (literally, 'fishermen' < ribič 'fisherman') and the Hungarian name Halászokháza (literally, 'fishing settlement' < halász 'fisherman'), probably referring to its proximity to the Ledava River.

== Church ==
The local church in the settlement is dedicated to the Holy Cross and belongs to the Parish of Lendava.

== Archaeological site ==
Near the village is the site of the Oloris Bronze Age settlement, which was excavated in the 1980s. It was one of the most extensive excavations of a Bronze Age settlement in Slovenia. The archaeological evidence shows that the settlement was surrounded by an oak palisade. Postholes of the former dwellings clearly indicated an extensive and relatively dense settlement around a central courtyard with four hearths in the surrounding dwellings. There are dated artefacts and evidence of habitation from the late 14th and 13th centuries BC. Finds from the excavation are on permanent display at Lendava Castle.
