= Radmožanci =

Radmožanci Radamos
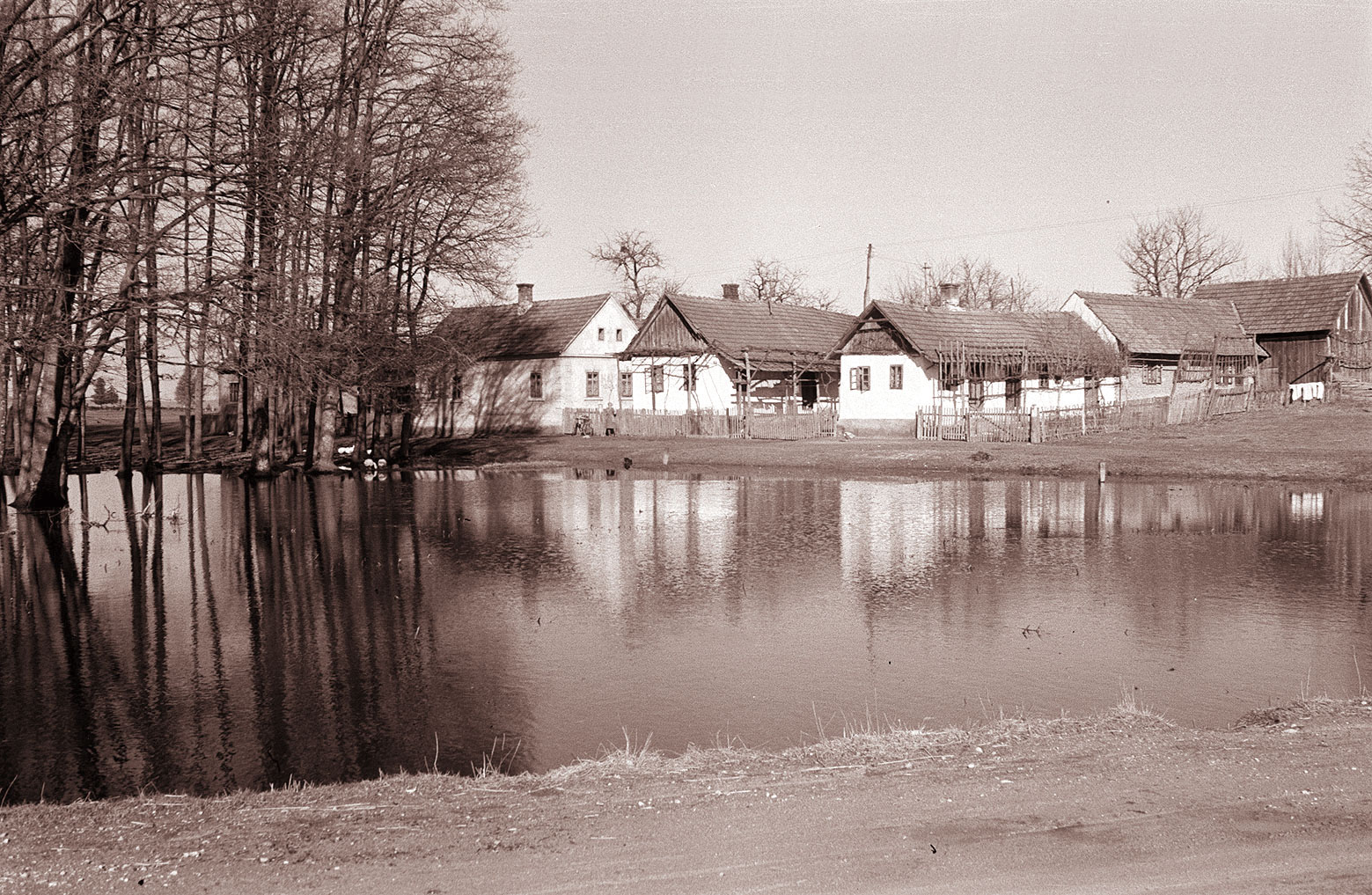

- Location in Slovenia
- Coordinates: 46°36′54.72″N 16°23′2.8″E
- Country: Slovenia
- Traditional region: Prekmurje
- Statistical region: Mura
- Municipality: Lendava

Area
  - Total: 11.93 km^{2} (4.61 sq mi)
- Elevation: 165.1 m (542 ft)

Population (2002)
  - Total: 254

Radmožanci (pronounced [ˈɾaːdmɔʒantsi] or [ɾadmɔˈʒaːntsi]; Hungarian: Radamos) is a settlement northwest of Lendava in the Prekmurje region of Slovenia.
