= Banuta =

Banuta Bánuta
- Location in Slovenia
- Coordinates: 46°36′4.27″N 16°24′42.08″E
- Country: Slovenia
- Traditional region: Prekmurje
- Statistical region: Mura
- Municipality: Lendava

Area
  - Total: 4.59 km^{2} (1.77 sq mi)
- Elevation: 162.8 m (534 ft)

Population (2002)
  - Total: 75

Banuta (pronounced [baˈnuːta]; Hungarian: Bánuta) is a small settlement north of Lendava in the Prekmurje region of Slovenia.
