= Trimlini =

Trimlini Hármasmalom
- Location in Slovenia
- Coordinates: 46°32′34.22″N 16°27′20.49″E
- Country: Slovenia
- Traditional region: Prekmurje
- Statistical region: Mura
- Municipality: Lendava

Area
  - Total: 4.99 km^{2} (1.93 sq mi)
- Elevation: 160 m (520 ft)

Population (2002)
  - Total: 330

Trimlini (pronounced [tɾiˈmliːni]; Hungarian: Hármasmalom) is a settlement south of Lendava in the Prekmurje region of Slovenia.
