= Čepinci =

Čepinci Kerkafő
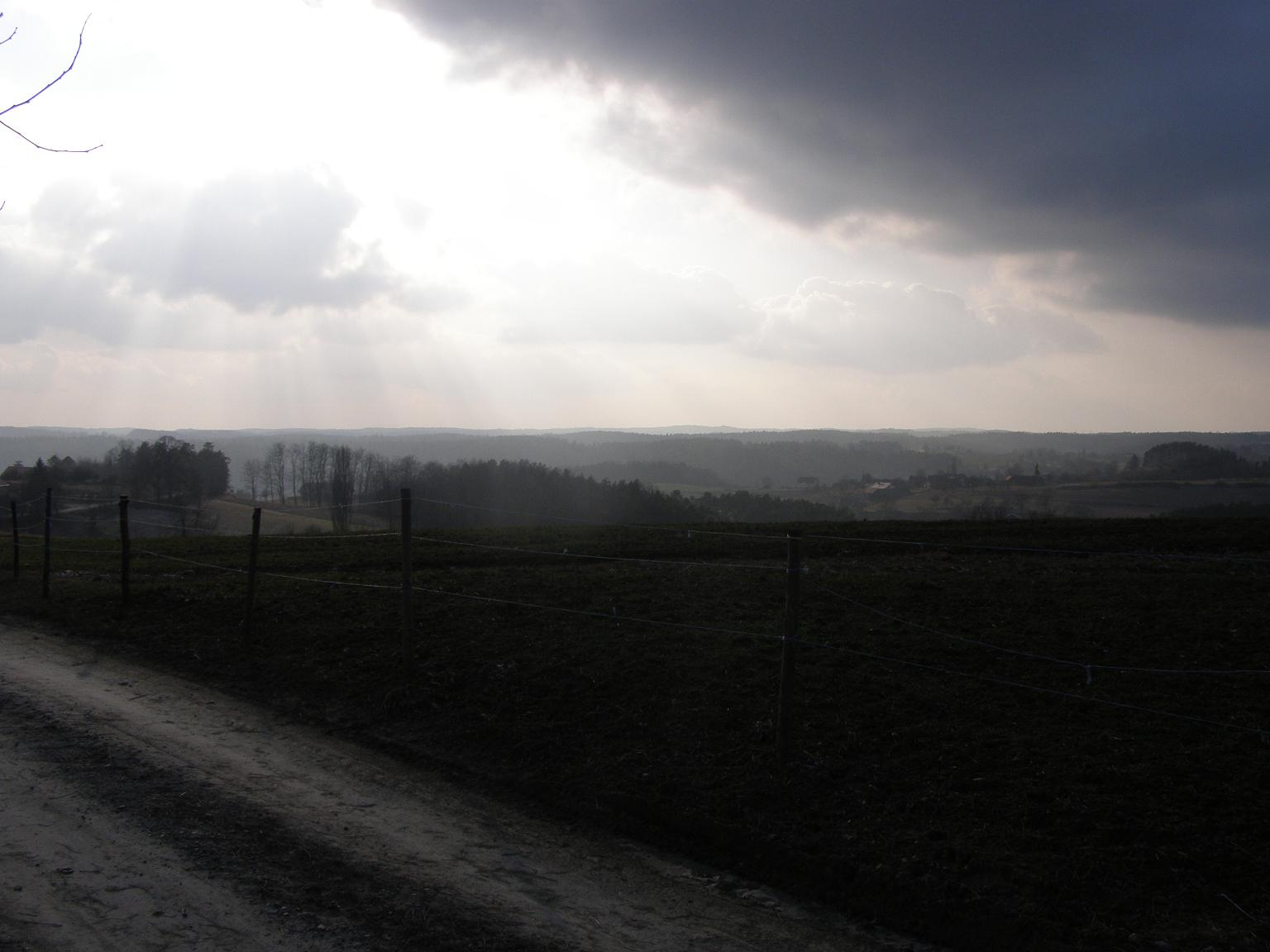

- Location in Slovenia
- Coordinates: 46°51′31.71″N 16°13′4.52″E
- Country: Slovenia
- Traditional region: Prekmurje
- Statistical region: Mura
- Municipality: Šalovci

Area
  - Total: 9.18 km^{2} (3.54 sq mi)
- Elevation: 334.9 m (1,099 ft)

Population (2002)
  - Total: 316

Čepinci (pronounced [ˈtʃeːpintsi]; Hungarian: Kerkafő, Prekmurje Slovene: Čöpinci) is a dispersed village in the Municipality of Šalovci in the Prekmurje region of Slovenia.

The source of the Big Krka River is in the settlement.

The poet Ferenc Marics lived in the village.
