= Municipality of Šalovci =

Municipality of Slovenia

Municipality of Šalovci Občina Šalovci
- Municipality
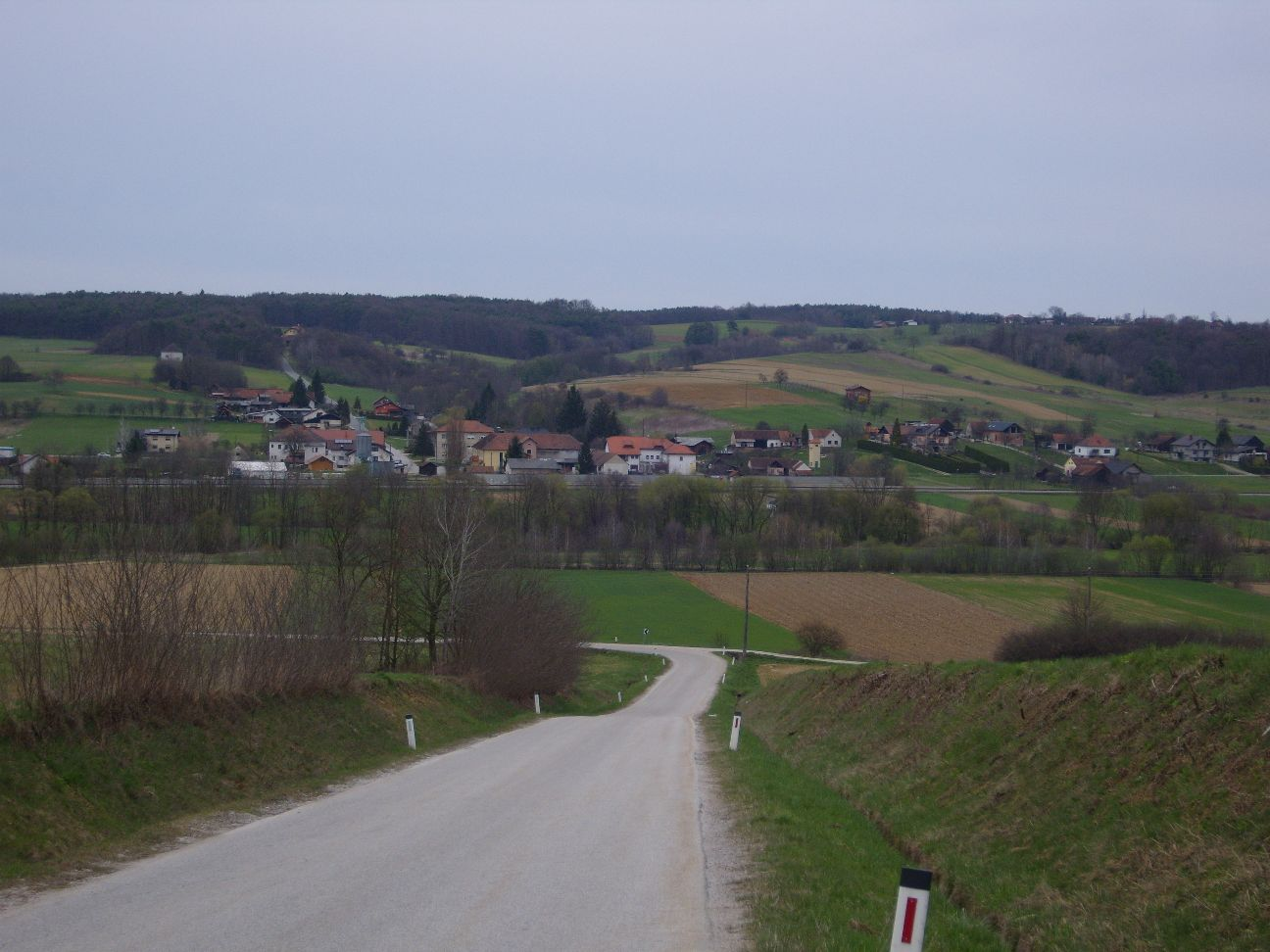

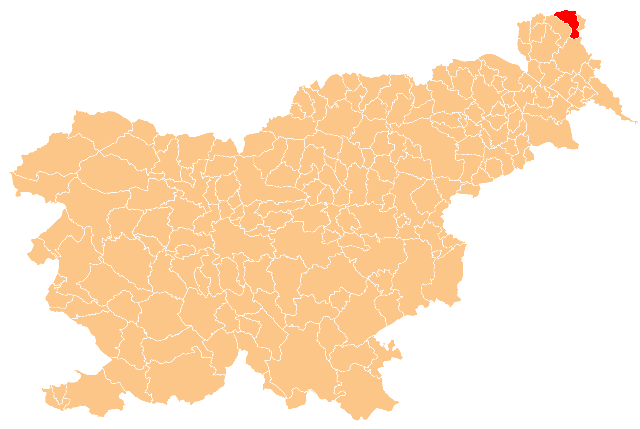
- Location of the Municipality of Šalovci in Slovenia
- Coordinates: 46°50′N 16°17′E
- Country: Slovenia

Government
  - Mayor: Iztok Fartek

Area
  - Total: 71.5 km^{2} (27.6 sq mi)

Population (July 1, 2018)
  - Total: 1,400
  - Density: 20/km^{2} (51/sq mi)
- Time zone: UTC+01 (CET)
  - Summer (DST): UTC+02 (CEST)
- Website: salovci.si

The Municipality of Šalovci (pronounced [ˈʃaːlɔu̯tsi]; Slovene: Občina Šalovci) is a municipality in the traditional region of Prekmurje in northeastern Slovenia. The seat of the municipality is the town of Šalovci. Šalovci became a municipality in 1994.

== Settlements ==
In addition to the municipal seat of Šalovci, the municipality also includes the following settlements:

- Budinci
- Čepinci
- Dolenci
- Domanjševci
- Markovci
