= Mostje, Lendava =

Mostje Hídvég
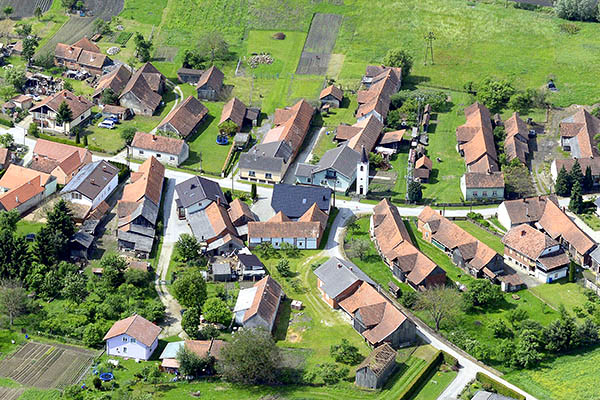

- Location in Slovenia
- Coordinates: 46°36′27.88″N 16°24′47.62″E
- Country: Slovenia
- Traditional region: Prekmurje
- Statistical region: Mura
- Municipality: Lendava

Area
  - Total: 3.95 km^{2} (1.53 sq mi)
- Elevation: 163.8 m (537 ft)

Population (2002)
  - Total: 363

Mostje (pronounced [ˈmoːstjɛ]; Hungarian: Hídvég) is a settlement north of Lendava in the Prekmurje region of Slovenia, on the border with Hungary.
