= Lendavske Gorice =

Lendavske Gorice Lendvahegy
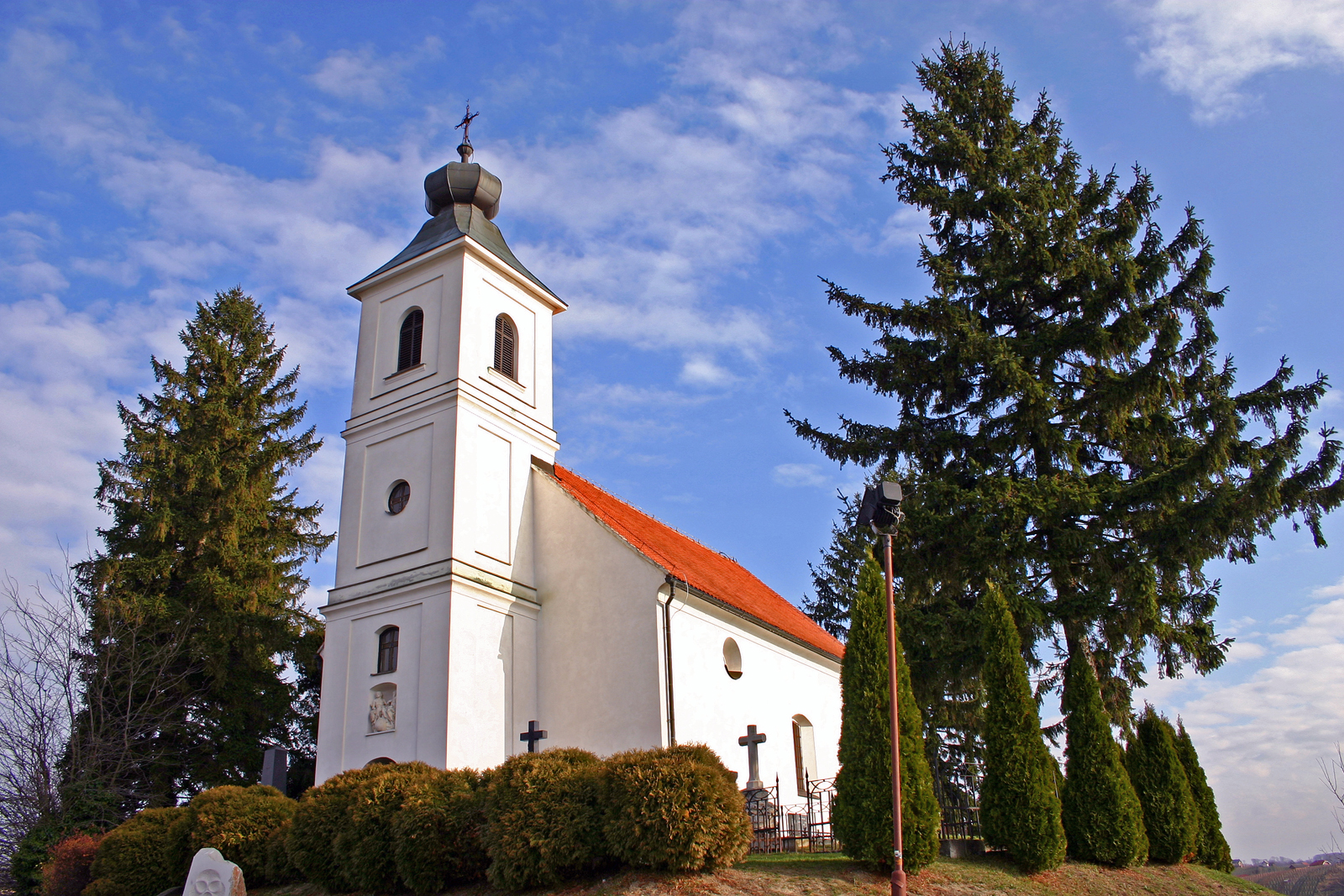
- Church of the Holy Trinity, Lendavske Gorice

- Location in Slovenia
- Coordinates: 46°34′0.33″N 16°27′34.02″E
- Country: Slovenia
- Traditional region: Prekmurje
- Statistical region: Mura
- Municipality: Lendava

Area
  - Total: 2.85 km^{2} (1.10 sq mi)
- Elevation: 280.2 m (919 ft)

Population (2002)
  - Total: 586

Lendavske Gorice (pronounced [ˈleːndau̯skɛ ɡɔˈɾiːtsɛ]; Hungarian: Lendvahegy) is a settlement in the hills immediately east of Lendava in the Prekmurje region of Slovenia.

The local church in the settlement is dedicated to the Holy Trinity and belongs to the Parish of Lendava. It was built in 1728 by the Gludovácz family. When excavating for the foundations of the church, a wooden coffin was discovered containing the body of Mihael Hadik, who died fighting the Ottoman Turks in 1603. His mummy is now on display in the church.

== Notable people ==
Notable people that were born or lived in Lendavske Gorice include: János Murkovics (teacher, writer)
