= Petišovci =

Petišovci Petesháza
- Location in Slovenia
- Coordinates: 46°31′33.47″N 16°27′52.23″E
- Country: Slovenia
- Traditional region: Prekmurje
- Statistical region: Mura
- Municipality: Lendava

Area
  - Total: 6.33 km^{2} (2.44 sq mi)
- Elevation: 158.2 m (519 ft)

Population (2002)
  - Total: 843

Petišovci (pronounced [pɛtiˈʃoːu̯tsi] or [ˈpɛːtiʃɔu̯tsi]; Hungarian: Petesháza) is a settlement south of Lendava in the Prekmurje region of Slovenia. It lies on the left bank of the Mura River, right on the border with Croatia.

== Buildings ==
The local church in the settlement is dedicated to Saint Rosalia and belongs to the Parish of Lendava. It was built in 1994.

== Sport ==
Petišovci Stadium is a purpose built motorcycle speedway stadium located east of Petišovci, off the Rudarska ulica. The facility hosts the Športno Društvo Lendava team and has been a significant venue for speedway hosting important events, including qualifying rounds of the Speedway World Championship.
