= Bajánsenye =

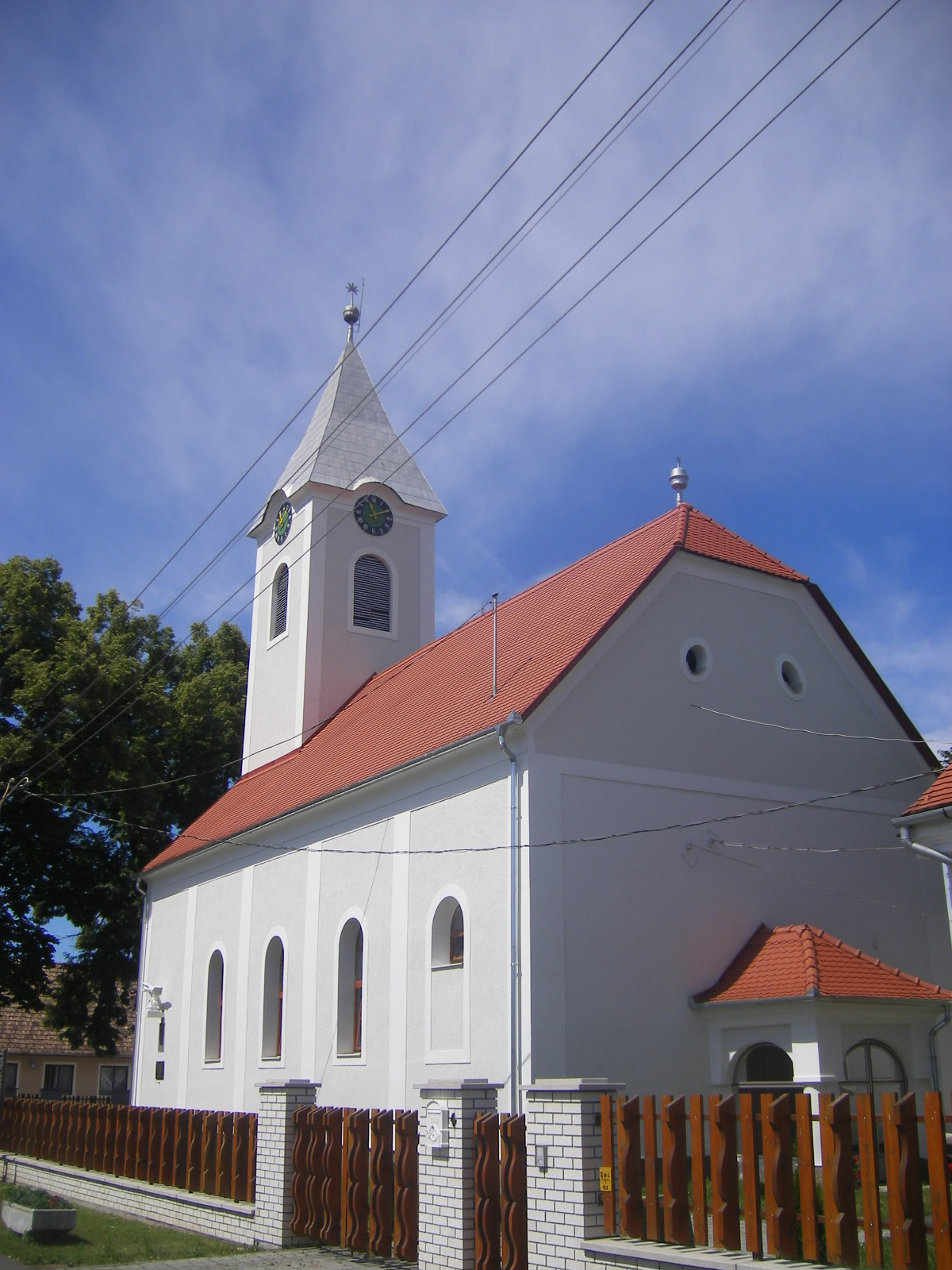

- Seal

- Location of Vas county in Hungary

- Location of Bajánsenye
- Coordinates: 46.80163°N 16.38422°E
- Country: Hungary
- County: Vas

Area
  - Total: 21.85 km^{2} (8.44 sq mi)

Population (2004)
  - Total: 558
  - Density: 25.54/km^{2} (66.1/sq mi)
- Time zone: UTC+1 (CET)
  - Summer (DST): UTC+2 (CEST)
- Postal code: 9944
- Area code: 94

Bajánsenye (Hungarian pronunciation: [ˈbɒjaːnʃɛɲɛ]) is a village in Vas County, Hungary.
