= Hotiza =

- Interactive map of Hotiza
- Location in Slovenia
- Coordinates: 46°32′57.81″N 16°21′32.22″E
- Country: Slovenia
- Traditional region: Prekmurje
- Statistical region: Mura
- Municipality: Lendava

Area
  - Total: 4.91 km^{2} (1.90 sq mi)
- Elevation: 165 m (541 ft)

Population (2002)
  - Total: 777

Hotiza (pronounced [xɔˈtiːza]; Hungarian: Murarév) is a village west of Lendava in the Prekmurje region of Slovenia. It lies on the left bank of the Mura River, right on the border with Croatia.

== Name ==
Hotiza was attested in written sources in 1389 as curia Hotyza (and as Hothyza in 1524). Older Hungarian attestations of the name include Hodica and Hotica. The origin of the name is unclear and the name is also unusual because no other Slovene toponym ends in -iza. The name may be connected to the Slavic personal name *Xotimirъ or *Xotislavъ.

== Church ==
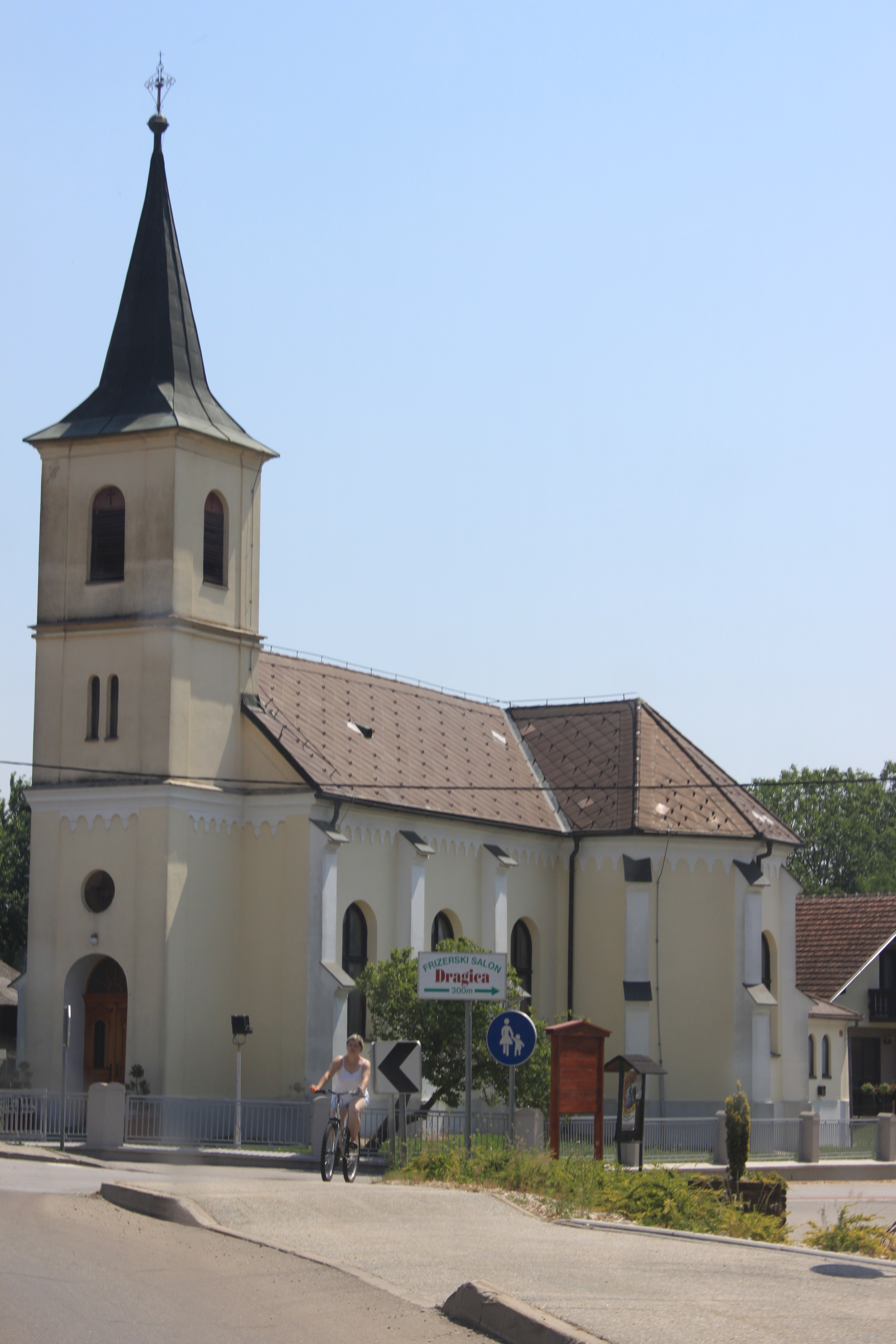
Sts. Peter and Paul Church

The parish church in the settlement is dedicated to Saints Peter and Paul and belongs to the Roman Catholic Diocese of Murska Sobota. It was originally a small chapel dedicated to the Sacred Heart of Jesus, but was extended and rededicated in 1924 when it also became an independent parish.
