= Genterovci =

Genterovci Göntérháza
- Village
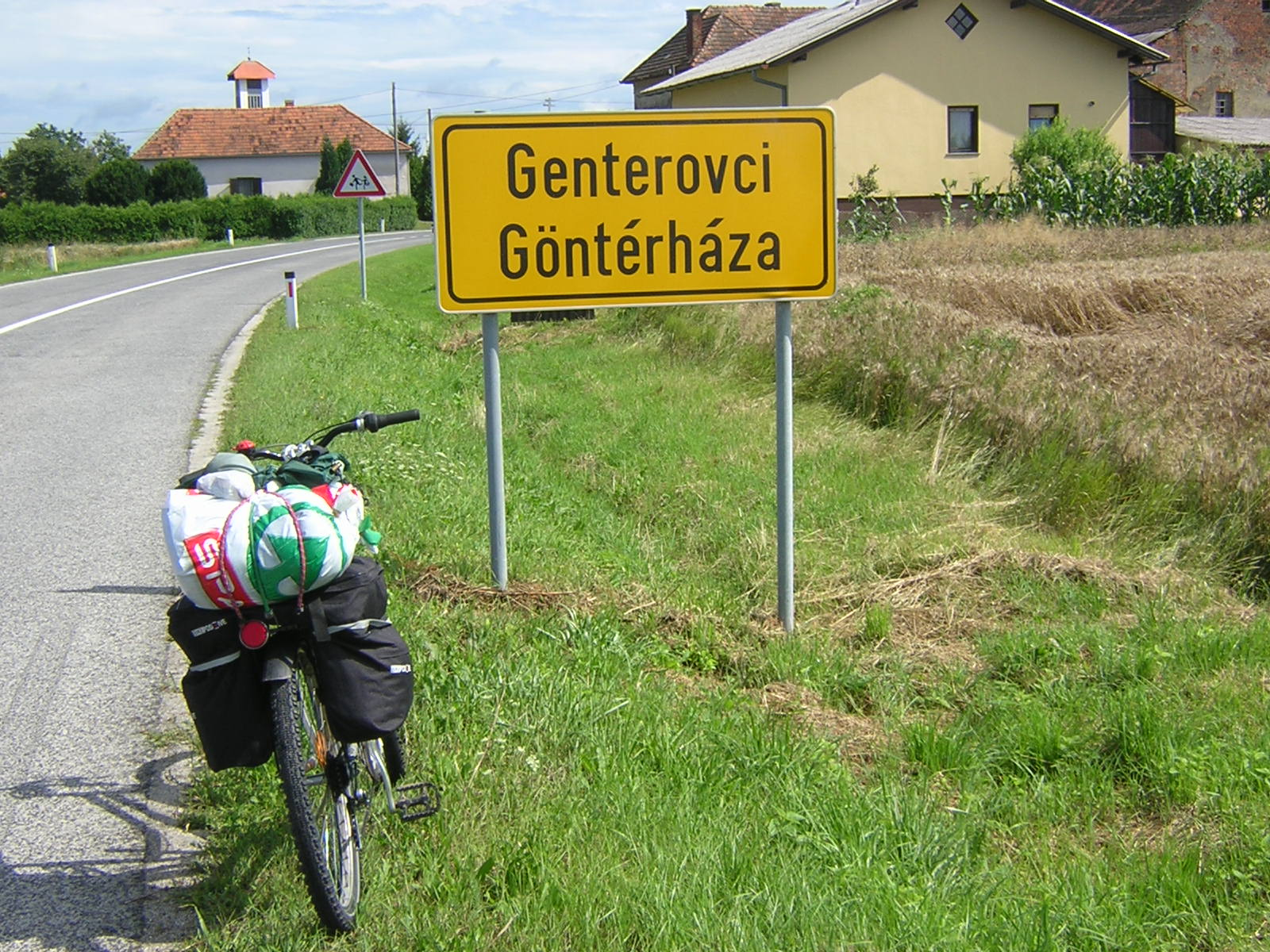

- Location in Slovenia
- Coordinates: 46°37′11.56″N 16°24′22.67″E
- Country: Slovenia
- Traditional region: Prekmurje
- Statistical region: Mura
- Municipality: Lendava

Area
  - Total: 3.31 km^{2} (1.28 sq mi)
- Elevation: 163.8 m (537 ft)

Population (2002)
  - Total: 206

Genterovci (pronounced [ɡɛntɛˈɾoːu̯tsi]; Hungarian: Göntérháza) is a settlement north of Lendava in the Prekmurje region of Slovenia. It lies on the border with Hungary.
