= Municipality of Lendava =

Municipality of Slovenia

Municipality of Lendava Občina Lendava Lendva község
- Municipality
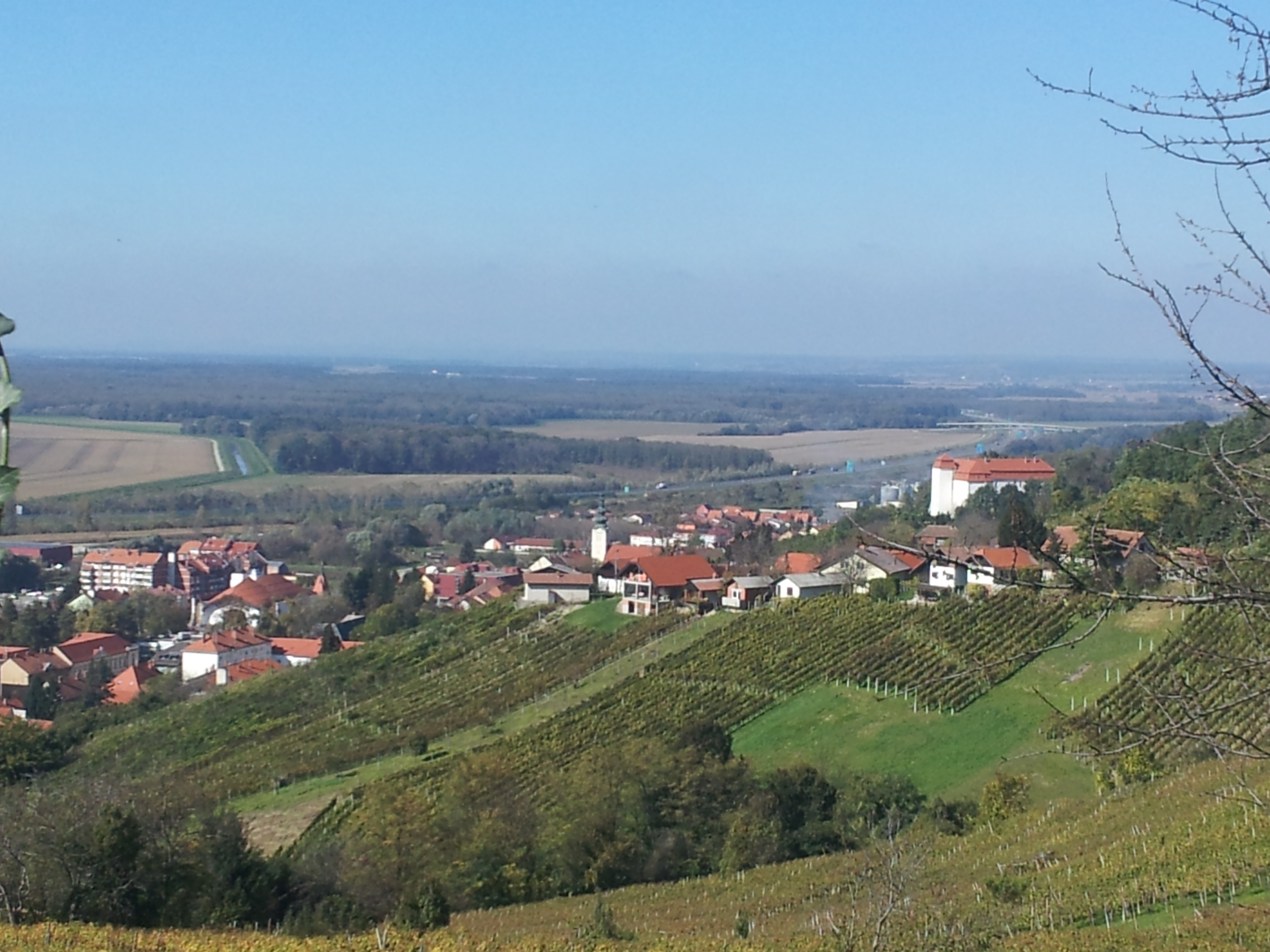

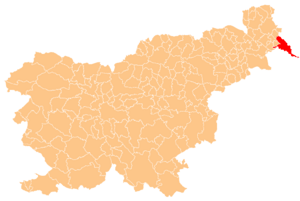
- Location of the Municipality of Lendava in Slovenia
- Coordinates: 46°34′N 16°27′E
- Country: Slovenia

Government
  - Mayor: Janez Magyar (SDS)

Area
  - Total: 121 km^{2} (47 sq mi)

Population (2021)
  - Total: 10,404
  - Density: 86.0/km^{2} (223/sq mi)
- Time zone: UTC+01 (CET)
  - Summer (DST): UTC+02 (CEST)
- Website: www.lendava.si

The Municipality of Lendava (pronounced [ˈleːndaʋa]; Slovene: Občina Lendava; Hungarian: Lendva község) is a municipality in the traditional region of Prekmurje in northeastern Slovenia. The seat of the municipality is the town of Lendava. Lendava became a municipality in 1994. It borders Croatia.

== Settlements ==
In addition to the municipal seat of Lendava, the municipality also includes the following settlements:

- Banuta
- Benica
- Brezovec
- Čentiba
- Dolga Vas
- Dolgovaške Gorice
- Dolina pri Lendavi
- Dolnji Lakoš
- Gaberje
- Genterovci
- Gornji Lakoš
- Hotiza
- Kamovci
- Kapca
- Kot
- Lendavske Gorice
- Mostje
- Petišovci
- Pince
- Pince–Marof
- Radmožanci
- Trimlini

== Demographics ==
The population by native language according to the 2002 census was:

- Slovene: 5,516 (49.47%)
- Hungarian: 4,390 (39.37%)
- Other Europeans and unknown: 1,245 (11.16%)
- Total: 11,151
