= Budinci =

Budinci Bűdfalva
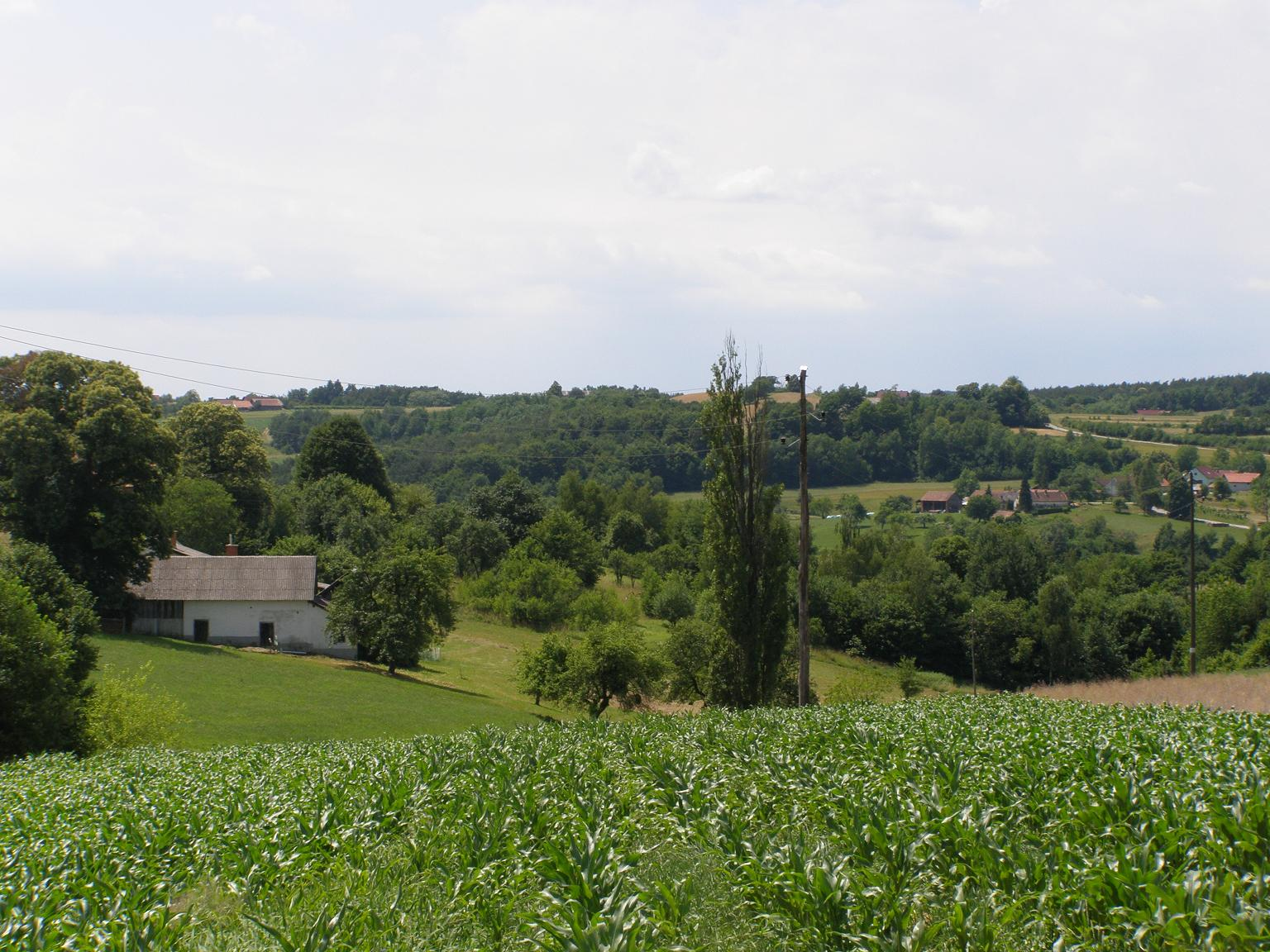

- Location in Slovenia
- Coordinates: 46°51′35.16″N 16°15′23.34″E
- Country: Slovenia
- Traditional region: Prekmurje
- Statistical region: Mura
- Municipality: Šalovci

Area
  - Total: 6.17 km^{2} (2.38 sq mi)
- Elevation: 285.4 m (936 ft)

Population (2002)
  - Total: 139

Budinci (pronounced [ˈbuːdintsi]; Hungarian: Bűdfalva, Prekmurje Slovene: Büdinci) is a dispersed village in the Municipality of Šalovci in the Prekmurje region of Slovenia.

The northernmost tip of Slovenia is within the village's territory to the northwest of the main settlement with a latitude of 46° 52′ 37″.

There is a simple two-storey belfry in the southeastern part of the settlement, opposite the cemetery. It dates to the first half of the 20th century.
