= Gornji Lakoš =

Gornji Lakoš Felsőlakos
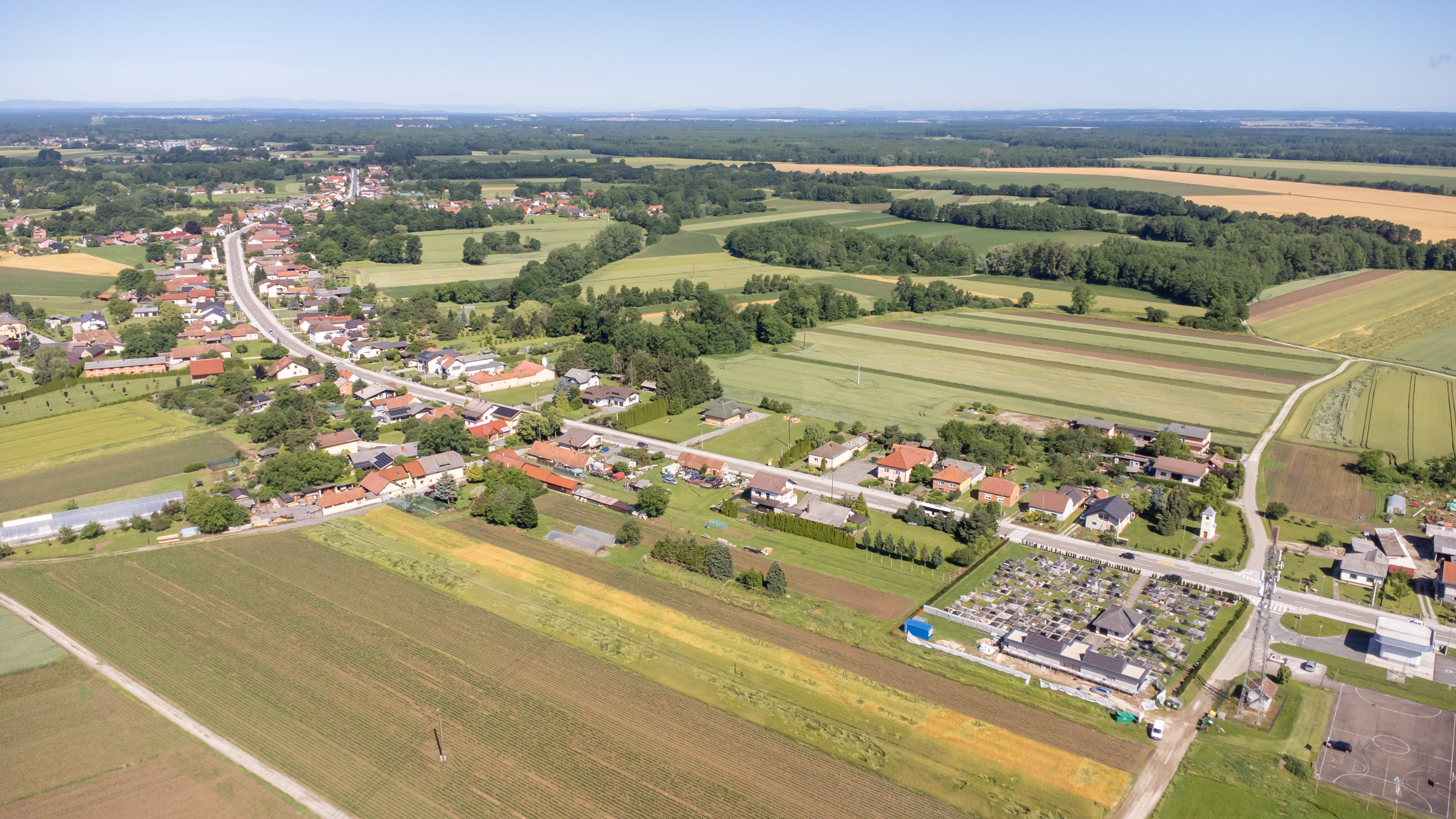

- Location in Slovenia
- Coordinates: 46°33′9″N 16°25′5″E
- Country: Slovenia
- Traditional region: Prekmurje
- Statistical region: Mura
- Municipality: Lendava

Area
  - Total: 5.14 km^{2} (1.98 sq mi)
- Elevation: 161.1 m (529 ft)

Population (2002)
  - Total: 438

Gornji Lakoš (pronounced [ˈɡoːɾnji ˈlaːkɔʃ]; Hungarian: Felsőlakos) is a village southwest of Lendava in the Prekmurje region of Slovenia.

== Name ==
The name Gornji Lakoš literally means 'upper Lakoš', contrasting with neighboring Dolnji Lakoš (literally, 'lower Lakoš'), which is about 1 meter (3 ft 3 in) lower in elevation. The Hungarian name Felsőlakos semantically corresponds to the Slovene name and also means 'upper Lakoš'.

== Church ==
The local church in the settlement is dedicated to Saint Stephen and belongs to the Parish of Lendava.
