= Pince–Marof =

Pince–Marof Pincemajor
- Location in Slovenia
- Coordinates: 46°30′57.42″N 16°30′21.77″E
- Country: Slovenia
- Traditional region: Prekmurje
- Statistical region: Mura
- Municipality: Lendava

Area
  - Total: 13.47 km^{2} (5.20 sq mi)
- Elevation: 155.5 m (510 ft)

Population (2022)
  - Total: 74

Pince–Marof (pronounced [ˈpiːntsɛ ˈmaːɾɔf]; Slovene: Pince - Marof, Hungarian: Pincemajor) is a settlement southeast of Lendava in the Prekmurje region of Slovenia. It lies close to the border with Hungary and its territory extends to the extreme eastern point of Slovenia.
