= Čentiba =

Čentiba Csente
- Location in Slovenia
- Coordinates: 46°33′0.4″N 16°29′15.22″E
- Country: Slovenia
- Traditional region: Prekmurje
- Statistical region: Mura
- Municipality: Lendava

Area
  - Total: 7.33 km^{2} (2.83 sq mi)
- Elevation: 196.3 m (644 ft)

Population (2002)
  - Total: 756

Čentiba (pronounced [tʃɛnˈtiːba]; Hungarian: Csente) is a settlement southeast of Lendava in the Prekmurje region of Slovenia, close to the border with Hungary.

The local church in the settlement is dedicated to the Nativity of Mary and belongs to the Parish of Lendava.
