= Dolga Vas, Lendava =

Dolga Vas Hosszúfalu
- Interactive map of Dolga Vas
- Location in Slovenia
- Coordinates: 46°34′44.27″N 16°26′51.85″E
- Country: Slovenia
- Traditional region: Prekmurje
- Statistical region: Mura
- Municipality: Lendava

Area
  - Total: 9.95 km^{2} (3.84 sq mi)
- Elevation: 178.2 m (585 ft)

Population (2002)
  - Total: 621

Dolga Vas (pronounced [ˈdɔ̀ːwɡa ˈʋáːs]; Slovene: Dolga vas, Hungarian: Hosszúfalu) is a settlement immediately north of Lendava in the Prekmurje region of Slovenia. It lies on the border with Hungary.

== Notable people ==
Notable people that were born or lived in Dolga Vas include:

- Mária Pozsonec (1940–2017), politician
