= Rédics =

Rédics Redič (in Slovene)
- Village
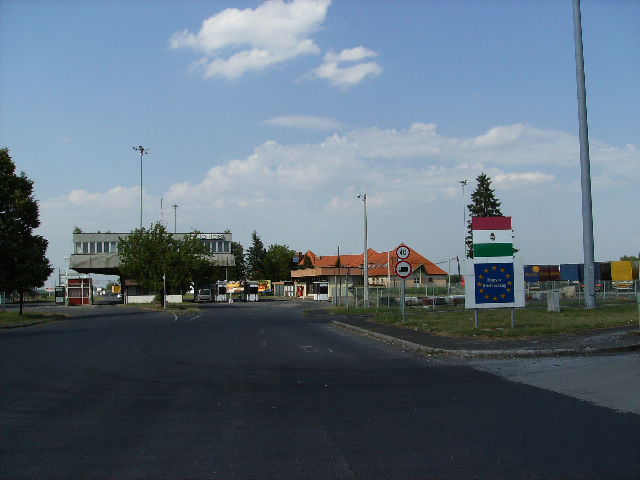
- The border with Slovenia

- Flag Coat of arms

- Location of Rédics
- Coordinates: 46.61415°N 16.48745°E
- Country: Hungary
- Region: Western Transdanubia
- County: Zala
- District: Lenti

Area
  - Total: 25.32 km^{2} (9.78 sq mi)

Population (1 January 2025)
  - Total: 869
  - Density: 34.3/km^{2} (88.9/sq mi)
- Time zone: UTC+1 (CET)
  - Summer (DST): UTC+2 (CEST)
- Postal code: 8978
- Area code: (+36) 92
- Website: redics.hu

Rédics is a village in Zala County, Hungary.
