= Kapca =

- Location in Slovenia
- Coordinates: 46°33′13.03″N 16°22′47.76″E
- Country: Slovenia
- Traditional region: Prekmurje
- Statistical region: Mura
- Municipality: Lendava

Area
  - Total: 6.01 km^{2} (2.32 sq mi)
- Elevation: 164.5 m (540 ft)

Population (2002)
  - Total: 450

Kapca (pronounced [ˈkaːptsa]; Hungarian: Kapca) is a village west of Lendava in the Prekmurje region of Slovenia.

The small church in the settlement is dedicated to Saint James and belongs to the Parish of Lendava.
