= Pince =

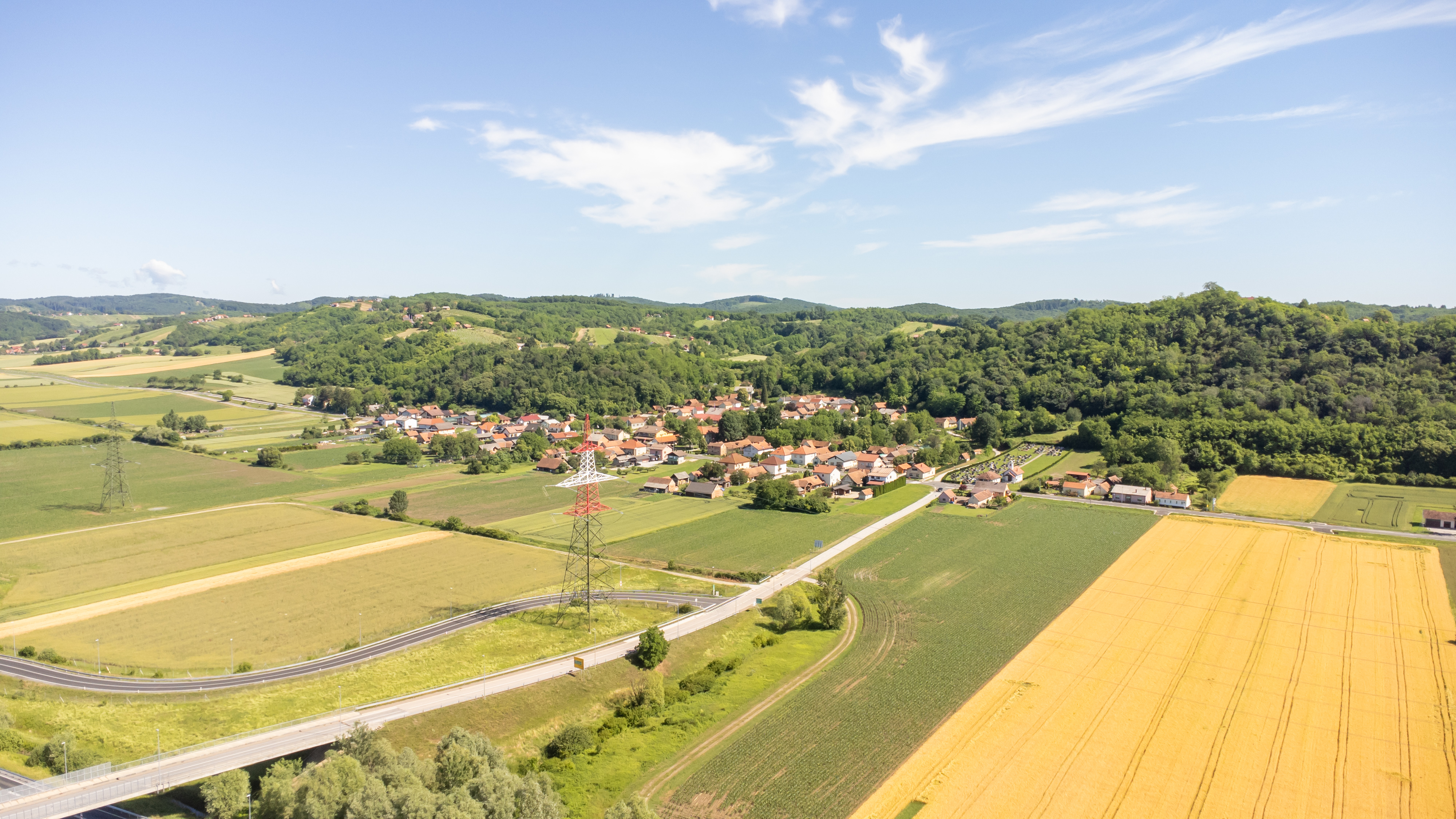
- Interactive map of Pince
- Location in Slovenia
- Coordinates: 46°31′32.27″N 16°31′20.45″E
- Country: Slovenia
- Traditional region: Prekmurje
- Statistical region: Mura
- Municipality: Lendava

Area
  - Total: 2.29 km^{2} (0.88 sq mi)
- Elevation: 161.3 m (529 ft)

Population (2002)
  - Total: 205

Pince (pronounced [ˈpiːntsɛ]; in older sources also Pinica, Hungarian: Pince) is a settlement southeast of Lendava in the Prekmurje region of Slovenia. It lies close to the extreme eastern point of Slovenia, right on the border with Hungary.

== Name ==
The Slovene name Pince is borrowed from the Hungarian name of the village (which itself was borrowed from Slovene) and has replaced the older Slovene name Pinica. The name derives from the Slovene common noun pivnica, which means 'wine cellar' in the local dialect, via the development *Pivьnica > *Pivnice > *Pinice > *Pince.
