= Kercaszomor =

- Location of Vas county in Hungary

- Location of Kercaszomor
- Coordinates: 46.78810°N 16.34396°E
- Country: Hungary
- County: Vas

Area
  - Total: 12.87 km^{2} (4.97 sq mi)

Population (2004)
  - Total: 214
  - Density: 16.62/km^{2} (43.0/sq mi)
- Time zone: UTC+1 (CET)
  - Summer (DST): UTC+2 (CEST)
- Postal code: 9945
- Area code: 94

Kercaszomor (Slovene: Krčica-Somorovci) is a village in Vas county, Hungary. It was created in 1942 by the unification of two villages (Kerca and Szomoróc).

It has very little water access and is in the middle of land no large bodies of water around it.
