= Domanjševci =

Domanjševci Domonkosfa
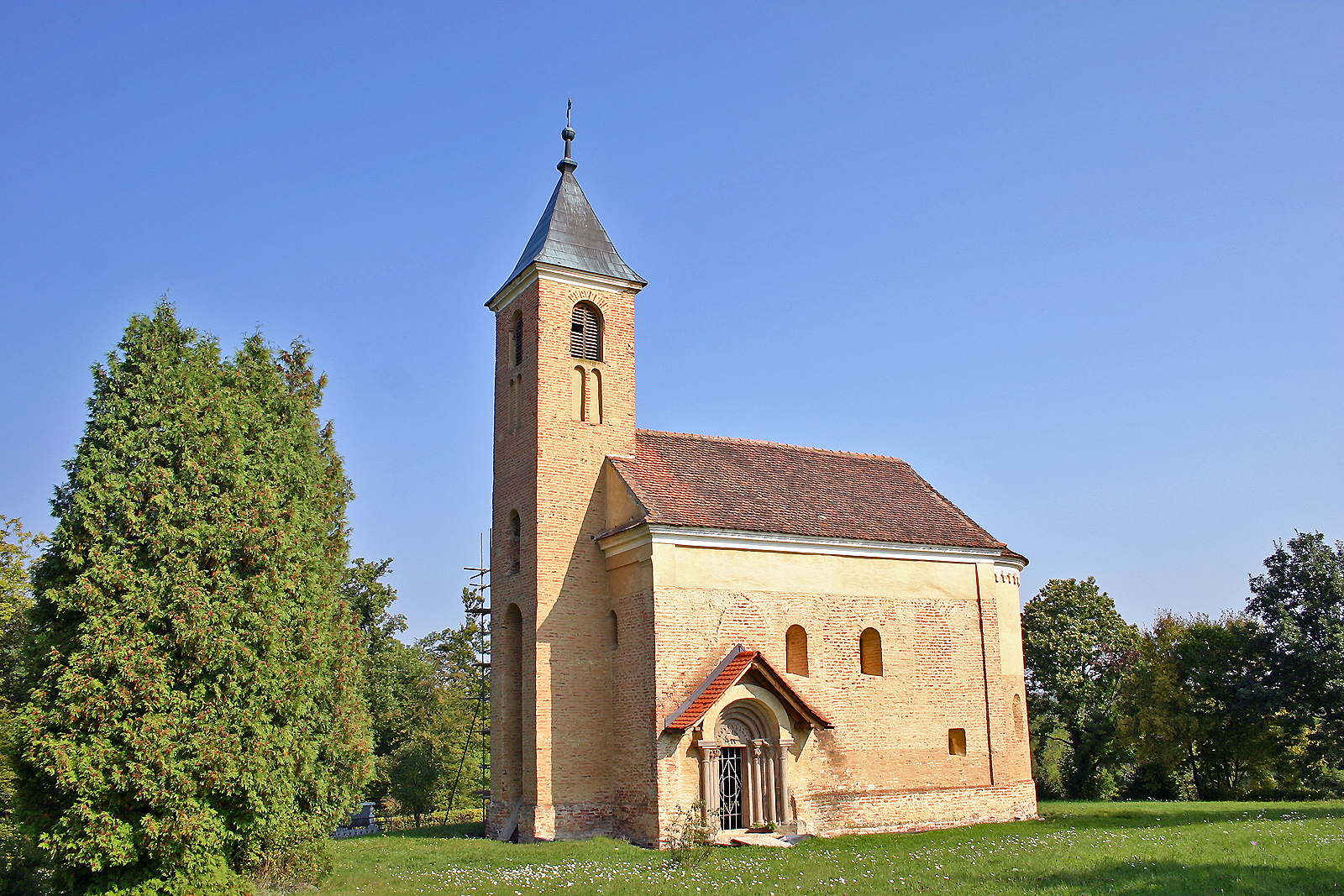
- Saint Martin's Church

- Location in Slovenia
- Coordinates: 46°47′2.5″N 16°17′15.33″E
- Country: Slovenia
- Traditional region: Prekmurje
- Statistical region: Mura
- Municipality: Šalovci

Area
  - Total: 11.58 km^{2} (4.47 sq mi)
- Elevation: 252.1 m (827 ft)

Population (2002)
  - Total: 301

Domanjševci (pronounced [dɔˈmaːnʃɛu̯tsi]; in older sources also Domanjšovci, Hungarian: Domonkosfa) is a village in the Municipality of Šalovci in the Prekmurje region of Slovenia, right on the border with Hungary.

There are two churches in the settlement. The Roman Catholic church is built on a small hill southwest of the settlement in the middle of a small cemetery and is dedicated to Saint Martin. It is a single-nave brick building with a Romanesque portal dating to the 13th century. It was originally dedicated to Saint Wenceslas. The Lutheran church in the settlement was built in 1902 in a Neo-Romanesque style. Its designer was the architect Alojz Kleiber.

The poet, writer, and teacher István Szijjártó lived and died in the village.
