= Lendava =

Lendava Lendva (Hungarian)
- Town
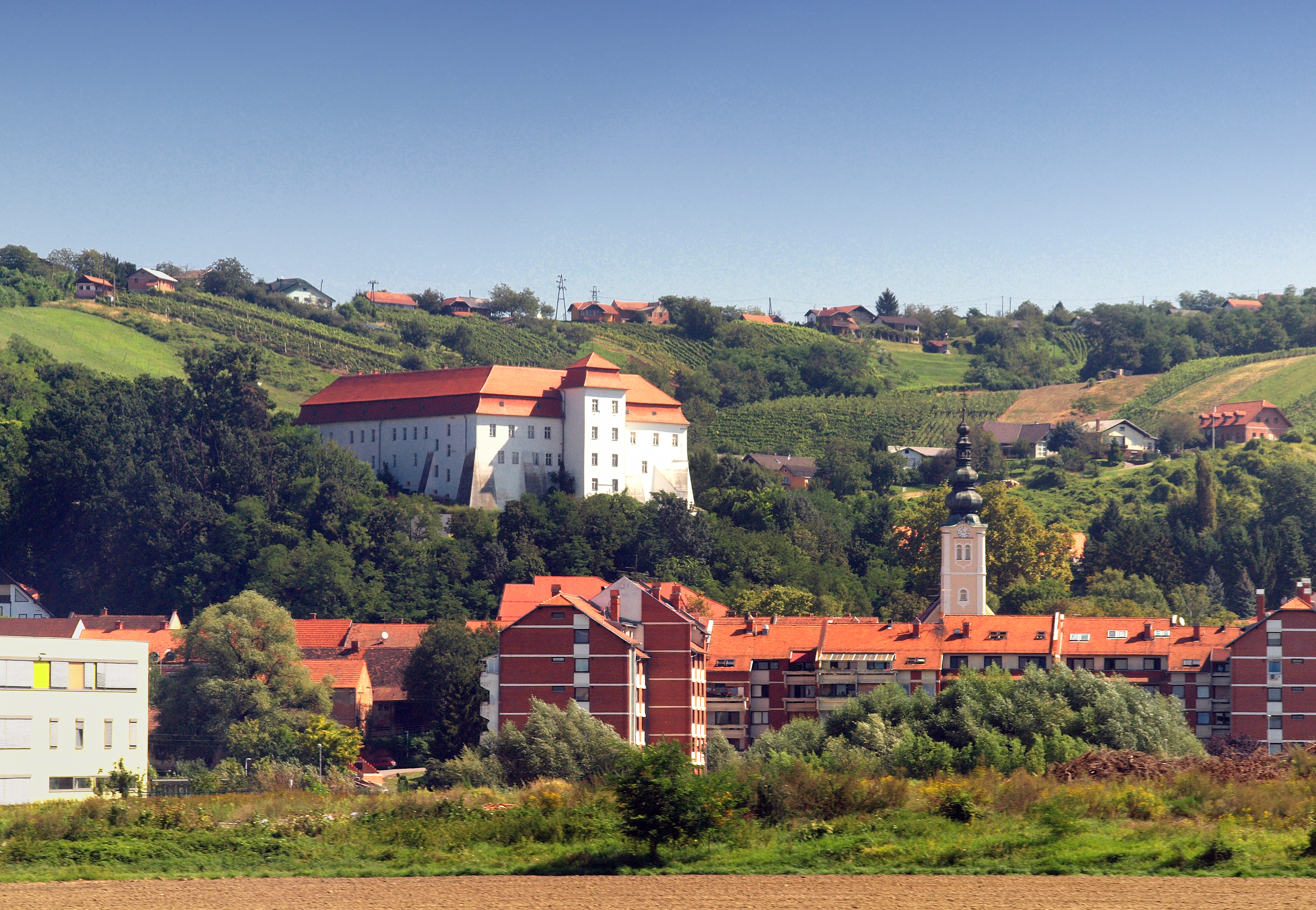
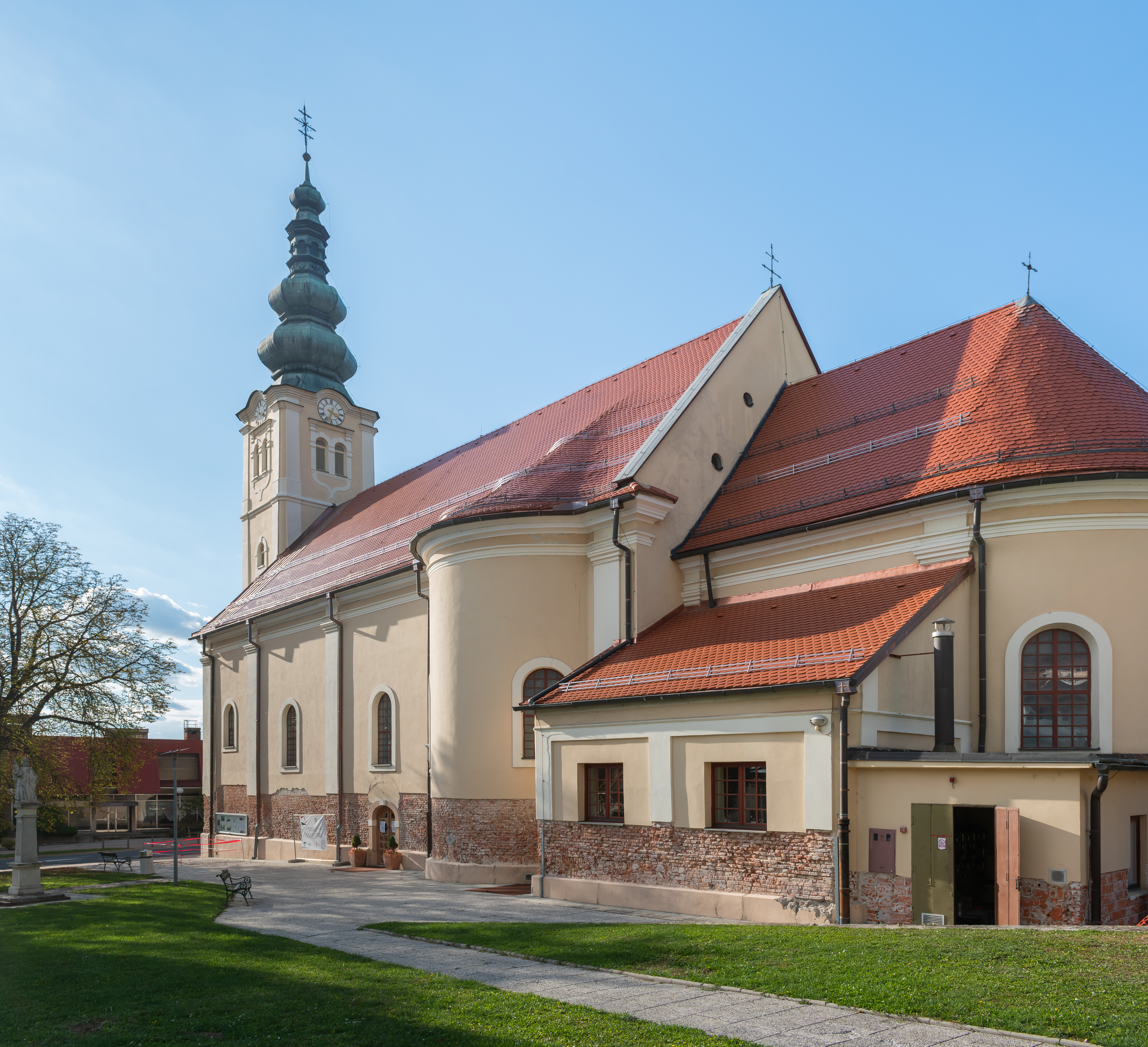
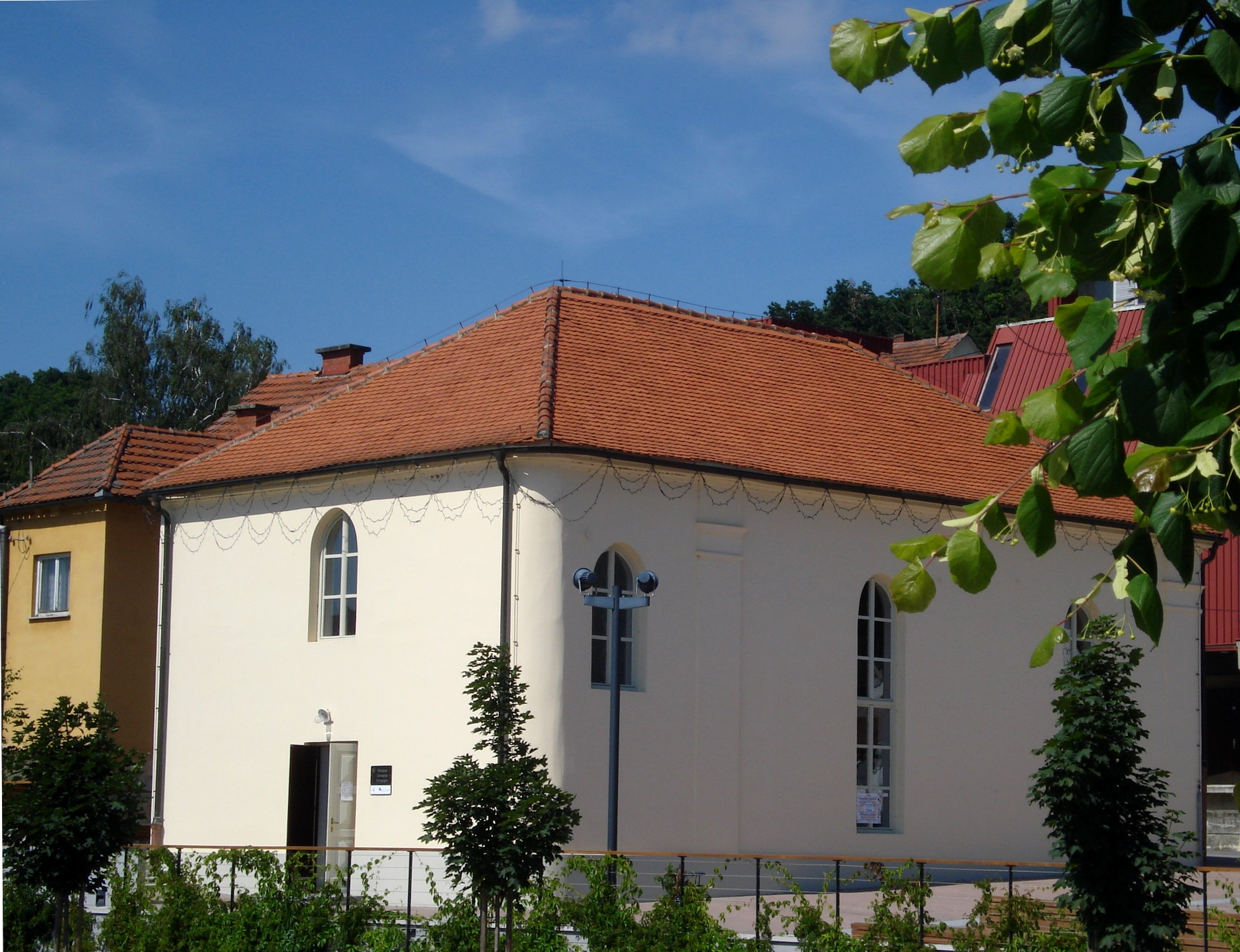
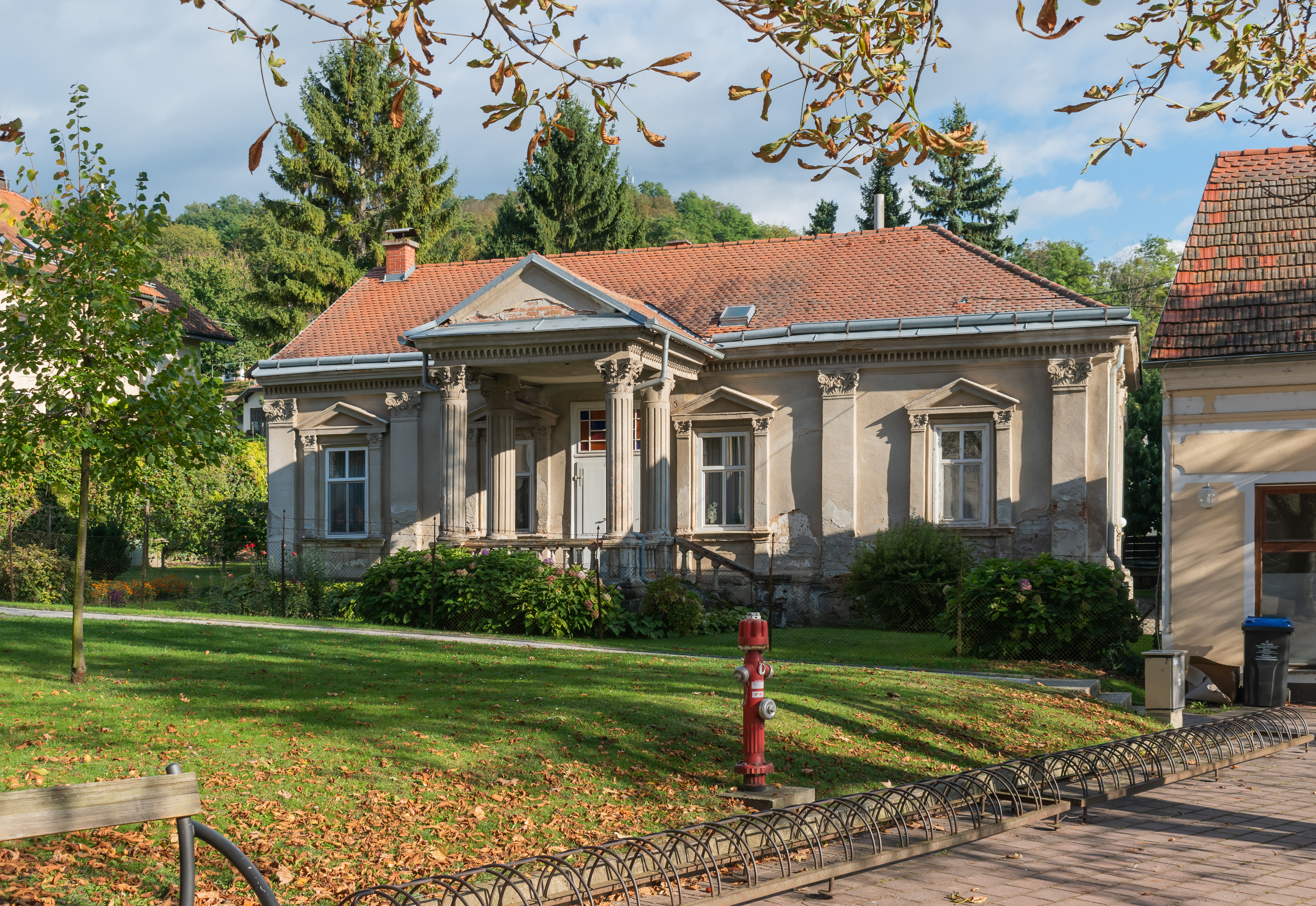
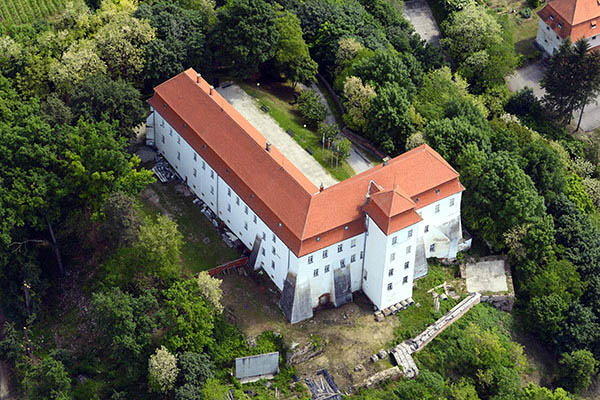
- From top, left to right: Overview of Lendava, St. Catherine's Church, Synagogue, Old manor, Lendava Castle

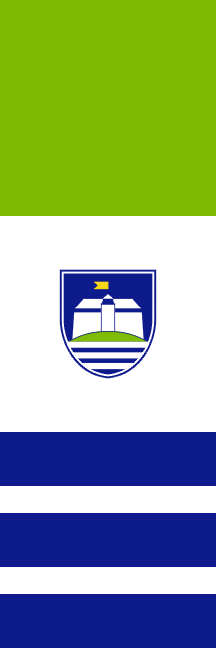
- Flag Coat of arms

- Location in Slovenia
- Coordinates: 46°33′47″N 16°27′7″E
- Country: Slovenia
- Traditional region: Prekmurje
- Statistical region: Mura
- Municipality: Lendava

Area
  - Total: 5.66 km^{2} (2.19 sq mi)
- Elevation: 161.1 m (529 ft)

Population (2019)
  - Total: 2,942
- Vehicle registration: MS

Lendava (pronounced [ˈléːndaʋa]; formerly Dolnja Lendava, in older sources also Dolenja Lendava; Hungarian: Lendva, formerly Alsólendva; German: Lindau, formerly Unter-Limbach) is a town in Slovenia in the region of Prekmurje. It is the seat of the Municipality of Lendava. It forms part of the border crossing with Hungary at Dolga Vas–Rédics and it is near the border with Croatia at Mursko Središće. Alongside Slovene, Hungarian serves as an official language of the municipality.

The town is the centre of the Hungarian minority in Slovenia. It is also known for the monumental theater and Hungarian Community Centre designed by the architect Imre Makovecz.

== Name ==
The town is named after the Ledava River; the original nasal in the name of the river was lost in Slovene, but the n in the name of the town was preserved due to Hungarian influence. The former name of the town, Dolnja Lendava (literally, 'lower Lendava'), contrasted with that of Gornja Lendava (literally 'upper Lendava'). The name of the settlement was changed from Dolnja Lendava to Lendava in 1955.

== History ==
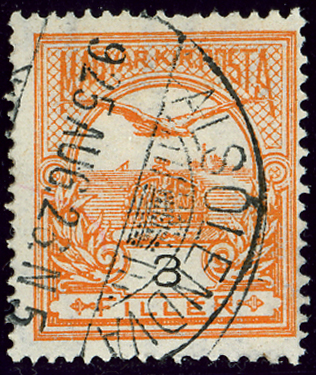
Hungarian stamp and name still in use in 1925

Alsólendva was a district (Hungarian: járás) of the Zala comitat in the Kingdom of Hungary until 1918. It was part of Hungary again from 1941 to 1945.

== Jewish community ==
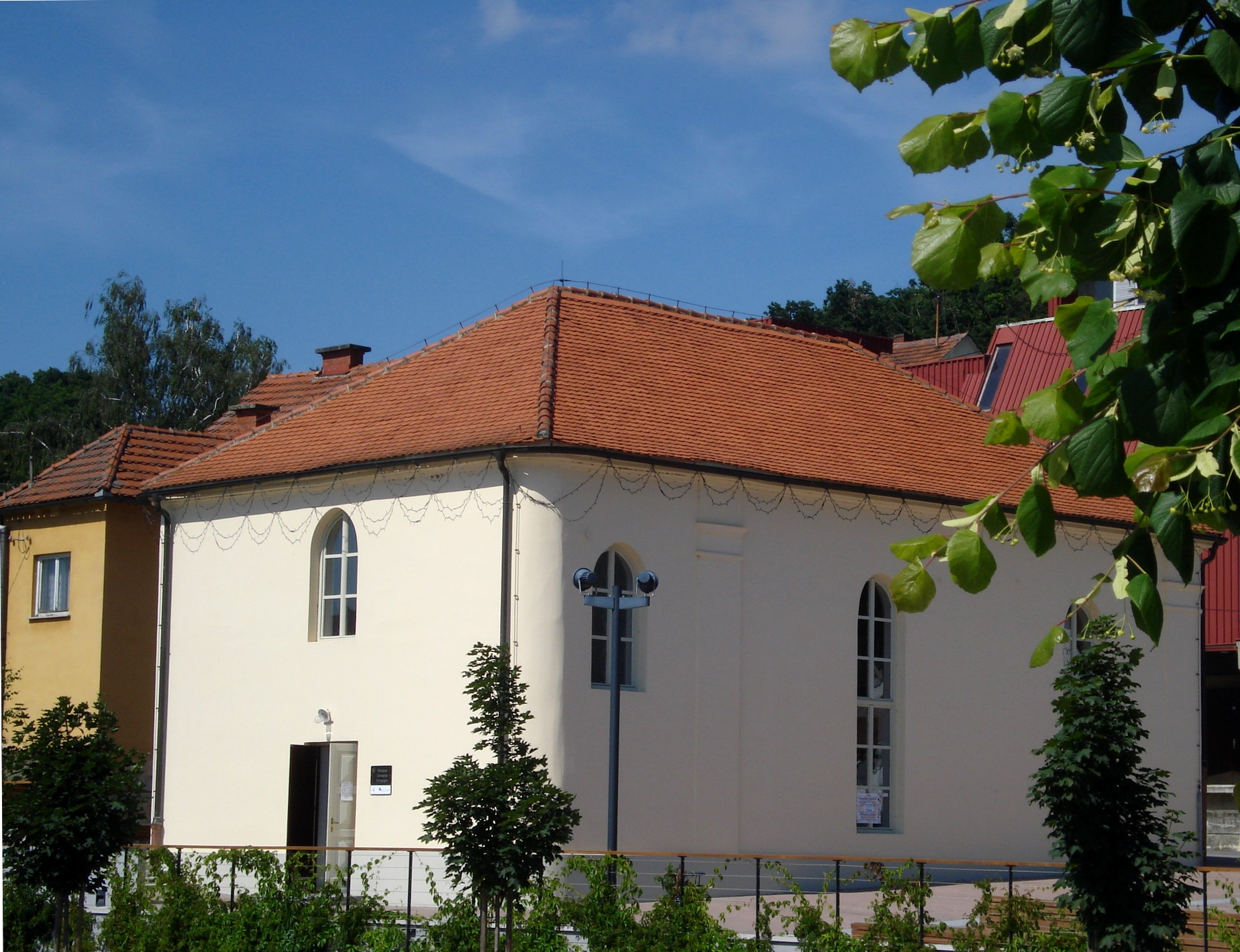
Lendava Synagogue

The first census of the population in the beginning of the 18th century mentions two Jewish merchants, and the following censuses showed an increasing Jewish population composed of merchants, innkeepers, distillers, mead producers, lawyers, and physicians. They played an important role in the economy of Lendava, owning a local hotel, a few pubs, and stores. Local Jews also started the first bank in Lendava. A Jewish school opened in 1850 and it was active until 1921. The last rabbi in Lendava was Mor Lowy.

The synagogue in Lendava is one of only two synagogues left in Slovenia.

== Geography ==
=== Climate ===
The meteorological station is a climatic station and is one of 17 of its kind in the country. The station in Lendava is at an altitude of 190 m and is located on a sloping hillside. The surrounding area includes neighbouring houses with outbuildings, vineyards, trees, gardens and meadows. The station has been at this location since January 1962.

Lendava has a humid continental climate (Dfb) using the 0°C isotherm or an oceanic climate (Cfb) using the -3°C isotherm.

With an annual precipitation of 796 millimetres (31.3 in), Lendava is one of the driest towns in the country; in general this is true for the whole of Prekmurje.

Since records began, Lendava has had a White Christmas on 12 occasions: 1963, 1968, 1969, 1970, 1978, 1981, 1984, 1994, 1996, 1999, 2001 and 2007. The thickest snow cover for a Christmas Day was in 1963 at 40 centimetres (16 in).

Climate data for Lendava (193m elev.) [1962-2022]
Month	Jan	Feb	Mar	Apr	May	Jun	Jul	Aug	Sep	Oct	Nov	Dec	Year
Record high °C (°F)	18.5 (65.3)	22.3 (72.1)	25.0 (77.0)	29.3 (84.7)	32.8 (91.0)	35.5 (95.9)	38.1 (100.6)	38.2 (100.8)	33.2 (91.8)	27.7 (81.9)	23.8 (74.8)	21.0 (69.8)	38.2 (100.8)
Mean daily maximum °C (°F)	3.56 (38.41)	6.44 (43.59)	11.41 (52.54)	16.7 (62.1)	21.59 (70.86)	24.92 (76.86)	26.78 (80.20)	26.39 (79.50)	22.11 (71.80)	16.42 (61.56)	9.51 (49.12)	4.57 (40.23)	15.87 (60.56)
Daily mean °C (°F)	−0.2 (31.6)	1.99 (35.58)	6.19 (43.14)	11.02 (51.84)	15.68 (60.22)	18.95 (66.11)	20.46 (68.83)	19.85 (67.73)	15.84 (60.51)	10.71 (51.28)	5.47 (41.85)	1.06 (33.91)	10.59 (51.05)
Mean daily minimum °C (°F)	−3.58 (25.56)	−2.01 (28.38)	1.37 (34.47)	5.61 (42.10)	9.89 (49.80)	13.37 (56.07)	14.84 (58.71)	14.44 (57.99)	10.85 (51.53)	6.13 (43.03)	2.11 (35.80)	−2.02 (28.36)	5.92 (42.65)
Record low °C (°F)	−23.4 (−10.1)	−23.8 (−10.8)	−25.0 (−13.0)	−4.5 (23.9)	−1.7 (28.9)	2.4 (36.3)	4.4 (39.9)	4.4 (39.9)	−0.6 (30.9)	−7.9 (17.8)	−15.2 (4.6)	−21.3 (−6.3)	−25.0 (−13.0)
Average precipitation mm (inches)	41.53 (1.64)	42.47 (1.67)	44.89 (1.77)	55.9 (2.20)	78.48 (3.09)	86.09 (3.39)	91.15 (3.59)	82.97 (3.27)	82.2 (3.24)	65.83 (2.59)	72.31 (2.85)	52.14 (2.05)	795.96 (31.35)
Average extreme snow depth cm (inches)	13.93 (5.48)	14.74 (5.80)	9.04 (3.56)	2.0 (0.8)	0.0 (0.0)	0.0 (0.0)	0.0 (0.0)	0.0 (0.0)	0.0 (0.0)	0.0 (0.0)	9.19 (3.62)	10.92 (4.30)	14.74 (5.80)
Average precipitation days (≥ 0.1 mm)	7.41	7.49	7.95	9.49	11.03	11.03	10.17	9.31	8.46	8.06	8.97	8.61	107.98
Average rainy days (≥ 0.1 mm)	4.34	4.38	6.19	9.34	11.03	10.88	10.17	9.18	8.46	8.03	8.29	6.3	96.59
Average snowy days (≥ 0.1 mm)	3.62	3.47	2.22	0.36	0.0	0.0	0.0	0.0	0.0	0.04	1.07	2.82	13.6
Average relative humidity (%)	83.8	77.71	72.24	70.02	71.63	72.94	72.72	75.1	79.58	82.18	85.37	85.95	77.44
Average afternoon relative humidity (%)	75.39	65.76	57.63	54.71	55.31	56.32	54.2	55.36	60.75	65.92	75.0	78.73	62.92
Source: National Meteorological Service of Slovenia – Archive

Historical population
Year	Pop.	±%
1948	1,680	—
1953	2,495	+48.5%
1961	2,561	+2.6%
1971	3,044	+18.9%
1981	3,733	+22.6%
1991	3,817	+2.3%
2002	3,395	−11.1%
2011	3,129	−7.8%
2021	2,947	−5.8%
Population size may be affected by changes in administrative divisions.

== Landmarks ==
=== Church ===
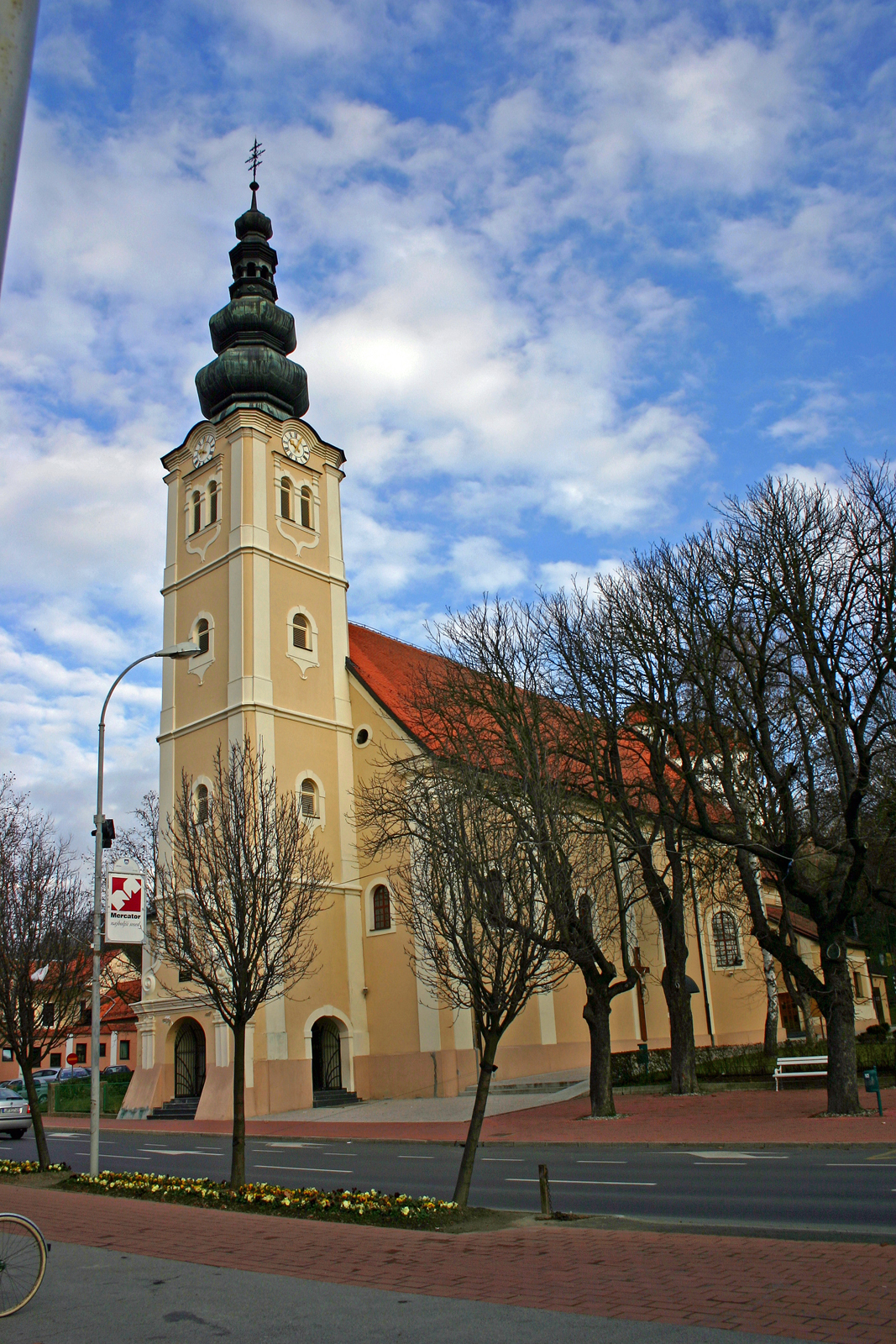
Parish church in Lendava

The parish church in the settlement is dedicated to Saint Catherine of Alexandria and belongs to the Roman Catholic Diocese of Murska Sobota. There is also a Lutheran church in the town. It was built in 1931.

=== Castle ===
Lendava Castle is a former property of the Esterházy family. The mainly 18th-century building stands on a hill above the town centre and contains a museum and a gallery.

== Twin towns – Sister cities ==
Lendava is twinned with:

- Zalaegerszeg, Hungary

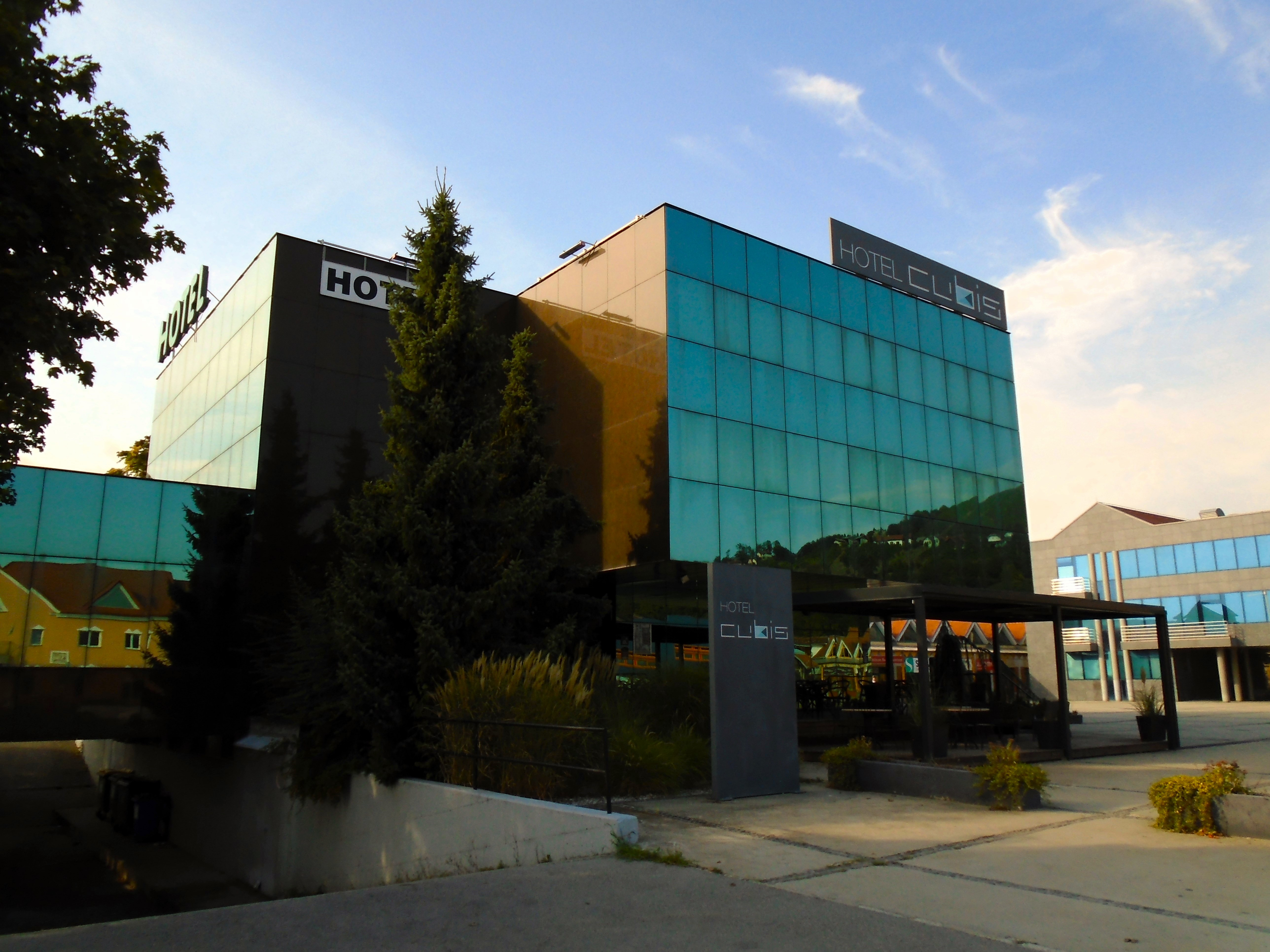
Cubis Hotel in Lendava

== Sport ==
Petišovci Stadium is a purpose built motorcycle speedway stadium located east of Petišovci, off the Rudarska ulica. The facility hosts the Športno Društvo Lendava team and has been a significant venue for speedway hosting important events, including qualifying rounds of the Speedway World Championship.
