= Bible translations into Slovene =

Translations of the Bible into Slovene

Dalmatin's Bible

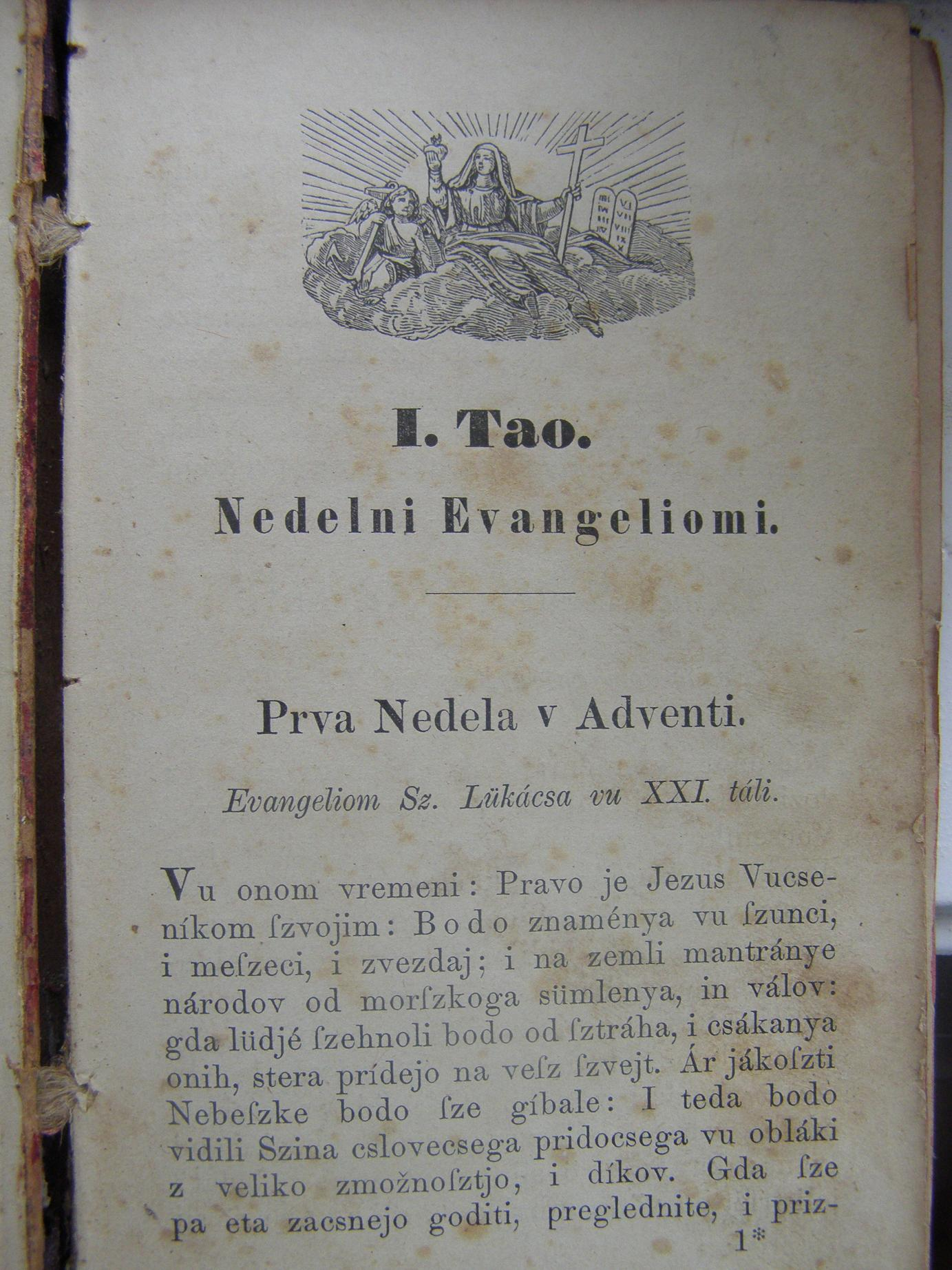
Catholic version by Mikloš Küzmič.

The first translation of a sentence from the Bible (Mt 25:34) to Slovene appeared in the Freising Manuscripts, dating to the 10th or the 11th century. The versions of the Bible for Slovenes are most closely connected with the activity of the Reformer of Carniola, Primož Trubar and his associates and successors. They were intended for the Protestant Slovenes. Trubar translated the Gospel of Matthew, which was printed at Reutlingen in 1555. He later translated the New Testament, publishing the first part in 1557 at Tübingen, the second part in 1560, and the last part in 1577. The complete New Testament was reissued in 1582. The Psalms appeared in 1566.

Jurij Dalmatin, who was mentored by Trubar, translated the Old Testament and an edition of the entire Scriptures into Slovene. This was published under his direction at Wittenberg in 1583. István Küzmics published a New Testament for the Hungarian Slovenes (Nouvi Zákon) in the Prekmurje Slovene at Halle in 1771. Miklós Küzmics published the catholic version (Szvéti evangyeliomi, Summa sztároga i nouvoga testamentoma szvéte histórie). An edition published at Kőszeg (Guns) in 1848 includes the Psalms (Knige 'zoltárszke), from Sándor Terplán and the translation of Moses's books and Josua's book (Moses i Josua) in 1929 from János Kardos. Other Prekmurje translators were István Szelmár, Péter Kollár, and János Szlepecz.

In 1784, part of the New Testament for use by Roman Catholics was printed at Ljubljana after being translated from the Vulgate by several hands. The second part of the New Testament was issued in 1786, and the Old Testament between 1791 and 1802.

== Translators ==
- Jurij Dalmatin: Protestant, translated into Slovene
- Primož Trubar: Lutheran, translated into Slovene
- Jurij Japelj: Catholic, translated into Slovene
- Josip Stritar: Protestant, translated into Slovene

== See also ==
- Bible translations into Prekmurje Slovene
