= Bible translations into Slavic languages =

The history of all Bible translations into Slavic languages begins with Bible translations into Church Slavonic. Other languages include:

== East Slavic ==
=== Ruthenian ===
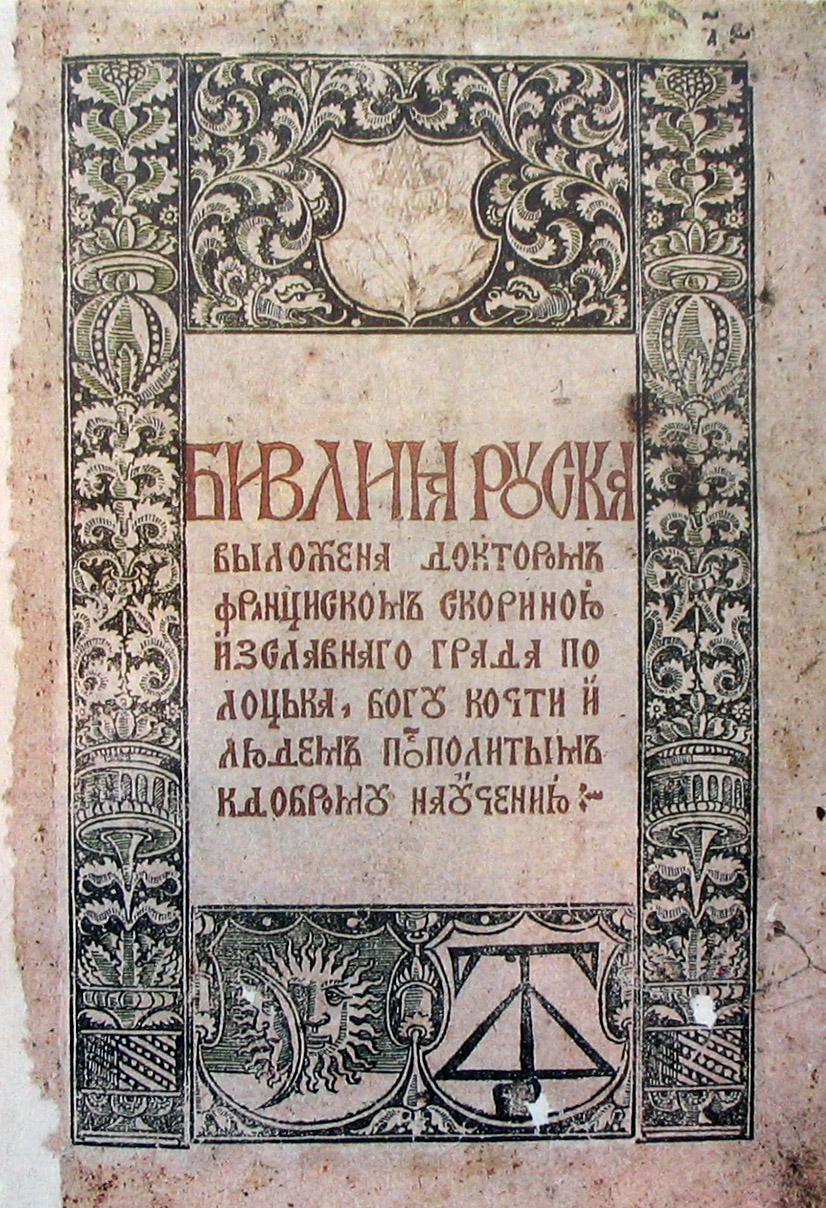
Bible, published by Francysk Skaryna

An effort to produce a version in the vernacular was made by Francysk Skaryna (d. after 1535), a native of Polatsk in Belarus. He published at Prague, 1517–19, twenty-two Old Testament books in Ruthenian language, in the preparation of which he was greatly influenced by the Bohemian Bible of 1506. Other efforts were made during the 16th and 17th centuries, but the Church Slavonic predominated in all these efforts.

=== Russian ===
See also: Archangel Gospel, Russian. And The Four Gospels (Russian: Четвероевангелие, romanized: Chetveroevangelie) by Pyotr Mstislavets (1574–1575)

=== Ukrainian ===
The known history of the Bible translation into Ukrainian began in the 16th century (between 1556 and 1561) with Peresopnytsia Gospels, which included only four Gospels of the New Testament.

== South Slavic ==
=== Bulgarian ===
The royal Tetraevangelia of Ivan Alexander is an illuminated manuscript Gospel Book in Middle Bulgarian, prepared and illustrated in 1355–1356 for Tsar Ivan Alexander of the Second Bulgarian Empire. The manuscript is regarded as one of the most important manuscripts of medieval Bulgarian culture.

The manuscript, now in the British Library (Add. MS 39627), contains the text of the Four Gospels illustrated with 366 miniatures and consists of 286 parchment folios, 33 by 24.3 cm in size.

But in the main, the Bulgarian Orthodox church continued to use the Old Church Slavonic until the 1940s. In 1835 the British and Foreign Bible Society contracted a Bulgarian monk, Neofit Rilski, who started on a new translation which, in later editions, remains the standard version today.

=== Macedonian ===
Early history of Macedonian translations are closely linked with translations into Bulgarian dialects from 1852. The whole Bible (including the Deuterocanonical books) translated in Macedonian by the Archbishop Gavril was printed in 1990.

=== Bosnian ===
There have been at least 5 different attempts in recent years to translate the Bible into Bosnian.

1. In 1999 a project was established by a group calling itself the "Bible Society of the Federation of Bosnia and Hercegovina" with the plan to translate the Bible into Bosnian, currently based on a text from the Croatian Bible Society.
2. The New Testament was adapted from Croatian by a group led by Ruben Knežević, and published by Zenica Home Press in 2002.
3. A group called Bosanska Biblija created a Bible translation for a Muslim Bosniak audience, which was published by Grafotisak Grude in 2013. Official founder of the Bosnian Bible Translation Project is Stuart Moses Graham, the executive director of the Friends of Bosnia and Croatia in Northern Ireland, a trust based in Belfast (formerly a charity called Church Growth Croatia and Bosnia), and the initiator, editor and distributor of the first Bosnian Bible is Dr Redžo Trako, a Bosniak scholar of Islamic religious background with a PhD from the Queen's University Belfast. Although the original idea of translating the Bible into Bosnian actually was born in the Belfast Bible College, where Dr Trako once was the only foreign student without the Bible in his mother tongue, the whole process of making the first Bosnian Bible took place in Bosnia and Herzegovina alone, including translation, checking, proofreading, editing, printing, publishing and distribution.
4. Krstjanska zajednica u Bosni i Hercegovini (Christian community in Bosnia and Herzegovina) led by Antti Tepponen and known as "Tuzla translation" published a new translation of the whole Bible in 2021. Translation was started in 2001. The New Testament and Psalms were published 2009 - 2013. The Pentateuch was published in 2016 and the whole Bible in 2021 as "Biblija, Stari i Novi zavjet". The translation is available online both in text and audio format.
5. Today's Bosnian Version (TBV): this project, led by Daniel Andrić, was focused on providing a more modern and accessible version of the Bible in Bosnian.

=== Slovene ===
The first translation of a sentence from the Bible (Mt 25:34) to Slovene appeared in the Freising Manuscripts, dating to the 10th or the 11th century. The first integral translation of part of the Bible was made in 1555 by the Protestant writer Primož Trubar (the Gospel of Matthew), who until 1577 published in several parts the translation of the entire New Testament (republished in entirety in 1582). Based on his work and the work of Martin Luther, the Protestant Jurij Dalmatin translated from c. 1569 until 1578 the entire Bible to Slovene. His work was printed only in 1583 in Wittenberg and sent home to Carniola illegally in boxes and barrels.

==== Prekmurje Slovene ====
István Küzmics and Miklós Küzmics translated the Bible into the Prekmurje Slovene of Slovene: (Nouvi Zákon, Szvéti evangyeliomi).

== West Slavic ==
=== Polish ===
Bible translations into Polish date to the 13th century. The first full translations were completed in the 16th century. Today the official Catholic and most popular Bible in Poland is the Millennium Bible (Polish: Biblia Tysiąclecia), first published in 1965.

=== Kashubian ===
The known history of the Bible translation into Kashubian began in the 16th century with Szimón Krofey. Four Gospels of the New Testament has been translated into Kashubian by Franciszek Grucza — Kaszëbskô Biblëjô; Nowi Testament; IV Ewanjelje, Poznań 1992. Other important publications include Ewanielie na kaszëbsczi tłomaczoné (2010), Knéga Zôczątków (2015) — the Book of Genesis, Knéga Wińdzeniô (2016) — the Book of Exodus, Knéga Kapłańskô (2017), Knéga Lëczbów (2018), Knéga Pòwtórzonégò Prawa (2019) translated by Adam R. Sikora.

=== Czech ===
The first translation of the Book of Psalms was done before 1300. The first translation of the whole Bible into Czech, based on the Latin Vulgate, was done around 1360. The first printed Bible was published in 1488 (the Prague Bible). The first translation from the original languages (Hebrew, Aramaic and Greek) was the Kralice Bible from 1579, the definitive edition published in 1613. The Bible of Kralice was and remains in wide use. Among modern translations the Ecumenical Version of 1979 is commonly used. The newest translation in modern Czech was completed in 2009.

=== Silesian ===
- Biblia Ślązoka
- New Testament in Silesian

== See also ==
- List of Bible translations by language
