= Szvéti evangyeliomi =

Slovene-language Bible translation

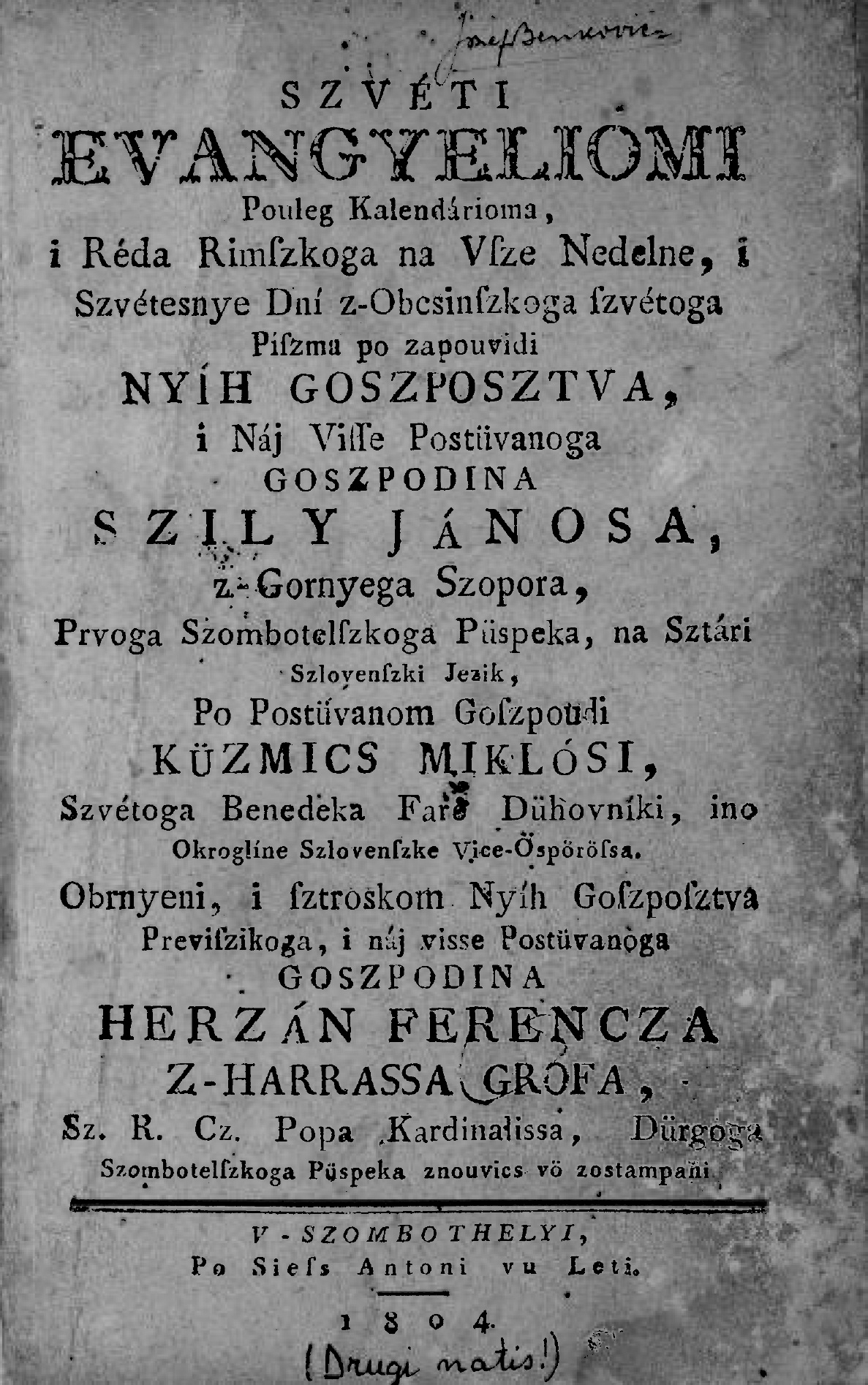
Szvéti evangyeliomi, 1804

Szvéti evangyeliomi (The Holy Gospels), later Szvéti evangeliomi, is the first Catholic translation of the Bible into Prekmurje Slovene. It was written by Miklós Küzmics (1737–1804), the dean of Prekmurje and the Rába Valley. The publication in 1780 was financed by János Szily, the first bishop of Szombathely. Szvéti evangyéliomi had a significant role in the formation of standard Prekmurje Slovene. It was a standard for numerous works published in Prekmurje from 1780 until 1920.

Küzmics began his work in 1763. However, he did not receive support from the bishop of Győr. When István Küzmics's Protestant translation, Nouvi Zákon, was published, he was greatly disappointed. Slovene Catholics had to read Protestant books because they did not have their own. Küzmics called for bishops to take action against the "heretical" New Testament.

For a long time it was thought that Küzmics had copied his text from Nouvi Zákon. However, despite some similarities, the texts are different. Miklós Küzmics translated the Kajkavian Szveti evangeliomi by Nikola Krajačević, which was used in Prekmurje and the Rába Valley, Haloze, the Slovene Hills, and Prlekija. István Küzmics also used Krajačević's gospels as a source, but in his Nouvi Zákon Kajkavian elements are very strong. Anton Vratuša concluded that Miklós tried to use more original Prekmurje dialect words. Nouvi Zákon was only a secondary source, from which he did not translate.

== See also ==
- Bible translations into Slavic languages
- Bible translations into Slovene
