= Mihály Gáber =

Slovene Roman Catholic priest and writer

Mihály Gáber (Slovene: Miháo Gaber; c. 1753 – 13 September 1815) was a Slovenian Roman Catholic priest, a writer, and close associate of Miklós Küzmics. Küzmics standardized Prekmurje Slovene with Gáber's assistance.

Gáber was born in Dolnji Slaveči and became friends with Küzmics in his childhood. He was ordained a priest in 1777 in Szombathely. In September and December that year he served as an administrator in Pertoča, and in 1778 and 1779 he was a curate in Gornji Petrovci. He served as the parish priest of Martjanci until his death.

Gáber assisted Küzmics's literary efforts. Küzmics wrote the first Catholic books in the Prekmurje dialect and tried to use less foreign (primarily Kajkavian) words. Through Gáber, many elements from the dialect used in the Parish of Martjanci were transferred to the standard language. János Szily, the Bishop of Szombathely, encouraged the pair to translate the Bible.

Gáber also wrote some Catholic hymns in the Prekmurje dialect.

== See also ==
- List of Slovene writers and poets in Hungary

== Literature ==
- Géfin Gyula: A szombathelyi egyházmegye története III. (1935)
- Jožef Smej: Martjanska župnija v perspektivi 600 let.
