= Nouvi Zákon =

New Testament translation into Slovene

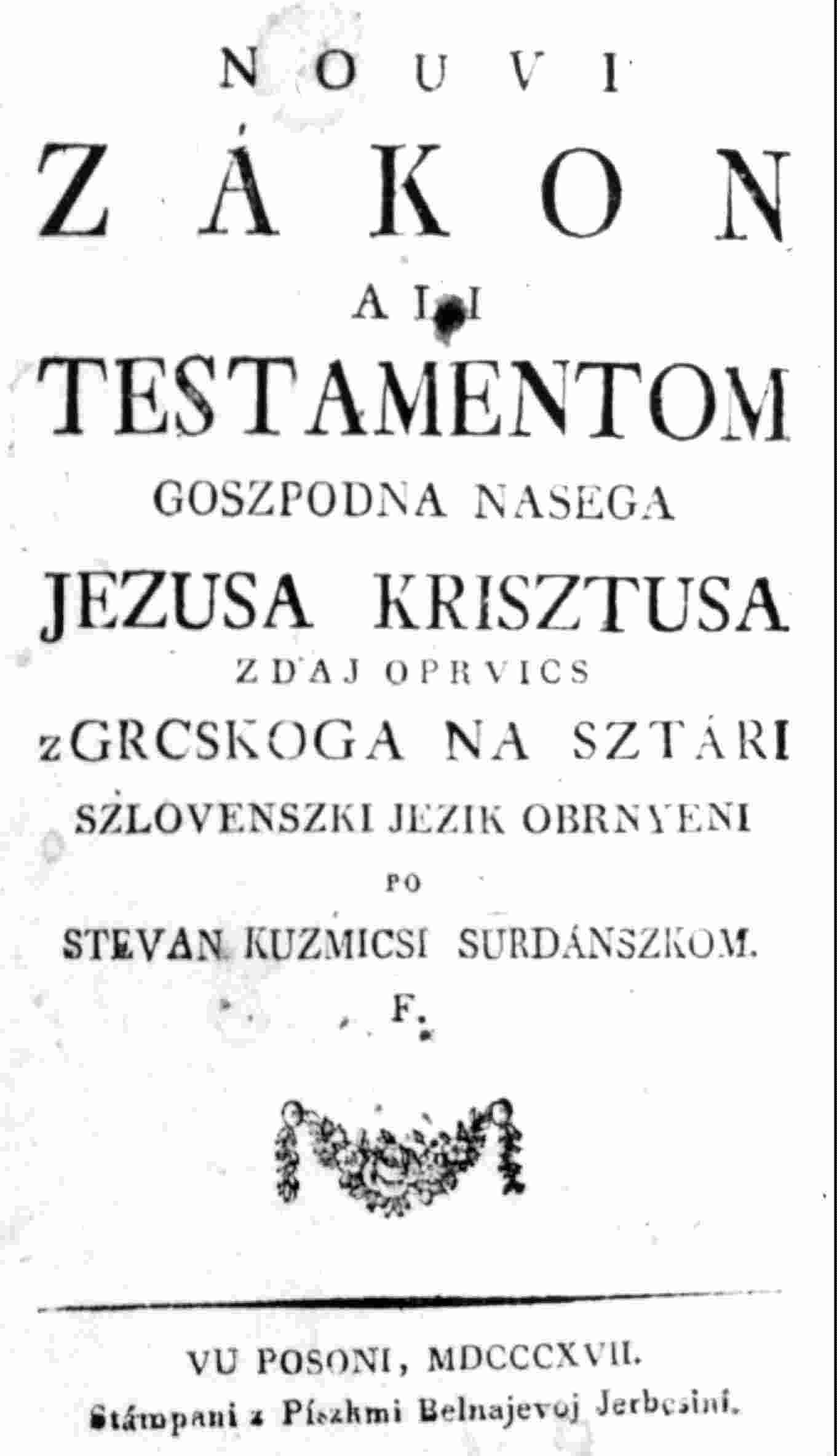
Second edition of Nouvi Zákon (1817).

Nouvi Zákon (New Testament) is the best-known work of the Hungarian Slovene writer István Küzmics. Nouvi Zákon is a translation of the New Testament into the Prekmurje Slovene dialect. This text and Miklós Küzmics's Szvéti Evangyeliomi are the most important works in standard Prekmurje Slovene.

== The prologue (Predgovor) ==
Küzmics published Nouvi Zákon in 1771 in Halle, Saxony-Anhalt, with the assistance of Hungarian and Slovene Lutherans (Nouvi Zákon ali Testamentim Goszpodna Nasega Jezusa Krisztusa zdaj oprvics zGrcskoga na sztári szlovenszki jezik obrnyeni po Stevan Küzmicsi Surdánszkom f.).

There is dispute as to whether the prologue (Predgovor), was written by Küzmics or by some other person. One other possible author is the Hungarian Lutheran pastor József Torkos. Torkos evidently wrote the prologue in Latin and Küzmics in turn translated it into the Prekmurje dialect. This question was raised by the Slovene writer Mihály Bakos, who followed Küzmics as head of the Lutheran Parish of Surd.

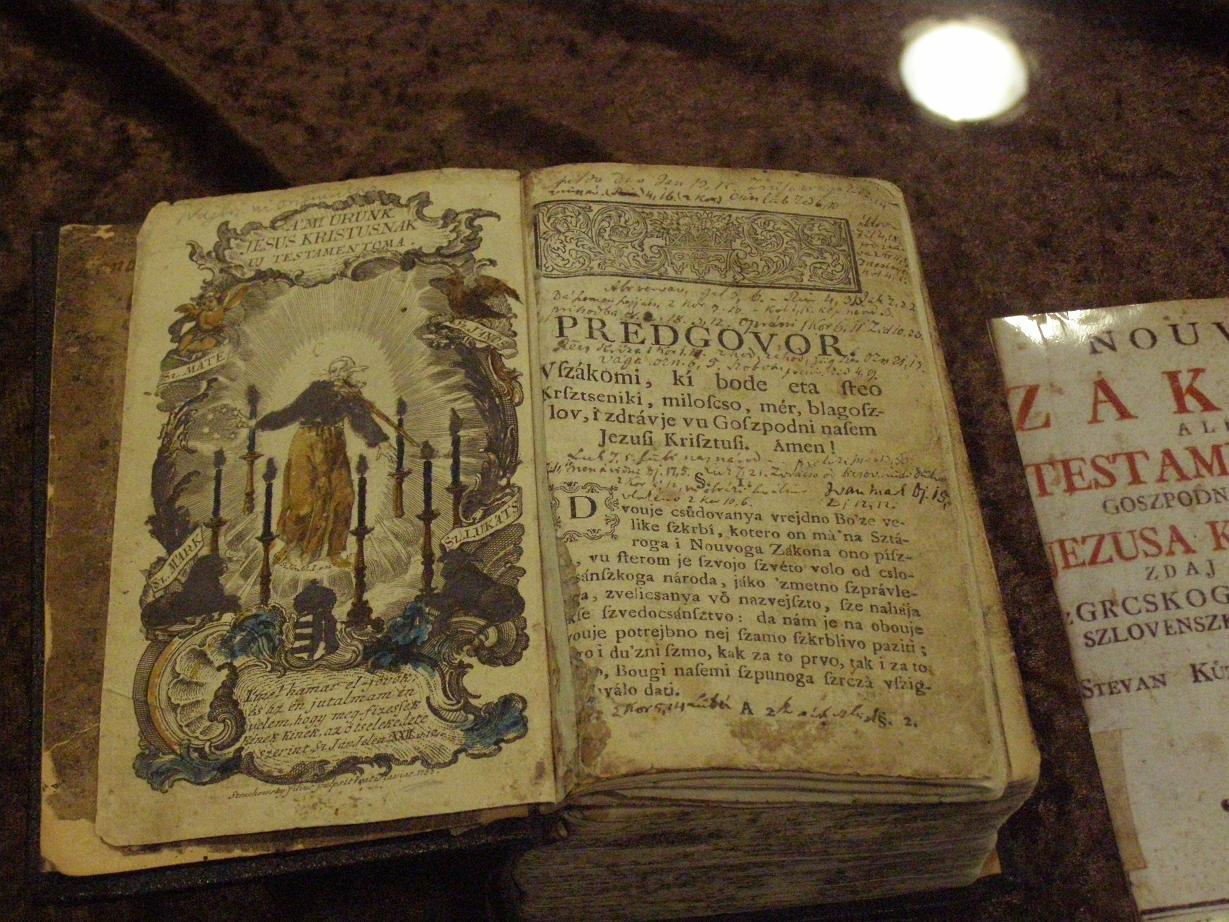
Original edition in the Murska Sobota library

== The language ==
István Küzmics translated Nouvi Zákon from Greek, (zGrcskoga na sztári szlovenszki jezik). Küzmics was born in Strukovci in Ravensko, a flatland subregion of Prekmurje, and so Nouvi Zákon was written in his Ravensko dialect. It is similar to Jurij Dalmatin's Bible because numerous terms and idioms are included in Nouvi Zákon. His immediate sources apparently were Kajkavian books. The Bishop of Zagreb in the Middle Ages led the Hungarian Slovenes, and his believers wrote the Kajkavian books. The Old Hymnal of Martjanci was also used as a Kajkavian source, and so the Prekmurje dialect bears similarities to Kajkavian features.

The Catholic pastor Miklós Küzmics used Nouvi Zákon when he translated the Catholic Gospel. Nouvi Zákon, Miklós Küzmics's Szvéti evangyeliomi, and József Borovnyák's Kniga molitvena (Old Slovene Prayer Book) are significant texts in Slovene and South Slavic literature.

== Editions ==
- Nouvi Zákon ali Testamentom Goszpodna Nasega Jezusa Krisztusa zdaj oprvics zGrcskoga na sztrái szlovenszki jezik obrnyeni po Stevan Kuzmicsi surdánszkom f. (1817, Bratislava)
- Nôvi Zákon ali Testamentom Goszpodna Nasega Jezusa Krisztusa zdaj oprvics zGrcskoga na sztári szlovenszki jezik obrnyeni po Küzmics Stevani surdanszkom farari. (Kőszeg, 1848, Sándor Terplán created the second edition).
- Nôvi Zákon ali Testamentom Goszpodna Nasega Jezus Krisztusa szlovencseni po Küzmics Stevani surdanszkom dühovniki. Vödáni po Angluskom i zvönésnyem tüváristvi za Biblie. (1883, Vienna)
- Nôvi Zákon ali Testamentom Goszpodna Nasega Jezus Krisztusa szlovencseni po Küzmics Stevani surdanszkom dühovniki. Vödáni po angluskom i zvönésnyem tüváristvi za Biblie. Izdajanje Britanskog i inostranog biblijsko društva Beograd, 1928. (Belgrade-Zemun)

== See also ==
- Primož Trubar
- Jurij Dalmatin
- Prekmurje
- Bible translations into Prekmurje Slovene
