= Bible translations into Prekmurje Slovene =

The first New Testament in Prekmurje Slovene appeared in 1771: the Nouvi Zákon of István Küzmics. This was distinct from Bible translations into Slovene, such as that of Miklós Küzmics.

Between the 16th and 19th centuries there were few literary standards for Slovene in Styria, Carniola, Carinthia, Hungary, and the Slovenian Littoral. Primož Trubar published the fully translations of the books in the New Testament, Jurij Dalmatin the full Bible. Other regional standards did not produce more experiments, only the Prekmurje Slovene spoken in Hungary.

== First experiments ==
The Hungarian Slovenes also knew the central Slovene books and Dalmatin's Bible, but hardly understood the central Slovene. They also used a few Kajkavian books. In the 16th century, writers experimented with a separate Prekmurje written standard and the Old Hymnal of Martjanci (the second book) contained Psalms (Žoltárje, 30, 23, 14, 95, 146, 133, 12, 42, 46), mostly adaptations from Kajkavian Croatian.

Psalmus XXX.

Vu tebe ſe vüpam Goſzpodne
i da ne bom ospotan veko vekomna
Zakai tvoja pravicza oſzlobodi mene.
Nagni kmeni ti tvoja vuha
Ar ti mene poſzlünes, moti me
ne zvelicsis.
Ar ſzi ti meni batrivoſzt mo
vupanye. Za tve ime naſziti
mene.

Psalm 31 (30)

O Lord, do I take refuge;
let me never be put to shame;
in your righteousness deliver me!
Incline your ear to me;
rescue me speedily! Be a rock of refuge for me,
a strong fortress to save me!
For you are my rock and my fortress;
and for your name's sake you lead me and guide me;
you take me out of the net they have hidden for me,
for you are my refuge.

The first Kajkavian printed book Postilla from Antun Vramec also have citations from the Gospels. András Rogan, priest of Dekležin (Dokležovje) was transcribe the Postilla, but this manuscript has some Prekmurje Slovene lexemes.

Ferenc Temlin published the first printed book in Prekmurje Slovene in 1715, which was still influenced by Kajkavian. This book contains a few citations and psalms (145, 147). The Abeczedarium Szlowenszko (1725) can be found the fully translation of the 5th, 6th, and 23rd psalms. Although this book also influenced by the Kajkavian, the psalms are adaptations from the Dalmatin's Bible. Mihály Szever Vanecsai in his book Réd zvelicsánsztva translate the 1st, 25th and 32nd. psalms.

== István Küzmics ==
István Küzmics's work the fully translation of the New Testament, the Nouvi Zákon. Küzmics argues, that the Hungarian Slovenes expressly require the Bible in his mother tongue, which is the Hungarian Slovene language (vogrſzki szlovenszki jezik; i.e., the Prekmurje Slovene) because the central Slovene literature was not sufficient. Küzmics's Hungarian patrons also encouraged him to work in the 1750s. Küzmics sought to write in the authentic dialect, but preserved more Kajkavisms and taking words from Central Slovene, German, Latin, Hungarian, Czech, and Slovak.

== Miklós Küzmics ==
Miklós Küzmics Roman Catholic priest from Kajkavian and Latin language translate in the 1760s the Szvéti evangyeliomi (Holy Gospels), the first Catholic Bible translation, but he could not be published. His source was the Kajkavian Szveti evangeliomi from Nikola Krajačević, which was popular book among the Hungarian Slovenes and István Küzmics also used in the translation of the Nouvi Zákon. János Szily, first bishop of Szombathely supported the publication of the Szvéti evangyeliomi and other Küzmics's books.

== Sándor Terplán ==
Sándor Terplán, the priest of Puconci in 1848 was published the third issue of Nouvi Zákon, Nôvi Zákon titled. Terplán replaced the ej, ou diphthongs with ê, ô characters. Terplán also dealt with translating complete Bible: in 1848 published along with the Nôvi Zákon the Book of Psalms (Knige 'zoltárszke) in Prekmurje Slovene. In 1847 published course-book Dvakrat 52 Bibliszke Historie (Twice 52 Histories from the Bible). Terplán died early, so he could not continue the work.

== István Zsemlics ==
According to Božidar Raič, the Catholic priest István Zsemlics wrote a book about the history of the Bible, though the manuscript was never published in print.

== See also ==
- Bible translations into Slovene

== Literature ==
- Marko Jesenšek: Življenje in delo Jožefa Borovnjaka, Maribor 2008.
- Franci Just: Med verzuško in pesmijo, Poezija Prekmurja v prvi polovici 20. stoletja, Murska Sobota Franc-Franc 2000.
- Jožef Smej: Nouvi Zákon Števana Küzmiča (1771) v luči sodobnega ekumenizma, Bogoslovni vestnik 64.
- Jožef Smej: O prevodih psalmov v prekmurščino od martjanske pesmarice II do Pusztaijeve pesmarice 1893, Slavistična revija 53. 2005.
- Jožef Smej: Prevajanje Svetega pisma v stari slovenski jezik, Stopinje 2008.
- Predgovor, Nouvi Zákon, Števan Küzmič, Pokrajinski muzej Murska Sobota, edition: Franc Kuzmič, Murska Sobota 2008. ISBN 978-961-6579-04-9
