= Pashkov House =

Historical building

Coordinates: 55°44′59″N 37°36′30″E

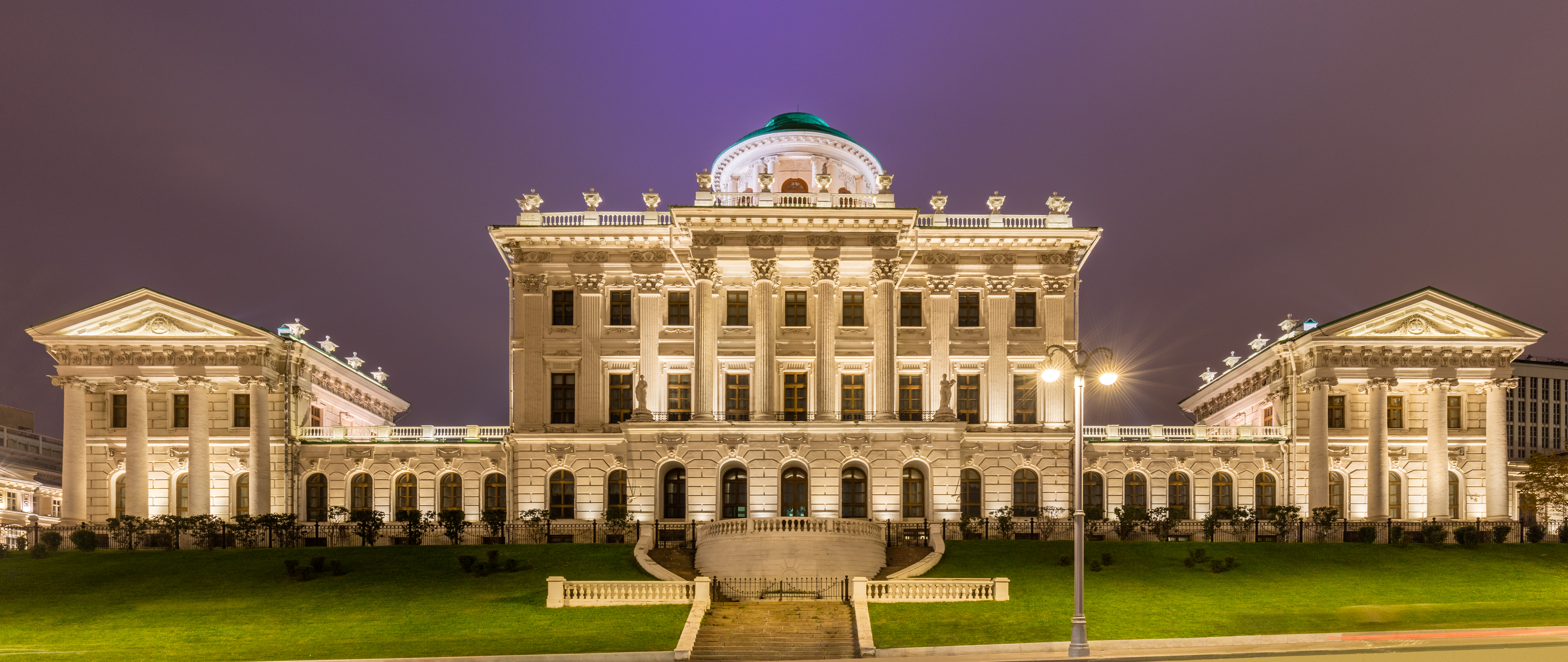
Night view

The Pashkov House (Russian: Пашко́в дом) is a neoclassical mansion that stands on a hill overlooking the western wall of the Moscow Kremlin, near the crossing of the Mokhovaya and Vozdvizhenka streets. Its design has been attributed to Vasily Bazhenov. It used to be home to the Rumyantsev Museum—Moscow's first public museum—in the 19th century. The palace's current owner is the Russian State Library.

== Construction ==
The Pashkov House was erected in 1784—1786 by a Muscovite nobleman, Pyotr Pashkov. He was a retired Captain Lieutenant of the Guards Semenovsky Regiment and the son of Peter the Great's batman.

=== Renown ===
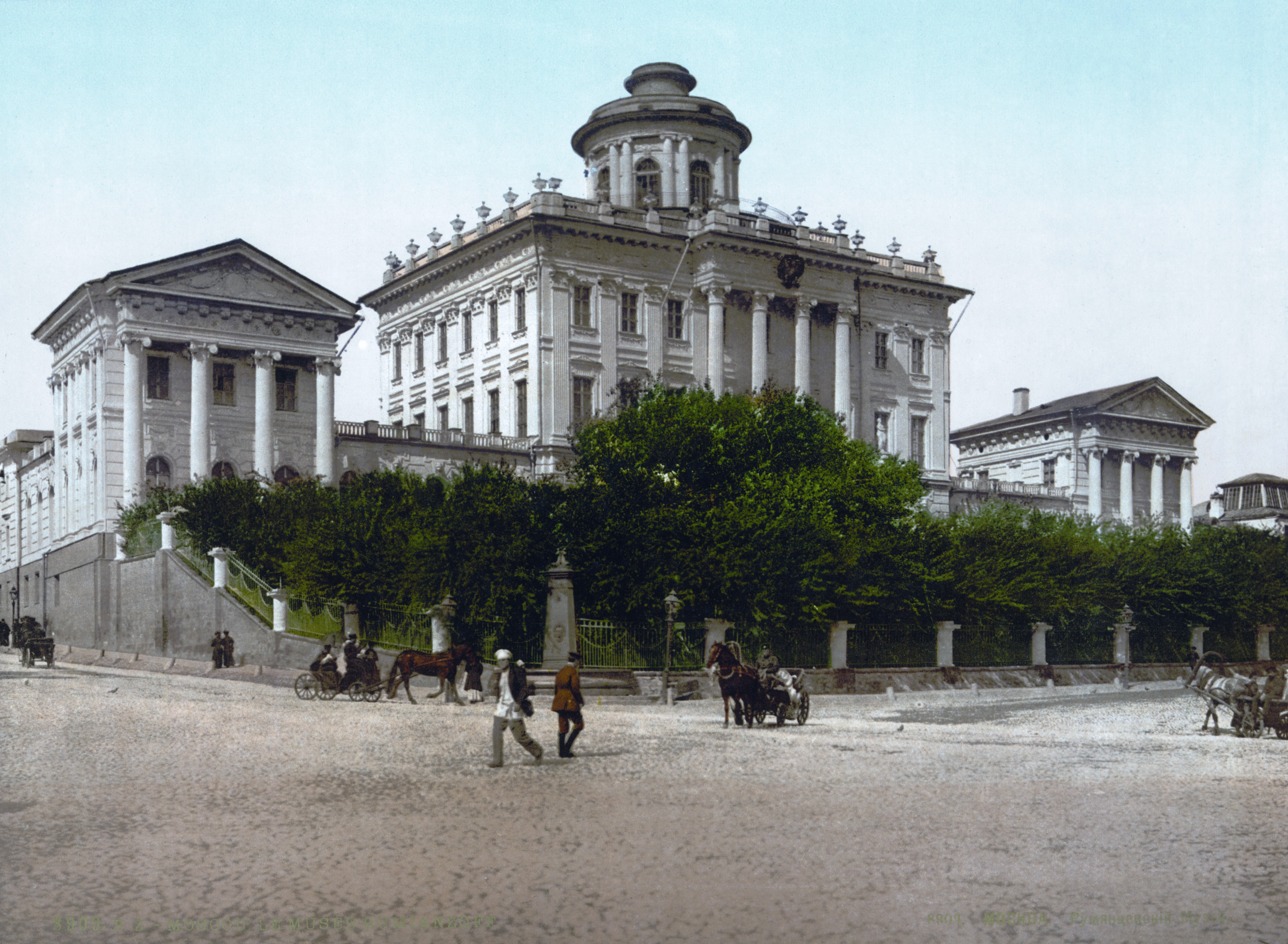
An old postcard

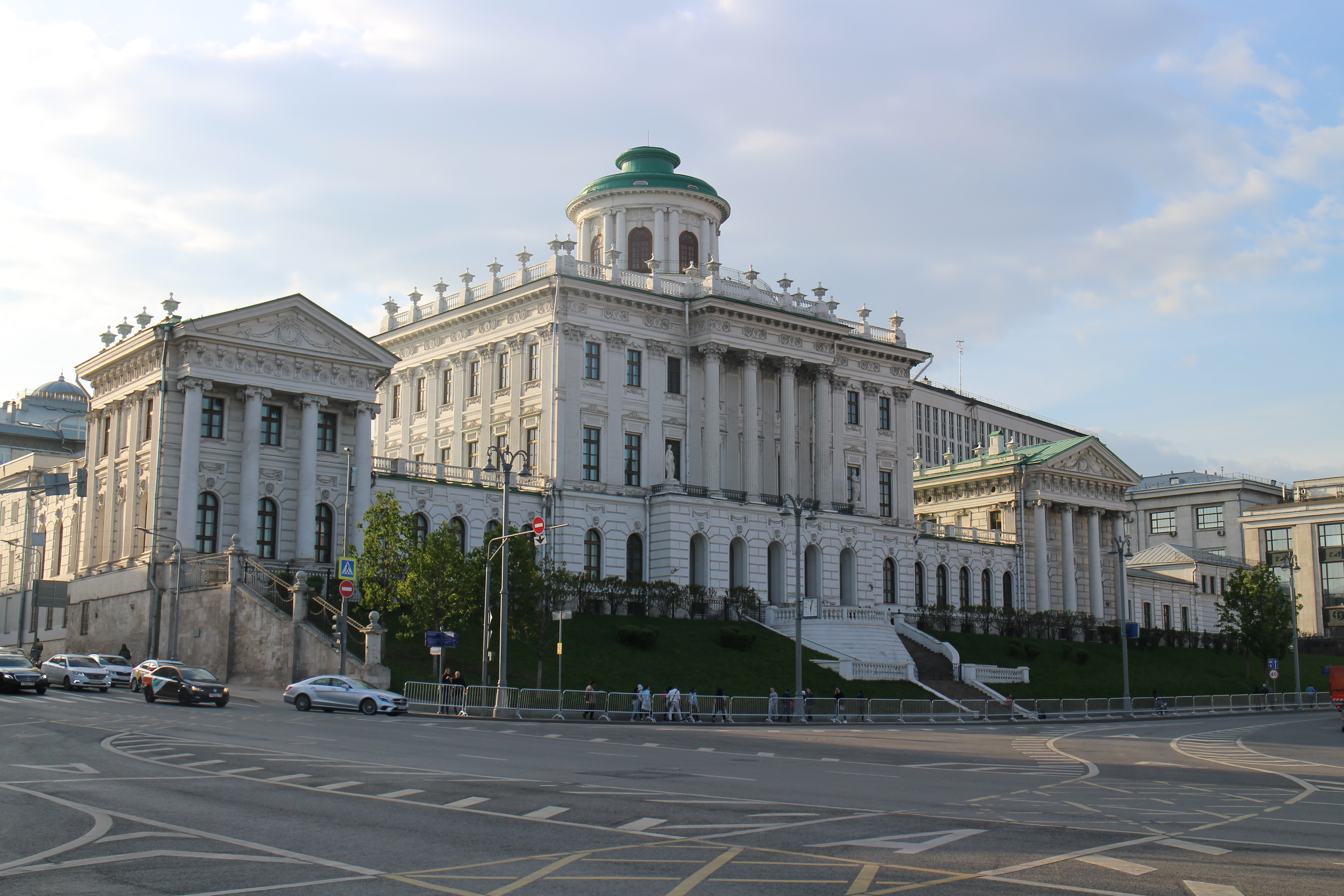
A modern photo

It is one of the key locations described by Mikhail Bulgakov in his novel The Master and Margarita:

"At sunset, high over the city, on the stone terrace of one of the most beautiful houses in Moscow, a house built about a hundred and fifty years ago, there were two: Woland and Azazello. They could not be seen from the street below, because they were hidden from unwanted eyes by a balustrade with plaster vases and plaster flowers. But they could see the city almost to its very edges."

== Owners ==
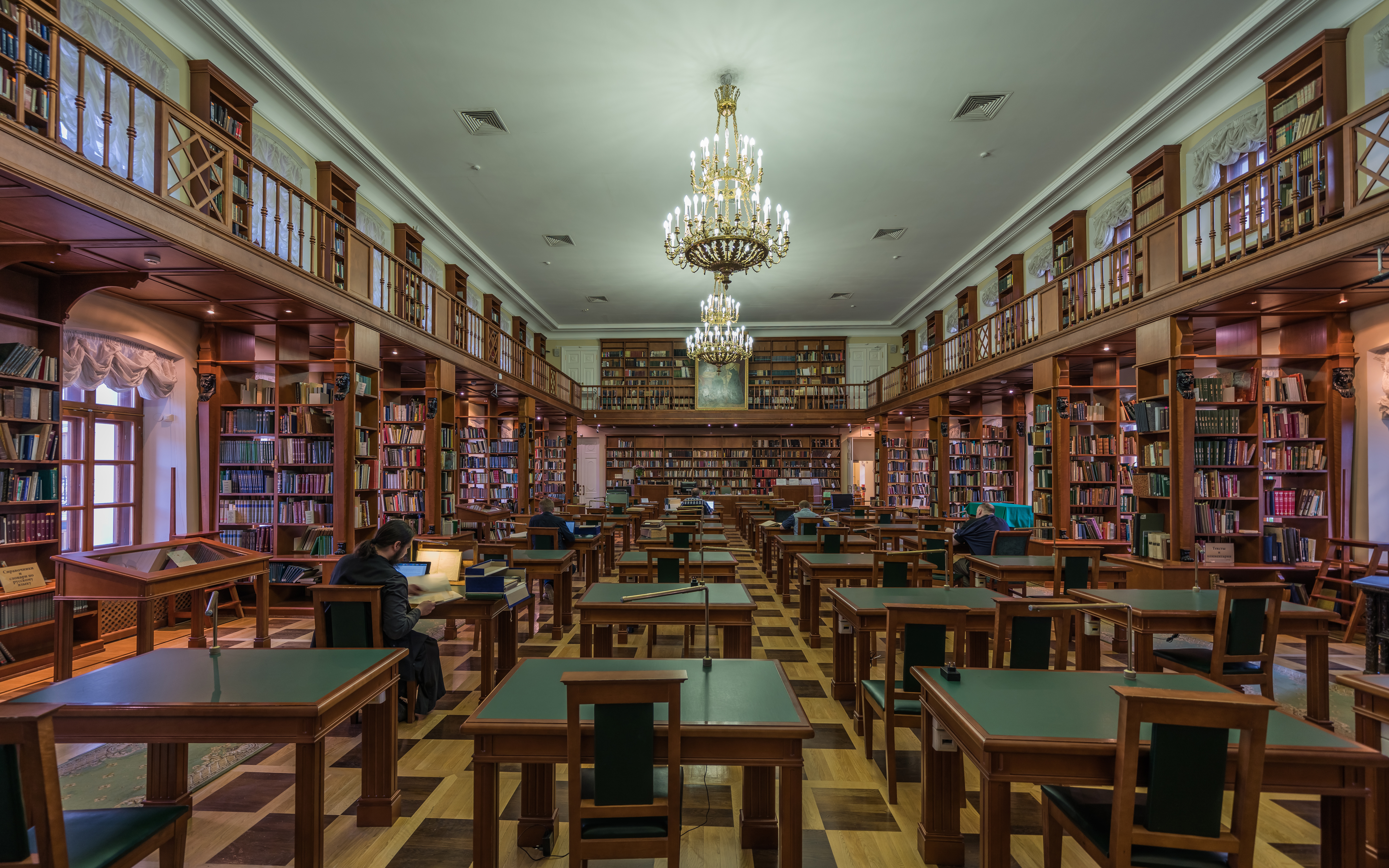
Interior

- The initial owner of the Pashkov house was Pyotr Pashkov, after whom it was named by the Muscovites.
- Upon the death of Pyotr Pashkov and his spouse, the estate passed on to his cousin Aleksandr Pashkov.
- The Pashkov house was purchased by the government for Moscow University in 1839. An Institute for the Nobility (a male boarding school for children of the nobility) was located here in 1843; and later the 4th city grammar school (after 1852).
- The building was transferred to the Rumyantsev Museum to house its collections and library, in 1861.
- In 1921, since more than 400 private libraries were confiscated by the Soviets and added to the Museum, all departments were moved out of the Pashkov House. Only the Museum's library remained there, which was renamed and reorganized into the Lenin Library. At present (2010), the Pashkov House is still among the Library's buildings, but for several decades it was out of use, being under permanent repair, which started in 1988 and ended in 2007. Nowadays, the right wing of the Pashkov House houses the Manuscripts Department, while its left wing houses the Music Department and the Maps Department, of the Russian State Library.

== Description ==
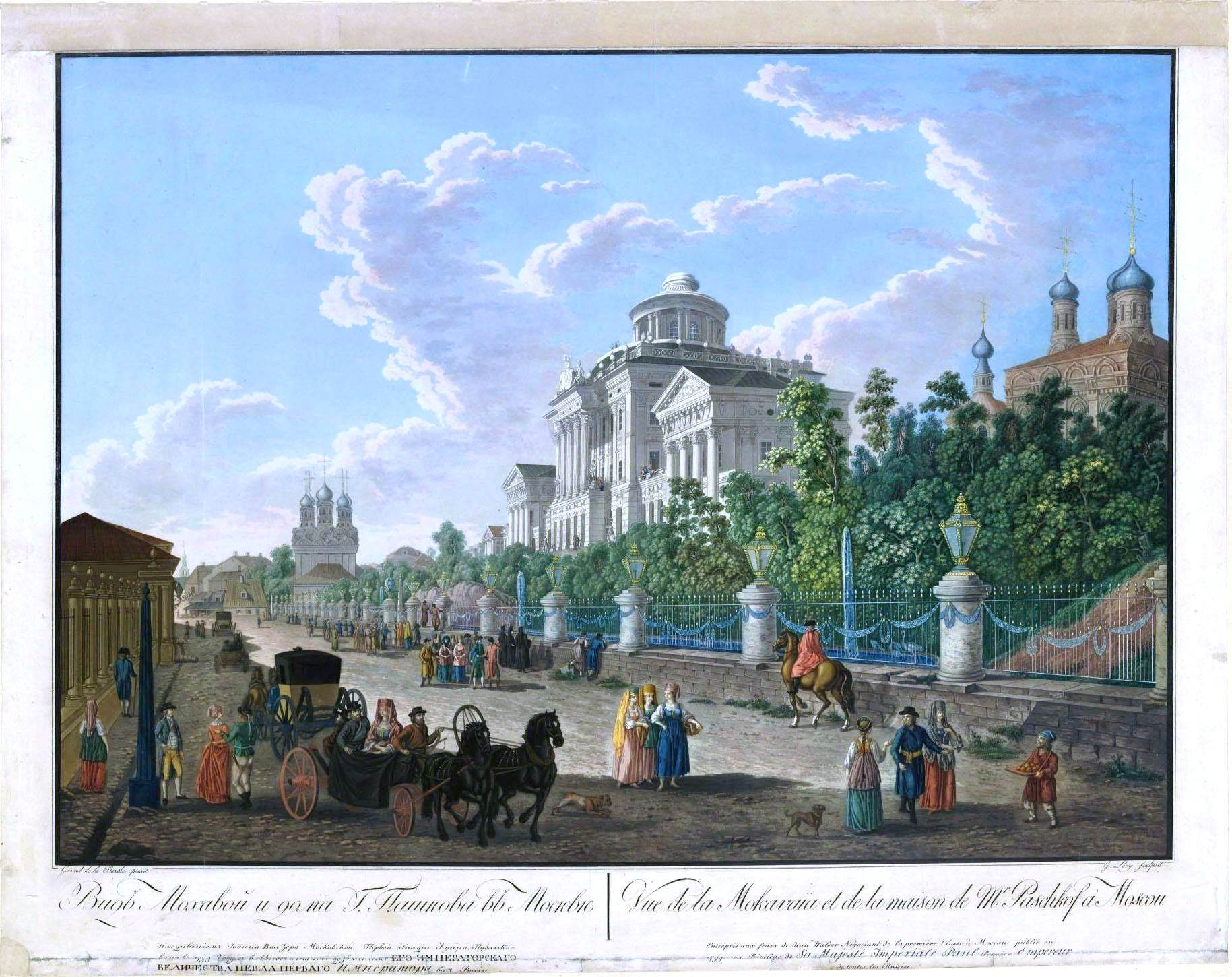
The Pashkov House in the 18th century (a lithograph by Gerard Delabart)

=== Location ===
Interactive map with outline of Pashkov House

The Pashkov House stands on a high Vagankovo hill, as though continuing the line of its ascent, on an open corner of two descending streets.

=== Estate lay-out ===
The mansion, being at the same time a town manor, has a flat-topped lay-out with a court of honor opened towards the entrance.

Lay-out of the garden in front of the building impresses by its splendor:

"There are two stone reservoirs with fountains in the center. A grille of marvelous design separates the house from the street. The garden, same as the pond, swarms with exotic uncommon birds. Chinese geese, parrots of various species, white and piebald peacocks are here at large or hang in expensive birdcages. These rarities coupled with the general beauty of this house attract here on Sundays and public holidays numerous crowds."

(Richter, Johann G., Moskwa. Eine Skizze. Leipzig: Hartknoch, 1799.)

=== Neoclassical facades ===
The Pashkov House has two main facades, one facing the carriageway and being palatial and solemn, the other facing the yard and looking cozier and more like a country estate.

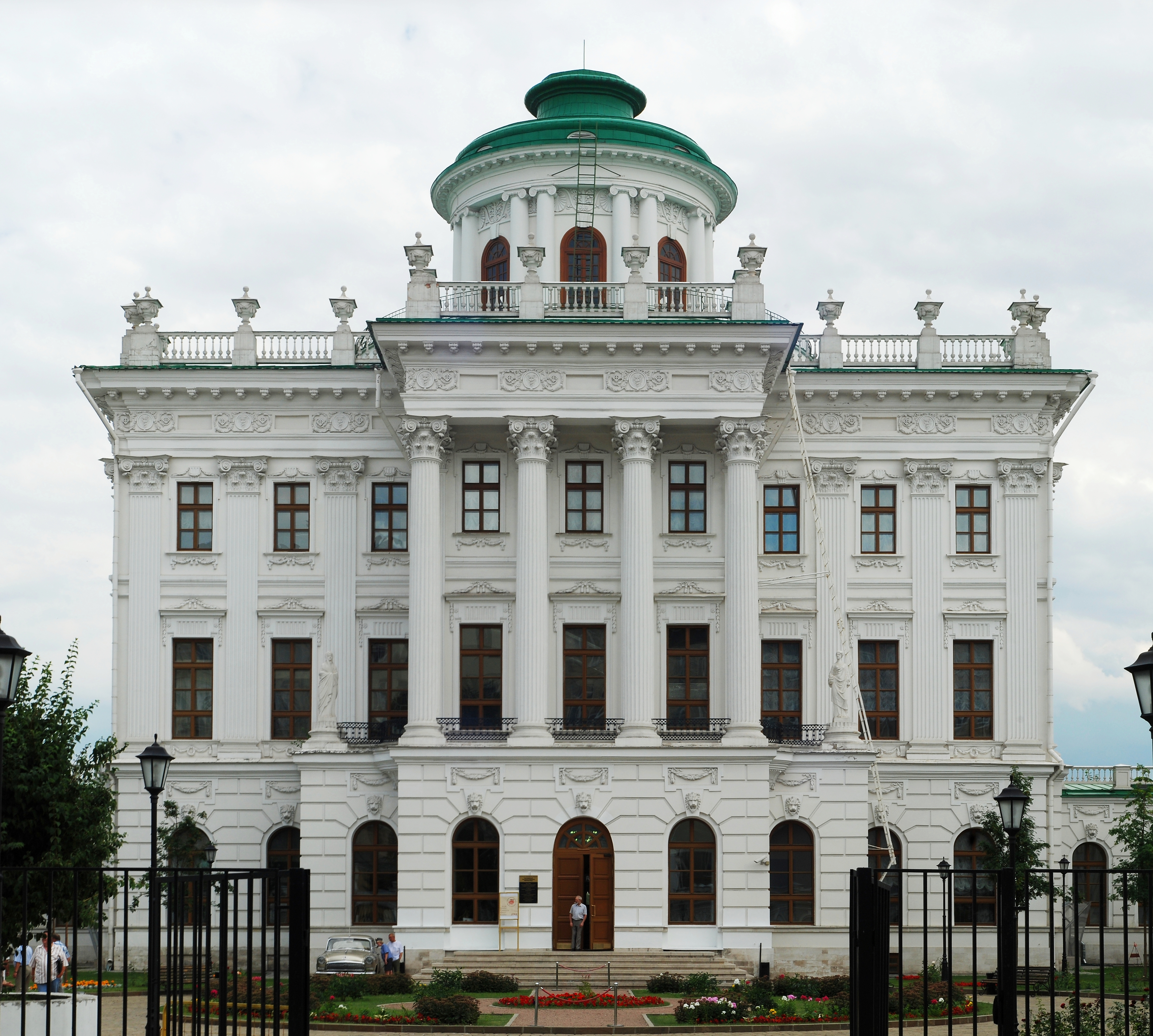
View of the Pashkov House's façade from the Starovagankovsky Lane

==== Order system ====
In contrast to rusticated ground floor, the porticoes use great order linking two floors.

=== Inner layout ===
Main and most grand premises of the palace were in its central building, entrance to which was along the axis of the building, from the side of the соurt of honor. Main vestibule was also located along the axis of the main building, where you can see the grand staircase. To the right of the vestibule, clear of the central axis, there was a grand staircase to the first floor leading to the ante-room and to the main hall. The service wings accommodated residential and service rooms.

== Building conversions ==
According to some sources, original color of the walls was orange. Paul I started changing the Bazhenov's appearance of the building: upon his orders, the statue of Minerva (or Mars, symbolizing the victories of the reign of his mother) crowning the dome, was removed from it.

=== Imperial period ===
During the Napoleon's invasion the building suffered heavy damage: the wooden belvedere with the Corinthian order roundabout colonnade crowning the building was destroyed, as well as a large statuary and coat of arms of the Pashkovs on the entablature of the central portico.

== Interesting facts ==
- The Pashkov House is described in Bulgakov's novel The Master and Margarita as the meeting place of Woland, Azazello and Levi Matvei.

== Other Pashkov houses ==
- Pashkov House (Second Pashkov House, Lecture Building (Russian: Аудиторный корпус), Pharmacy House (Russian: Аптекарский дом)) — these are the names under which the building of the Journalism Department of the Moscow University is mentioned in old documents. The building is also located on the Mokhovaya Street, 9. The reason was because the estate was also owned by a Pashkov, Alexander Illich Pashkov, a relative of Pyotr Pashkov. Another house owned by the Pashkovs was at Chistoprudny Boulevard, 12 .

== See also ==
- Rumyantsev Museum
