= Rumyantsev Museum =

Museum in Saint Petersburg, Russia

- Румянцевский музей
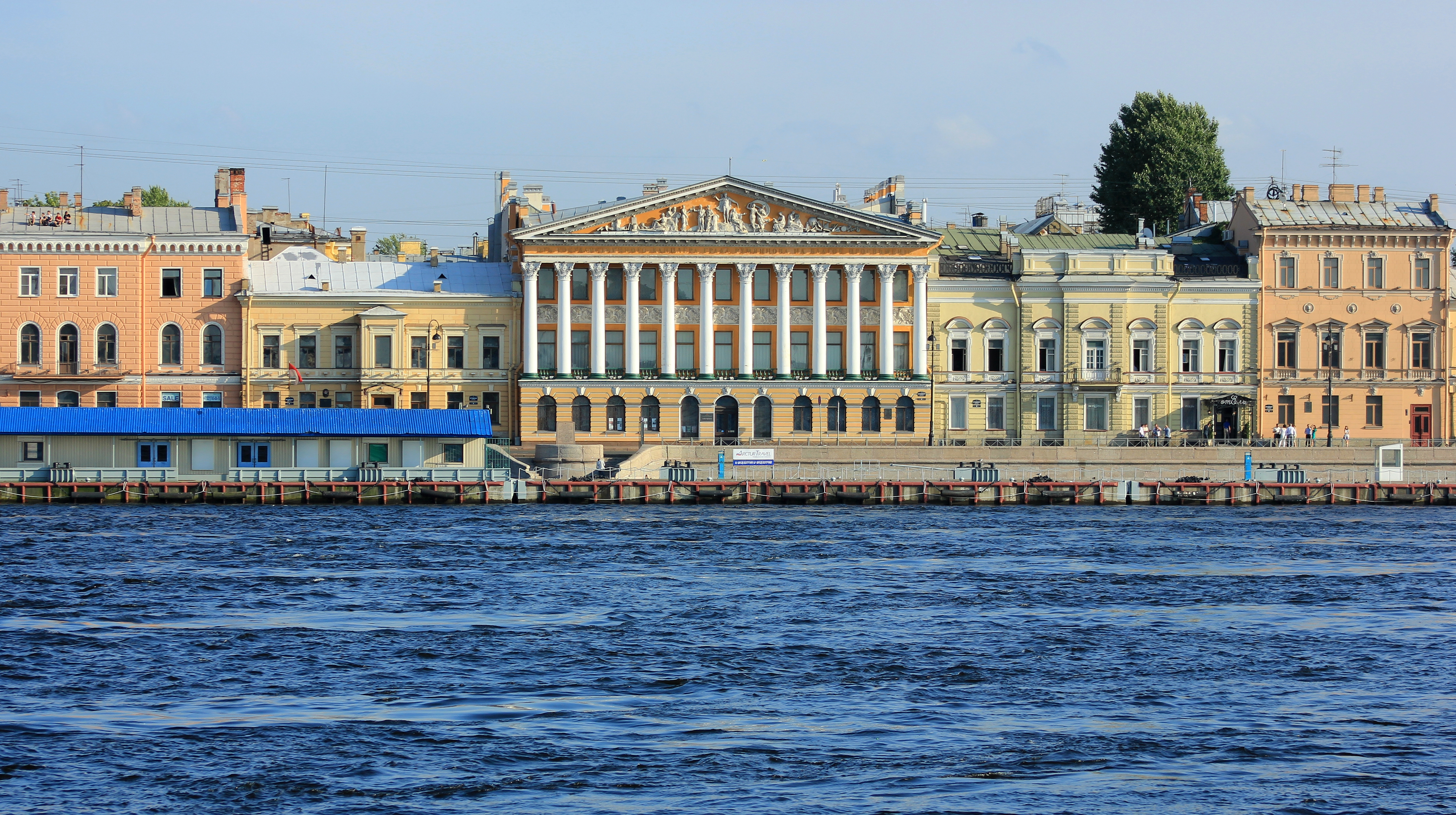
- Rumyantsev house (44) is centermost, located on the English Embankment in St. Petersburg. It now houses a branch of the State Museum of the History of Saint Petersburg.
- Established: 1828; 198 years ago Opened in 1831
- Dissolved: 1924
- Location: English Embankment 44, St. Petersburg (1828-1861) 59.93280°N 30.28939°E; Pashkov House, Moscow (1862–1924) 55.74967°N 37.60830°E

The Rumyantsev Museum (Note: Also spelt Rumiantsev) evolved from the personal library and historical collection of Count Nikolay Rumyantsev (1754–1826). Its origin was in St. Petersburg in the Rumyantsev house or mansion, building number 44 on the English Embankment overlooking river Neva. On Count Nikolay's last will, his brother, Count Sergei Rumyantsev, converted the house into a museum. It was opened to the general public in 1831, initially for one day a week, and the remaining days were for study.

Maintenance difficulties were among the reasons for the shift of Rumyantsev Museum to Moscow, despite it being affiliated to the Public Library in Saint Petersburg since 1845. In 1862, Nikolay's collection was combined with others, including paintings from the Hermitage Museum, and renamed the Moscow Public Museum and Rumyantsev Museum. By 1917 there would be four name changes and the collection grew to 1.5 million items. This increased to 2.7 million in the next three years following an expropriation and nationalisation campaign. A number of notable people used the library such as Dmitri Mendeleev, Konstantin Tsiolkovsky, Fyodor Dostoevsky, Leo Tolstoy and Vladimir Ulyanov (Vladimir Lenin).

In 1921 the museum and library were administratively and formally separated. A second deposit copy was permitted. In 1924, weeks after the death of Lenin, despite there being some contenders for Lenin's legacy such as the Public Library in Saint Petersburg, Rumyantsev Museum was reorganized as the Lenin Library. The Rumyantsev library became a part of the Lenin Library while other holdings were dissolved among the Tretyakov Gallery, Pushkin Museum of Fine Arts and the State Museum of Oriental Art among others. The Lenin Library would go on to become the Russian State Library in 1992.

== History ==
=== St. Petersburg (1828–1861) ===
Interactive map with outline of building 44

On the death of Count Nikolay Rumyantsev in 1826 his brother Count Sergei Rumyantsev inherited his property. Sergei knew that his brother Nikolay had wanted his personal art and book collection to be accessible to society. For this he decided to use the Rumyantsev house or mansion, located on the English Embankment in St. Petersburg, where Nikolay's collections were already stored. The Rumyantsev Museum was established in 1828. A decree was signed on 22 March 1828 regarding its establishment. The collection was gifted to the government. It was opened to the general public in 1831; initially one day a week for the general public and the remaining days for scholars.

The museum's collections, evolving from Count Nikolay Rumyantsev's own, included books and manuscripts, art, coins, medals, items from Russian voyages and circumnavigations, and from places such as the Museum of Antiquities in Vilnius. The collection of valuable books totaled to about 29,000 while other items numbered in the hundreds. The library included books from between the twelfth and nineteenth centuries. In his lifetime Rumyantsev had funded expeditions and excavations across the world. He also personally sent people across Russia to find books. Employees including a librarian and bibliographer helped Rumyantsev amass his collection. Assistant's included Friedrich von Adelung who was known for collecting foreign reports on Russia. Collaborators included Alexander Vostokov and Eugene Bolkhovitinov. Students of history such as Nikolay Karamzin used these historical resources.

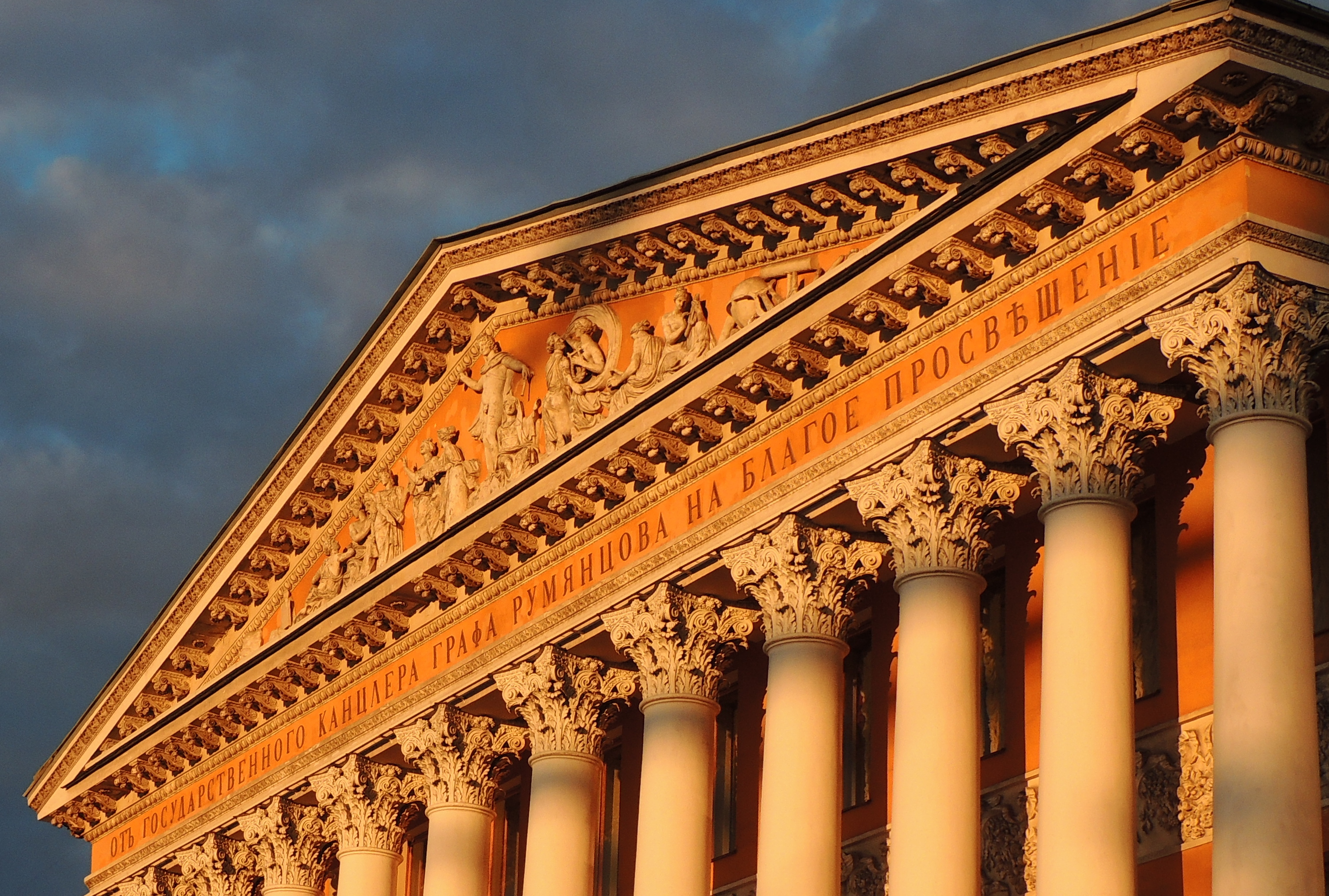
Pedimental sculpture by Ivan Martos inspired by mythology connected with Mount Parnassus, Apollo and Mnemosyne

An architect was involved in the conversion of the house(s) into a museum. It was at this stage in the mid-1830s when 12 columns were added to the front built up from the first floor. A pediment was added with sculpting by Ivan Martos. The sculpting on the pediment is inspired by mythology connected with Mount Parnassus, Apollo-Musagets, Mnemosyne and the Muses, a shout-out to the buildings' purpose as a museum as well as a reference to Rumyantsev. At a later date the pediment was engraved with the words of Nikolay, "for (the) good (of) enlightenment", (Note: "Good of enlightenment" as compared to "good enlightenment". See machine translations of the engraving by Deepl, Google and Yandex translate tools.) also translated as "for the benefit of education", with the entire engraving reading as, "From the State Chancellor Count Rumyantsev for the good enlightenment" (Russian: ОТb ГОСУДАРСТВЕННОГО КАНЦЛЕРА ГРАФА РУМЯНЦЕВА НА БЛАГОЕ ПРОСВЕЩЕ).

Since 1845 the Rumyantsev Museum was affiliated with the Imperial Public Library in St. Petersburg. Dmitry Buturlin, the director of the Imperial Public Library, was the museum director. Vladimir Odoevsky was actively associated with the library for about 15 years and during its shift to Moscow, continued as the library director. During the last few years of the museums' life in St. Petersburg the maintenance of the library proved difficult.

In 1863 the Rumyantsev house was sold to the editor of a newspaper. Further changes were made to the house by successive owners. 1930s onwards the house was used by the Museum of the History of Leningrad, now the State Museum of the History of Saint Petersburg.

=== Moscow (1862–1924) ===
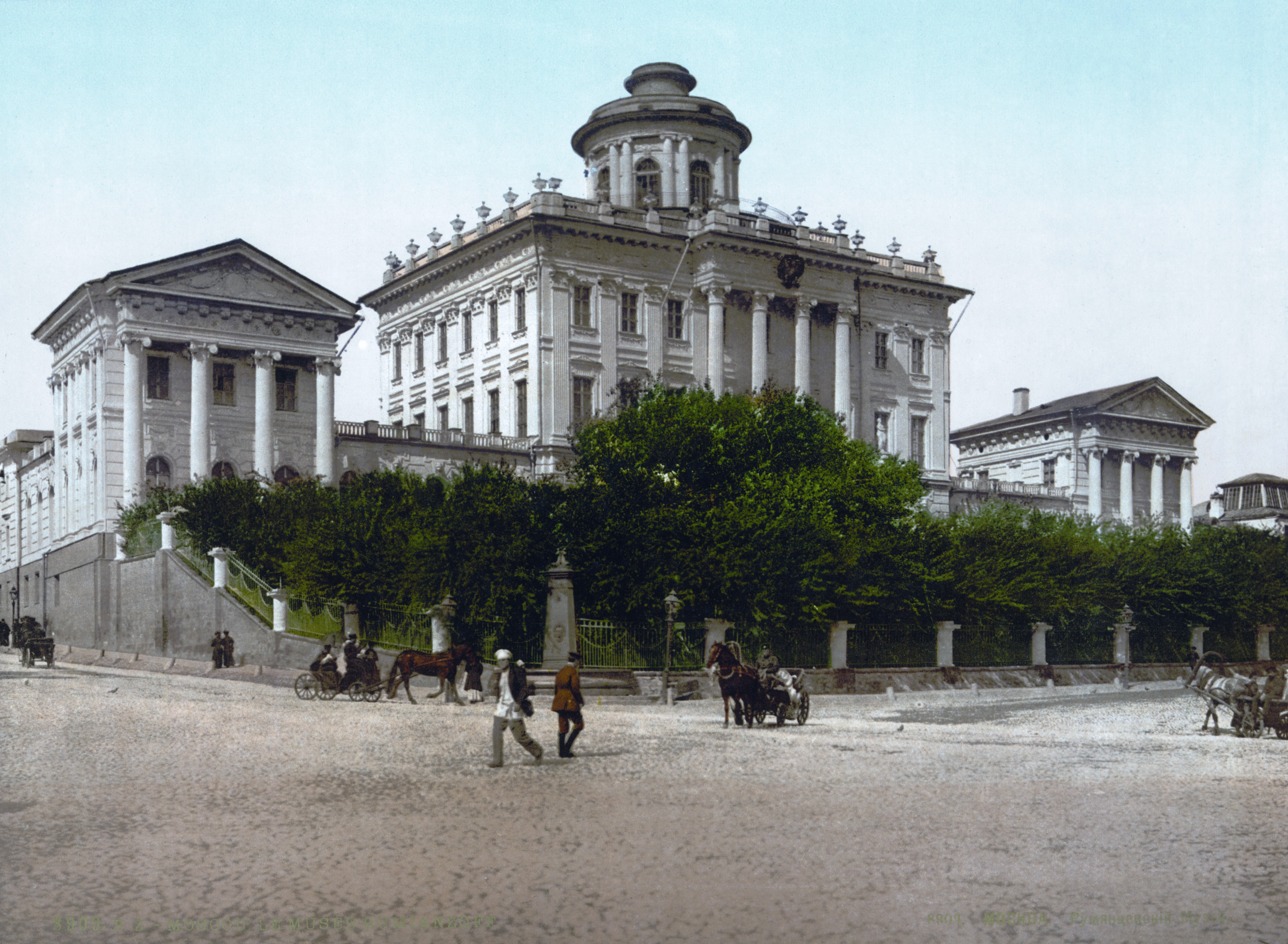
Pashkov House, 19th-century postcard

In May 1861 under the vision and advice of Nikolai Vasilyevich Isakov and his predecessor a decree for the "first public museum in Moscow" was framed and during the following year approved by Alexander II of Russia, then the emperor. The contents of the Rumyantsev Museum in St. Petersburg was shifted to Moscow and combined with other items including those from the Moscow University. Pictures were transferred from the Hermitage Museum. There had been certain discontentment among sections of society in St. Petersburg related to the shift of the library to Moscow.

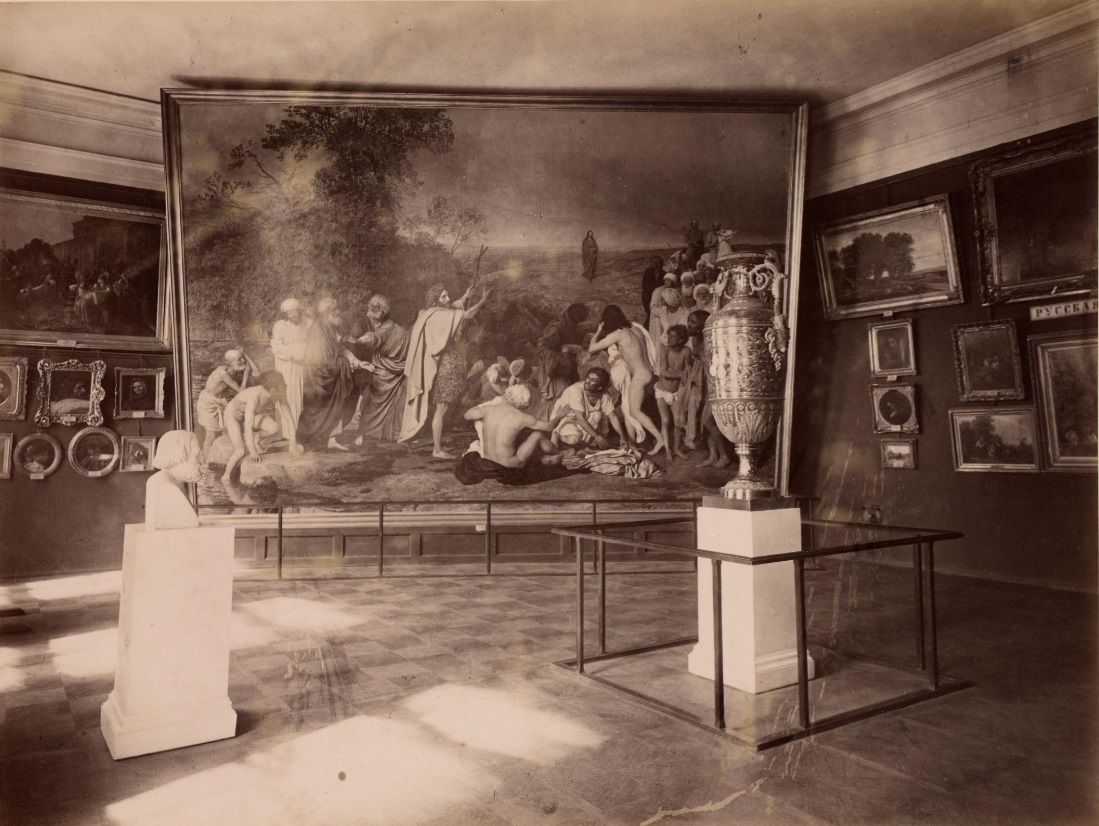
The Appearance of Christ Before the People at the Alexander Ivanov Hall of the Rumyantsev Museum, Moscow, 1881

The official founding date of the Moscow Public Museum and Rumyantsev Museum (MPRM) is 19 June 1862 when the regulations related to it were passed. While some collections such as the zoological collection were transferred to Moscow University, the Rumyantsev Museum, at the turn of the century, had a library and departments for antiquities, paintings, and ethnography among others. Katia Dianina of the department of Slavic Languages and Literatures of the University of Virginia writes that the shift of the museum to Moscow and its opening was the beginning of the city's "cultural renaissance".

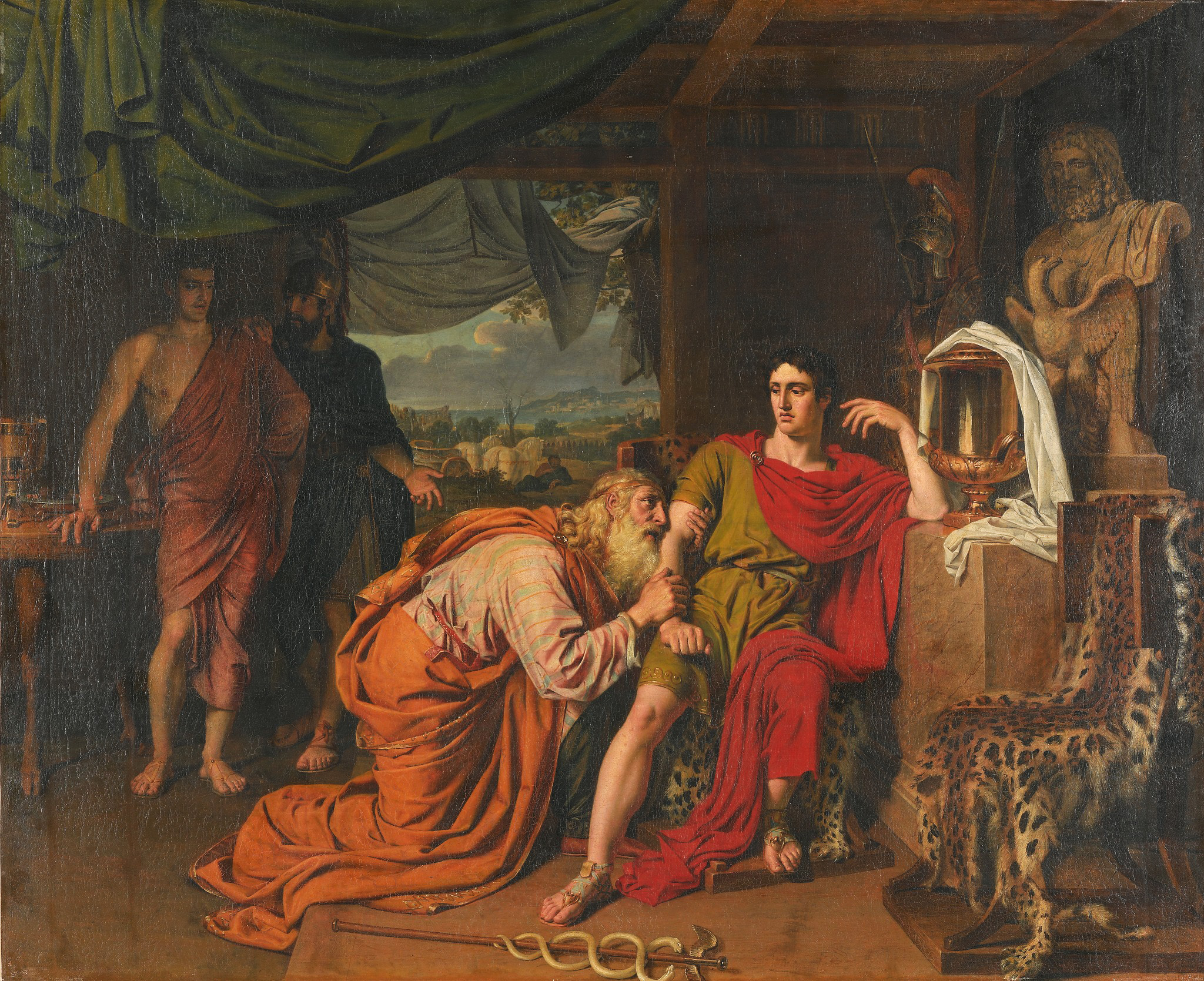
From the collections of Soldatyonkov, Ivanov's "Priam asks Achilles to return Hector's body" found its way into the museum collections in 1901.

The museum has undergone a number of changes in name,

Date	Name; additional information
St. Petersburg
1828–1861	Rumyantsev Museum
Moscow
1862–1869	Moscow Public Museum and Rumyantsev Museum
1869–1913	Moscow Public and Rumyantsev Museum
1913–1917	Imperial Moscow and Rumyantsev Museum
1917–1924	State Rumyantsev Museum; State Rumyantsev Library administratively separated in 1921
State Rumyantsev Museum merged and dissolved
1924–1925	V. I. Lenin Russian Public Library; also known as Lenin Library or Leninka
1925–1992	V. I. Lenin State Library of the USSR
1992–present	Russian State Library
Variations and other names include the Emperor Moscow and Rumyantsev Museum (1913–18); Rumyantsev State Museum and Library (1918–21); All-Russian Public Library (1924–25). See Grimsted (ed., 2000).

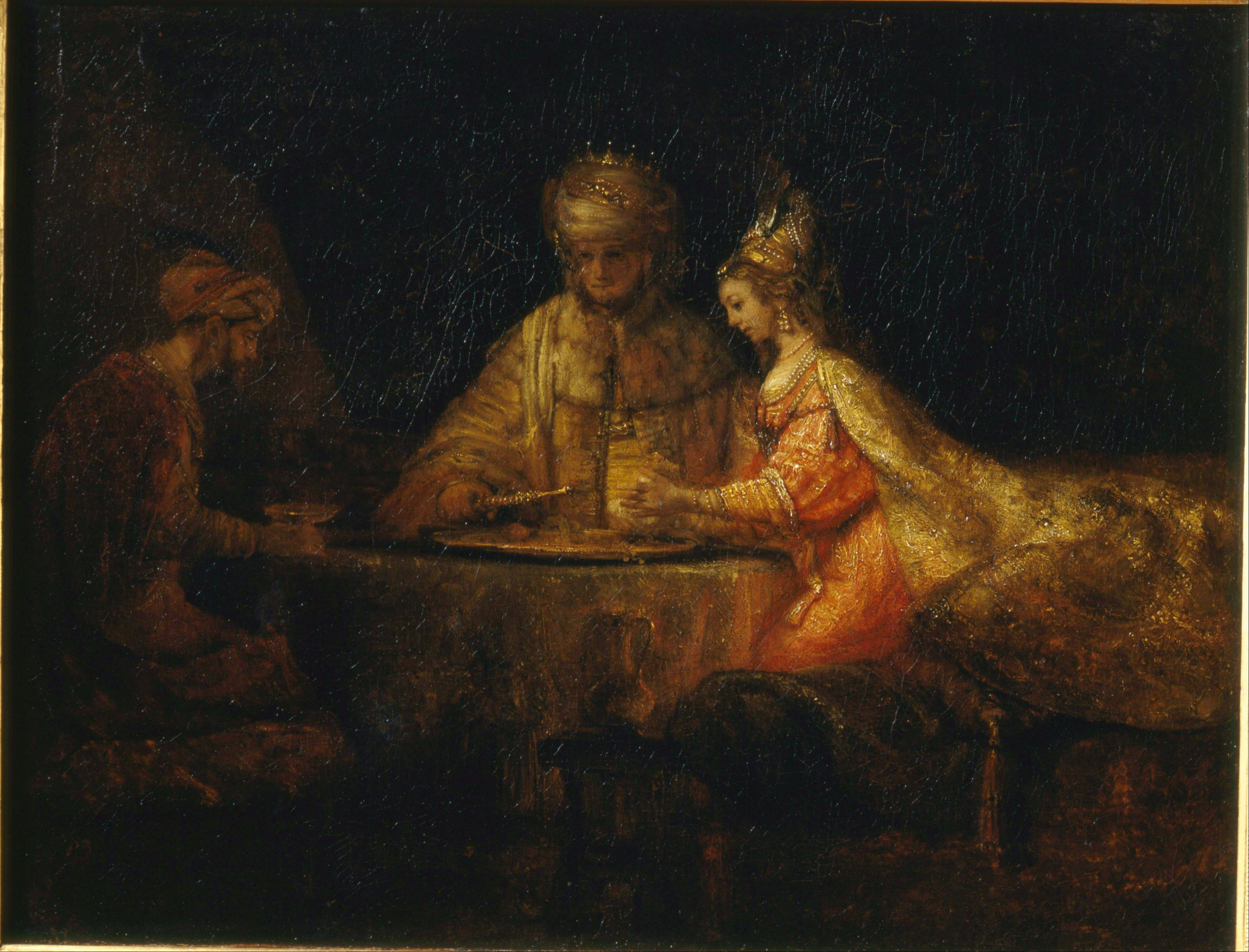
Rembrandt's painting Ahasuerus and Haman was one of the museum's highlights.

Its collection included paintings from the Old Masters and some more recent artists. Fyodor Pryanishnikov's collection was part of the museum. Leonid Pasternak's painting of Tolstoy was hung there. Pavel Tretyakov gave the museum Vladimir Borovikovsky's "Portrait of Amvrosy Podobedov". In 1862 the Ahasuerus and Haman at the Feast of Esther was given to the museum. The collection included the Archangel Gospel. Ivan Tsvetaev was a curator until he went on to found the Pushkin Museum in 1912.

In 1915 a new gallery opened with different floors holding Italian, French, Dutch and Russian works. There was also a section for Japanese and Chinese art. In 1900 the first dedicated space within the Pashkov House was created for the work of Alexander Andreyevich Ivanov and would remain the only named hall, the Ivanov Hall, of the museum library. In December 1921 the museum and library were administratively separated. The library was given the name "State Rumiantsev Library". A second deposit copy was permitted.

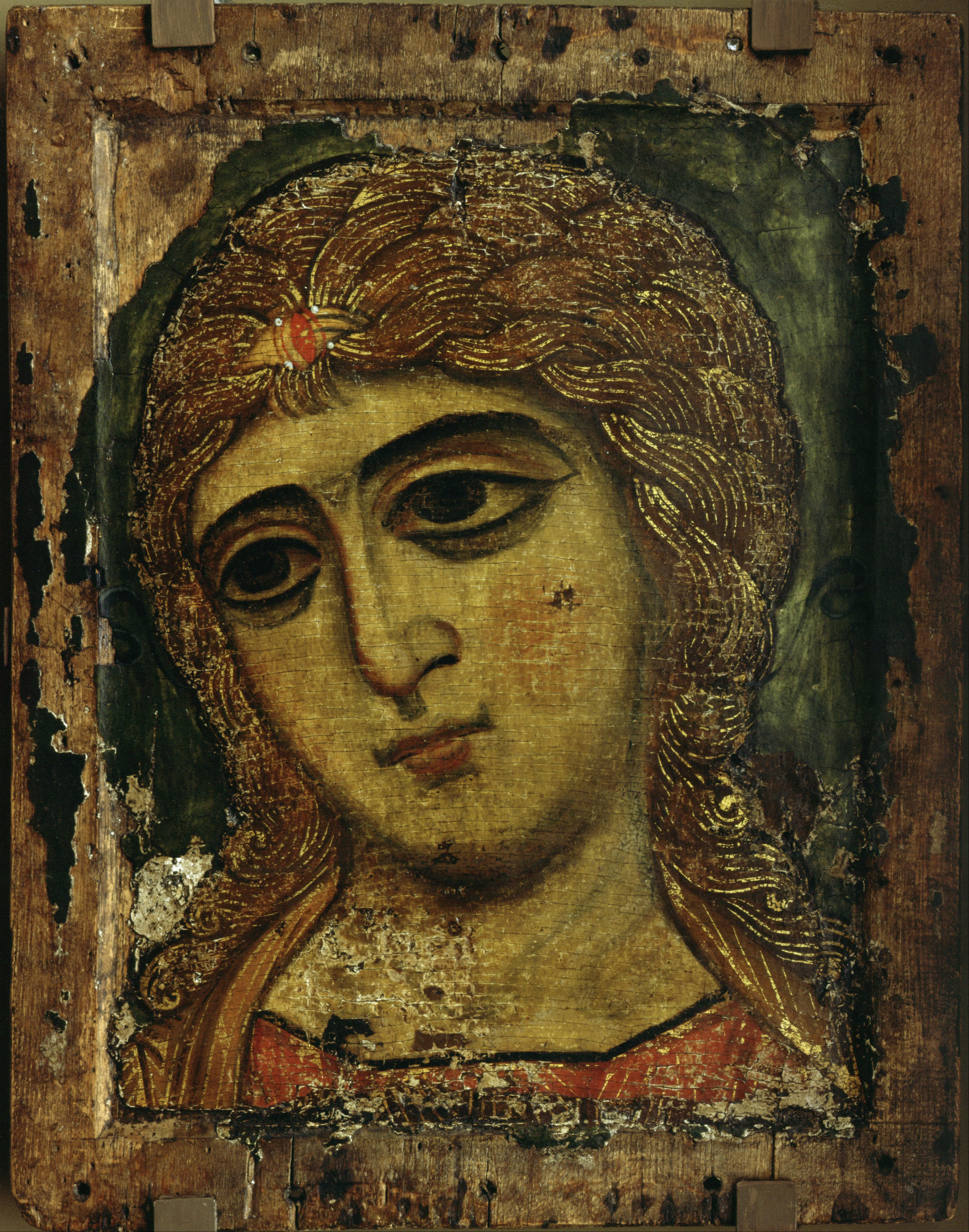
The Angel with Golden Hair, a 12th-century icon from Rumyantsev's collection. It is among the oldest Russian icons.

Dmitri Mendeleev, Fyodor Dostoevsky and Leo Tolstoy used the library. Sophia Tolstaya visited the library a number of times, including visits related to her husband Leo. Lenin also used and interacted with the library. Konstantin Tsiolkovsky, without the means to enroll in formal education during the period of 1873–1876 in Moscow, used the library's scientific literature during those three years. By 1917, the collection included 1.5 million items. This almost doubled to 2.7 million by 1920 following an expropriation and nationalisation campaign.

Lenin died on 21 January 1924. His name carried weight and to name an institution after him was an incentive for ensuring state funding in a difficult period. Despite the presence of contenders for Lenin's legacy, for example the Public Library in Saint Petersburg, on 5 February 1924 it was communicated that the Rumyantsev museum library would be renamed after Lenin and in the coming months it was made a national library. This change in name and designation also allowed for the highlighting of the working conditions in the library, including the health of the staff, one-fourth who had tuberculosis. The first director of the Lenin Library or Leninka (as the V. I. Lenin Russian Public Library was popularly known as) was Vladimir Nevsky.

The museum's collection of manuscripts and incunabula was reorganized as the Lenin Library; its holdings of Russian art went to the Tretyakov Gallery; the collection of old masters formed the nucleus of the Pushkin Museum of Fine Arts; this included The Appearance of Christ Before the People; collections went to the State Museum of Oriental Art; the Dashkov Museum (and Department of Foreign Ethnography) was incorporated into the Museum of the Peoples of the USSR.
