= Arkhangelsk Gospel =

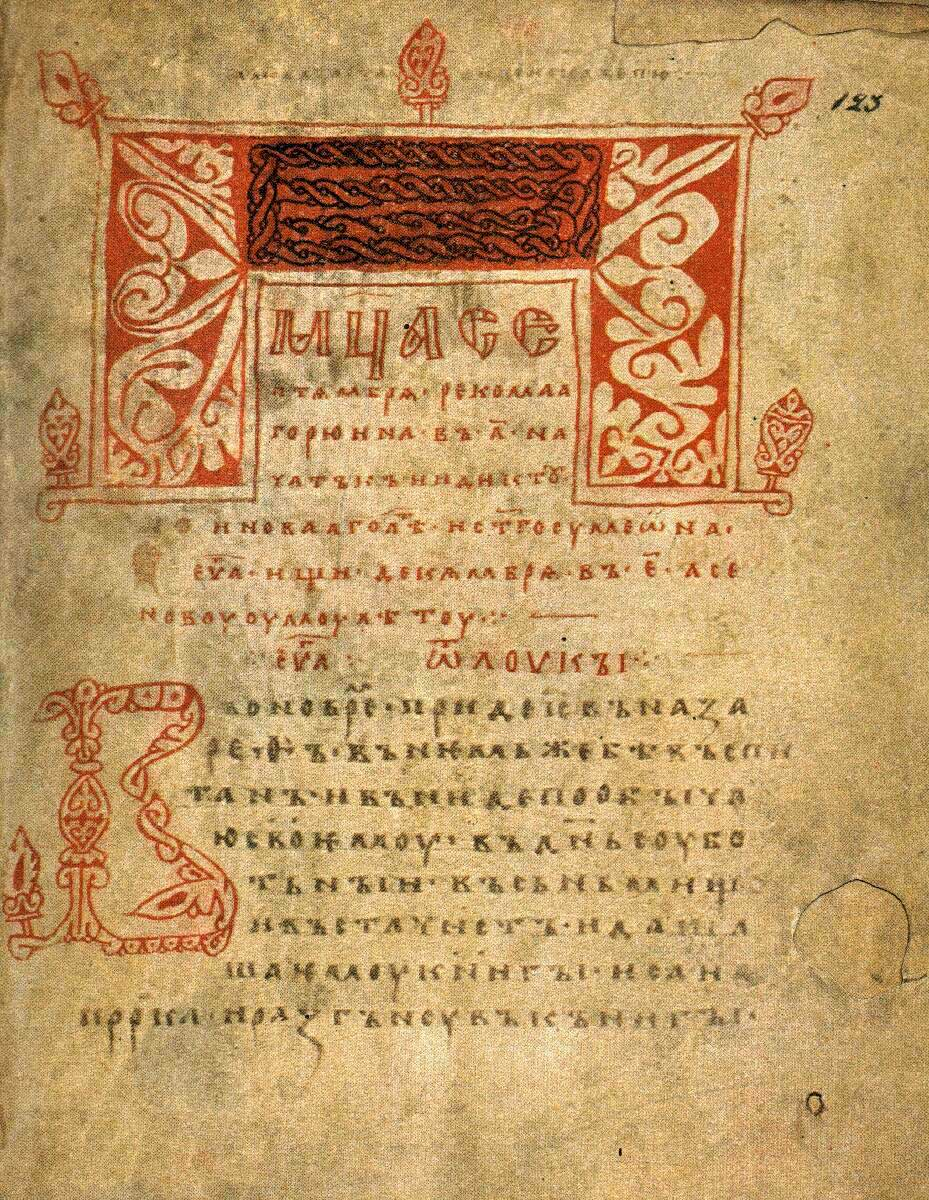
Page of Arkhangelsk Gospel

The Arkhangelsk Gospel (also called Archangel Gospel; Russian: Архангельское Евангелие) is a lectionary written in Old Church Slavonic dated to 1092. It is the fourth oldest Eastern Slavic manuscript. The book is stored in the collection of the Russian State Library. UNESCO added the Arkhangelsk Gospel to the international register Memory of the World Programme in 1997.

The Arkhangelsk Gospel has a modest design and is a cheap, mass-produced book. The story of its creation and provenance until 1876 is unknown. The book was brought to Moscow by a farmer from the Arkhangelsk region and is named after its place of discovery. The manuscript is in satisfactory condition - the ink and vermilion has crumbled in places, but the parchment does not have signs of contamination or moisture. The Arkhangelsk Gospel was reproduced in 1912 as a facsimile and in 1997 as a scientific publication.

== History of the manuscript ==
The early history of the manuscript and place of its provenance are unknown before 1876. There are some suggestions that it came from the scriptorium of the Lazarevsky monastery near Great Novgorod, but there is no unambiguous evidence to support the hypothesis.

In early December 1876 the manuscript was brought to Moscow by a peasant from Arkhangelsk region and was acquired by a Rumyantsev Museum trustee, merchant, old believer S. T. Bolshakov. He showed it to other bibliophiles and then offered to sell it to the Rumyantsev Museum for 400 rubles. Several experts worked with the manuscript in the museum, including E. B. Autograph, P. A. Kulish and A. L. Duvernoy. They concluded that it was written in 1192 because of the date of the scribe ending work on the manuscript ( Cyrillic numerals "from the creation of the world" - ҂ ЅѰ). At the request of Danilov Monastery dean paleographer Amphilochius (Sergius-Kazantsev), who worked at the time on Old Slavonic-Greek-Russian Dictionary using 11th and 12th-century manuscripts, Bolshakov took the Arkhangelsk Gospel from the museum and lent it to Amphilochius for study.

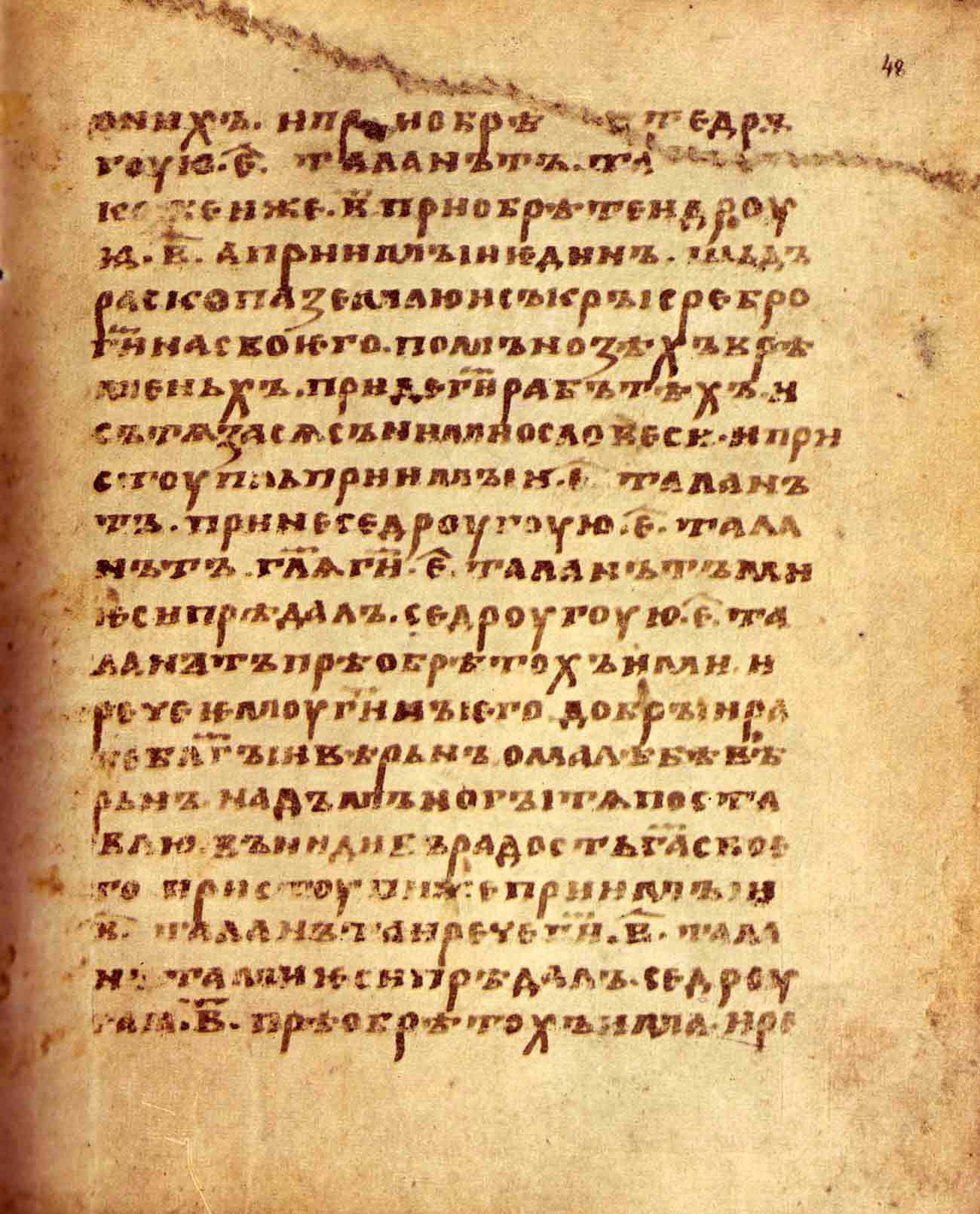
The image of a seam in the facsimile edition

In 1912, for the fiftieth anniversary of the Rumjancev Museum, the text of the codex was edited in 100 copies in a facsimile edition. The facsimile edition reproduces a natural colour of the manuscript (parchment, ink, pictures, and holes created by insects). The paper used for this edition has approximately the same thickness as the parchment of the original codex.

== Description ==
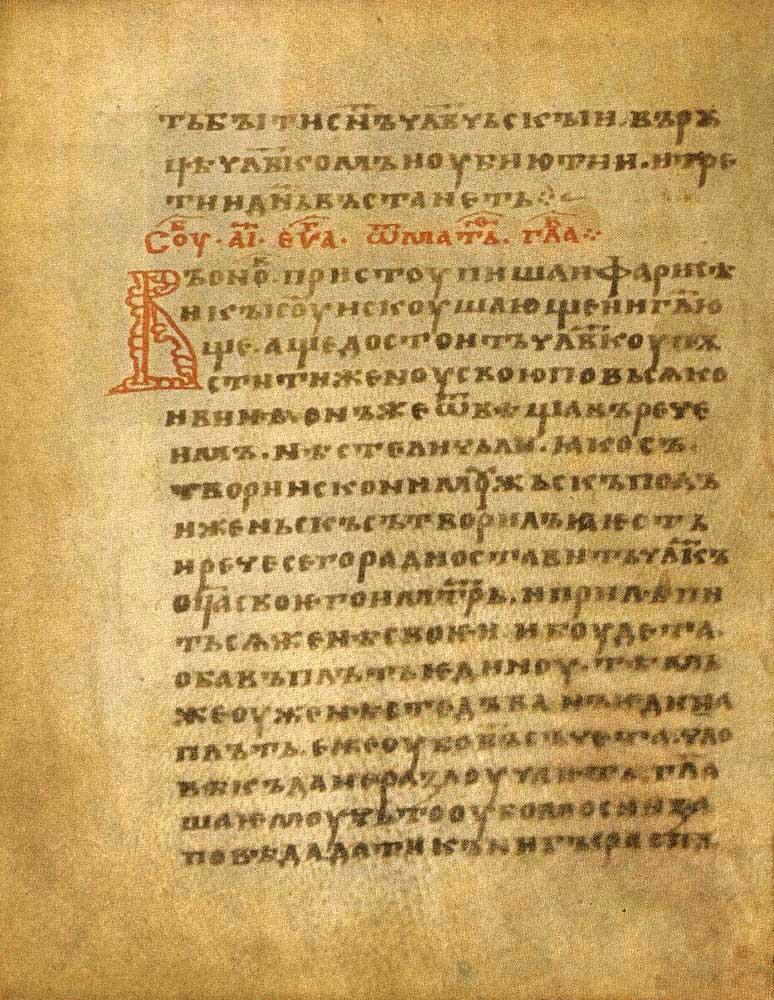
Folio 38 verso of the codex

The manuscript consists of 178 pages of different sizes ranging from 20×16 centimetres to 20.5×16.8 cm. The tops of the leaves have been cut off with damage of numbering of the quires. The manuscript is written on parchment made from calf skins. Experts describe the quality of the material as low: rough manufacture of the leather, very economical open. Fifty-four pages have various defects: rough fields which have been not sewn up or have unfilled holes, the filed parts of the leaves. The Arkhangelsk Gospel is in a satisfactory condition; the parchment is not polluted, and traces of moisture are absent, but a number of sheets show traces of wormholes. It appears that some sheets had ink and cinnabar droplets fall on them, but this does not interfere with the text's legibility. As the restoration of the manuscript from the moment of its discovery was never successful, the manuscript needs a new binding of the book block and strengthening of reliure.

The manuscript lost six of the 8-folios quires (three in the beginning, two between leaves 84 and 85, one between leaves 100 and 101) and five separate leaves — together 53 leaves are lost. Separately last leaf of the manuscript is sewn to the book block with the text-palimpsest (presumably 12th century), written on the old washed off text.

The main text of the manuscript was written by two scribes. It is believed, that the work of these scribes was distributed before work was started. As it « was done, possibly, for acceleration it is difficult to assume an opportunity of using the general original ». The first scribe copied the text of the Gospels lectionary (Evangelistarium) which goes back to Cyril and Methodius translation of the Gospels. The professor A. Voskresensky considers, that this text concerns to the most ancient Slavic translations of the four Gospels and represents the so-called Yugoslavian edition closest to initial translation of Cyril and Methody. This part of the Arkhangelsk Gospel contains a number of readings has the order distinct from readings of the Ostromir Gospel, and also there are inserts absent in the Gospel (for example, addition of lessons in a weekday from Easter to Pentecost). The second scribe copied the text of the full Gospel-lectionary which sample was not kept, but by its text from the Arkhangelsk Gospel, it has essential distinctions on structure and sequences of evangelical readings from the Mstislav Gospel (it is written till 1117), most ancient of kept full of lectionary markings.

Although ink and cinnabar used for initial letters partially fell off some pages the general state of manuscript is acceptable because its calf parchment pages are clean and dry. It has never been restored. The manuscript is kept in the holdings of Russian State Library in Moscow.

The first facsimile reprint of the Arkhangelsk Gospel was published in 1912, in 1997 there was a second annotated reprint.

The Arkhangelsk Gospel was included into the UNESCO’s Memory of the World Register – Europe and North America Memory of the World Register – in 1997 in recognition of its historical significance.

== Scribes of the codex ==
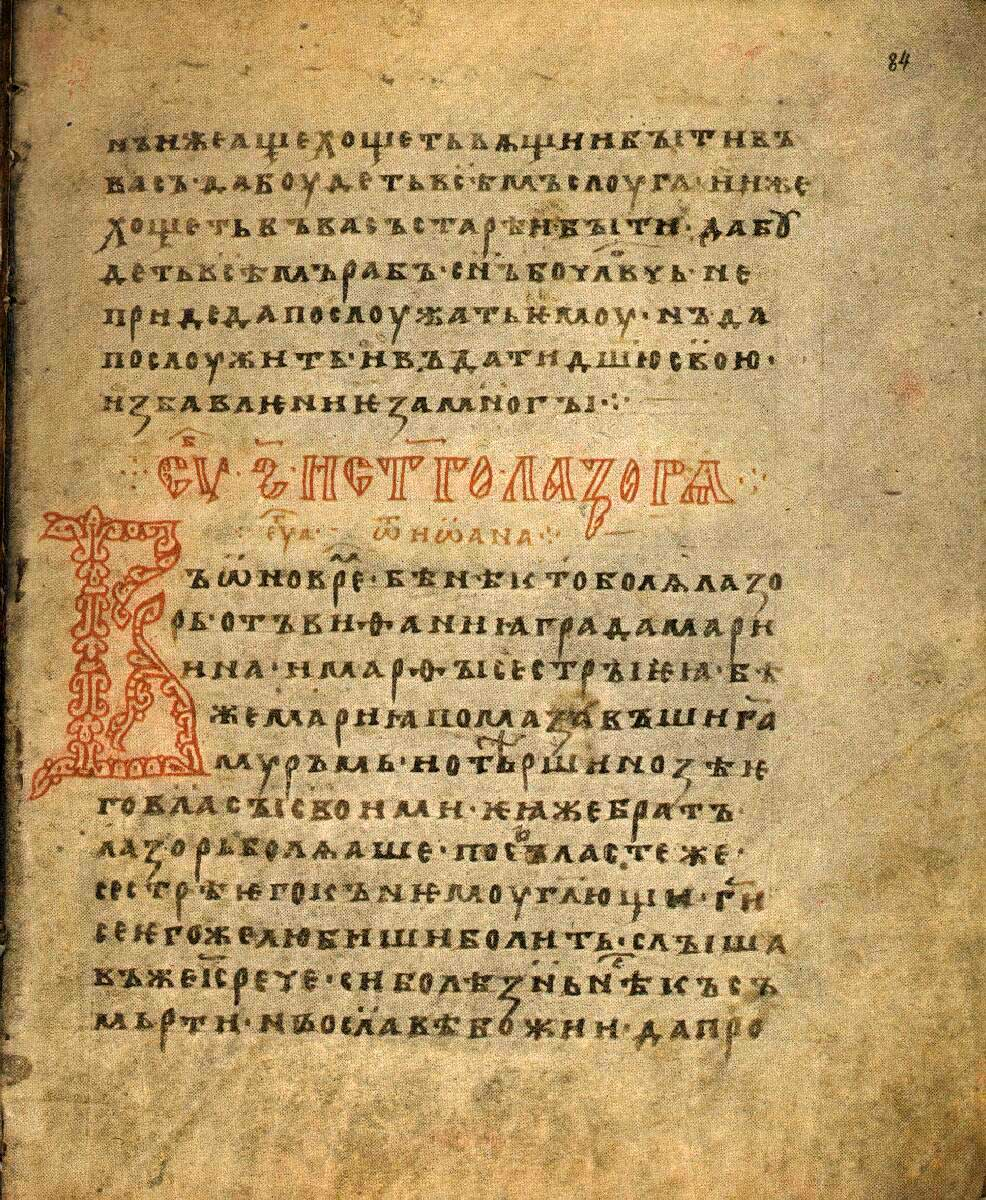
Folio 84 of the codex

The manuscript was written by two scribes (according to the colophon, their names were — Michka and presbyter Peter), and also the third scribe (Jakim or Akim), who is responsible for the 175—177 sheets (with Sunday Gospel lessons) and the fourth, which name is unknown — who wrote only leaf 178 (Gospel lessons at date of Archangel Michael). The handwriting of the two last scribes is dated palaeographically to the 13th–14th centuries. According to N. N. Durnovo the fourth scribe was a contemporary for the first two scribes and dates its work to the end of the 11th century, or to the beginning of the 12th century.

In the end written the fourth scribe writing existed a certain text which at the moment of detection of the manuscript to disassemble it was inconvenient. The chemical way of restoration of the text had completely destroyed this text. The manuscript is written by the documentary hands, the letters have essential deviations from the classical style according to which other monuments of that period were written (e.g. Ostromir Gospel).

== See also ==
- Slavic translations of the Bible
