= Rudolf Czipott =

Slovene Lutheran pastor and writer

Rudolf Czipott (Slovene: Rudolf Cipot) (January 14 or June 18, 1825 in Hodoš – May 20, 1901) was a Slovene Lutheran pastor and writer in Hungary.

== Early life ==
His father, György Czipott, was a writer, pastor, and teacher in the Slovenian town of Hodoš, and was born near Murska Sobota. His mother, Erzsébet Hutter, was of German descent, the daughter of the pastor of Kukmirn (Burgenland). Czipott had two brothers: Lajos and József.

Czipott's father died in 1834. The Czipott family moved to Sopron, where Czipott studied in the Lutheran Lyceum. By 1847, Czipott studied in Vienna, where he worked as a private teacher. In 1848, Czipott fought in the First Revolution of Vienna. After the revolution, he went home and worked as a government official in Kővágóörs, near Balaton. In 1853, Czipott and his mother moved to Vése (Somogy), and Czipott's mother died in 1884.

In 1858, the pastor of Puconci, Sándor Terplán, died, and Czipott received the parish of Puconci until he died in 1901.

== Works ==
- Predga 1888-ga leta oktobra 28-ga dnéva na dén reformátzie : vu Battyándszkoj (Püczonszkoj) ev. czérkvi. : V-Szoboti (Muraszombat) : stampano z-piszkmi Grünbaum Márka, 1888.
- Predga 1883-ga leta Octobra 14-toga dneva, liki na sztotni szpoumenek nasztávlanya Püczonszkoga Szpráviscsa czérkevnoga : i zkrátkim dojszpisüvanyem prigode püczonszke gmajne. V Keszthelyi vödána na sztroski pobozsnoga gmajnara Kühar Stevana Tesanovszkoga, 1884. 20. p.
- Vcsenyé konfirmátzie. V-Szoboti (Muraszombat): Czérkevno szpráviscse püczonszko, 1888. 44. p.

== See also ==
- List of Slovene writers and poets in Hungary
- György Czipott
