= Černelavci =

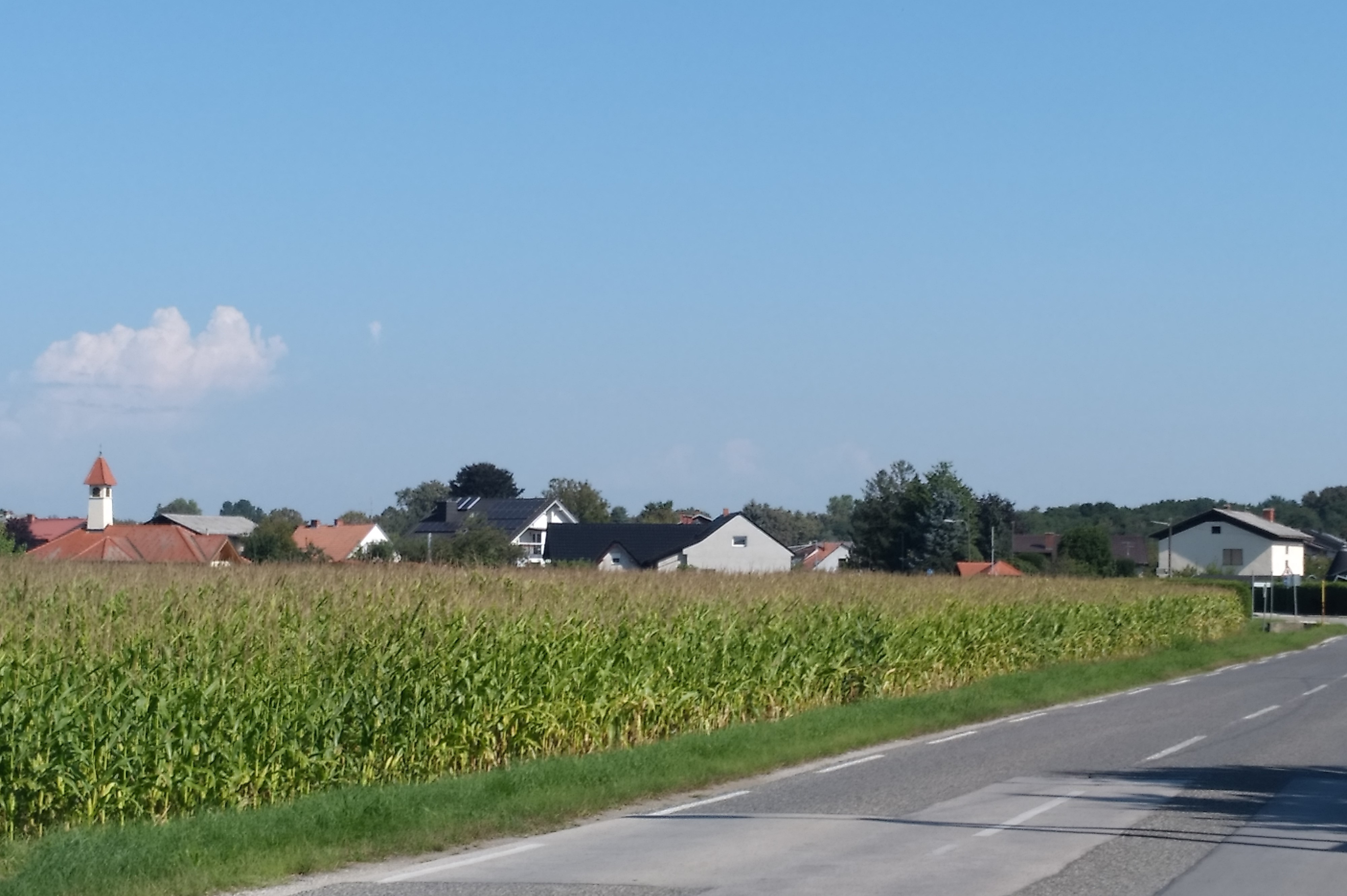

- Location in Slovenia
- Coordinates: 46°40′15″N 16°8′13″E
- Country: Slovenia
- Traditional region: Prekmurje
- Statistical region: Mura
- Municipality: Murska Sobota

Area
  - Total: 2.24 km^{2} (0.86 sq mi)
- Elevation: 192.5 m (632 ft)

Population (2002)
  - Total: 1,741

Černelavci (pronounced [tʃɛɾˈneːlau̯tsi]; Hungarian: Kisszombat) is a village in the Municipality of Murska Sobota in the Prekmurje region of northeastern Slovenia.

The writer György Czipott was born here.
