= Ivanovci, Moravske Toplice =

Ivanovci Ivónovci, Alsószentbenedek
- Location in Slovenia
- Coordinates: 46°44′16″N 16°13′47″E
- Country: Slovenia
- Traditional region: Prekmurje
- Statistical region: Mura
- Municipality: Moravske Toplice

Area
  - Total: 3.78 km^{2} (1.46 sq mi)
- Elevation: 274.1 m (899 ft)

Population (2002)
  - Total: 131

Ivanovci (pronounced [iˈʋaːnɔu̯tsi]; Prekmurje Slovene: Ivónovci, Hungarian: Alsószentbenedek) is a dispersed village in the Municipality of Moravske Toplice in the Prekmurje region of Slovenia.

The writer and politician József Borovnyák, the writer and politician Ferenc Ivanóczy, the writer Sándor Terplán, and the poet Ágost Péter Lutharics were all born in Ivanovci. The writer István Szelmár also lived in the village.

== Bibliography ==
- Rešek, Dušan (1995). Brezglavjeki. Zgodbe iz Prekmurja. Ljubljana: ČZD Kmečki glas. ISBN 961-203-060-X.
