= György Czipott =

Slovenian Lutheran pastor, teacher and writer

György Czipott Slovene Juri Cipot, Prekmurje Slovene Djürji Cipott (April 6, 1793 or April 1, 1794 – November 9, 1834) was a Slovenian Lutheran pastor, teacher, and writer in Hungary. His son Rudolf Czipott was a writer.

He was born in Černelavci, near Murska Sobota, or according to other sources in Puconci. He and his parents Miklós Czipott and Flóra Pekits soon moved to Polana.

Czipott studied at the Lutheran Lyceum of Sopron, and he was a curate in Körmend, and later in Legrad (Croatia). By 1821 he was serving in Hodoš, where he built a new church in 1823.

In 1829 he wrote his work Dühovni áldovi (Spiritual Blessings).

Czipott died in 1834. His successor in Puconci was the writer and poet János Kardos.

== Works ==
- Dühovni áldovi ali molitvene knige Krszcsenikom na szrdcza i düse opravo i obeszeljávanye vu tuzni 'zitka vöraj. Szpravlene po Czípott Gyürji Evangelicsánszke Hodoske Fare Dühovniki. V. Sombathéli z Perger Ferentza píszkmi 1829.

== See also ==
- List of Slovene writers and poets in Hungary
- Rudolf Czipott
