= István Szelmár =

Slovene Roman Catholic priest and writer

István Szelmár, also known in Slovene as Števan Selmar (23 October 1820 – 15 February 1877) was a Slovene Roman Catholic priest and writer in the Kingdom of Hungary.

His original surname was Szlámár (Slamar). His father's name was Mihály Szlámár. However, in the historical Wendic March (the modern Prekmurje and Vendvidék) the Slovene names of the population were frequently altered, insofar as they were registered by the Hungarian authorities, which often misspelled them.

Szelmár was born in Grad (Felsőlendva), and was ordained on 20 July 1845, in Szombathely. From 1845 to 1846 he served as chaplain in Črenšovci, and between 1856 and 1860 in Turnišče. In 1860 he became priest in Kančevci, and in the end of 1876 he was retired. He died in Ivanovci.

He wrote books in the Prekmurje Slovene of Slovene, and was thus an influential representative of the local Slovene literature in the Kingdom of Hungary. In 1873 he translated the Hungarian book by Alajos Róder Bibliai Történetek (History of the Bible). The Slovenian translation is called Zgodbe Sztaroga i Nóvoga Zákona (Stories of the Old and New Testament).

== Works ==
- Zgodbe Sztaroga i Nóvoga Zákona, za s'olszko detczo poleg knige Roder Alajosa na sztari szlovenszki jezik prenesene. Vödane po drüstvi szvetoga Stevana. Z- dopüsztsényem V. p. g. Szombotelszkoga püspeka. V- Jagri (Erlau). Stamp Archi Lyceo 1873.

== See also ==
- List of Slovene writers and poets in Hungary
- Bible translations into Prekmurje Slovene
