= József Borovnyák =

Prekmurje Slovene writer, politician and Roman Catholic priest

József Borovnják
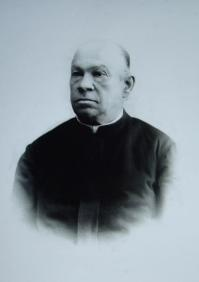
- Born: Around February 9, 1826; Ivanovci (Ivanócz/Alsószentbenedek), Kingdom of Hungary (now Slovenia)
- Died: September 19, 1909; Cankova, Austro-Hungarian Empire (now Slovenia)
- Occupations: Writer, politician, priest
- Writing career
- Genres: religious works, political works
- Literary movement: Nationalism, Catholicism

József Borovnyák or Borovnják (Slovene: Jožef Borovnjak; 1826 – 19 September 1909) was a Prekmurje Slovene writer, politician, and Roman Catholic priest in Hungary.

Borovnják was born in the village of Ivanócz (later Alsószentbenedek, Slovenian Ivanovci). His family was originally Protestant. His father converted to Catholicism.

Borovnják first served as a priest from 1851 to 1852 at the Istvánfalvian Church in the village of Apátistvánfalva (Vas Country). He was later a priest in Felsőlendva and Cankova (where he died).

Borovnják was a defender of the local Prekmurje Slovene language. He wrote books in it; for example, a catechism and prayer books. In 1877 he posthumously reprinted Miklós Küzmics' Prekmurje Slovene translation of the gospels. He was also involved in politics.

== Works ==
- Jezus moje poslenje (Jesus Is My Desire),
- Veliki katekizmus (Large Catechism)
- Kniga molitvena sztara szlovenszka (Old Slovene Prayer Book)
- Dühovna hrána (The House of the Soul)
- Máli politicsni vodnik (Little Political Mirror)
- Szvéti Angel Csuvár (Holy Guardian Angel)

== See also ==
- List of Slovene writers and poets in Hungary
