= Strukovci =

Strukovci Sűrűház
- Location in Slovenia
- Coordinates: 46°42′30.03″N 16°3′44.65″E
- Country: Slovenia
- Traditional region: Prekmurje
- Statistical region: Mura
- Municipality: Puconci

Area
  - Total: 4.37 km^{2} (1.69 sq mi)
- Elevation: 206.5 m (677 ft)

Population (2002)
  - Total: 183

Strukovci (pronounced [ˈstɾuːkɔu̯tsi]; Hungarian: Sűrűház, Prekmurje Slovene: Strükovci) is a settlement in the Municipality of Puconci in the Prekmurje region of Slovenia. It is divided into the hamlets of Zgornji Strukovci ('Upper Strukovci') and Spodnji Strukovci ('Lower Strukovci').

== Notable people ==
Notable people that were born or lived in Strukovci include:

- István Küzmics (ca. 1723–1779), Lutheran writer. The house he was born in is protected as a monument and there is a commemorative plaque on the building.
