= Nikola Krajačević =

Nikola Krajačević Sartorius
- Born: November 29, 1582; Sisak
- Died: March 9, 1653 (aged 70); Zagreb
- Other names: Nikola Krajačić, Nikolaus Krajačević, Mikula Kraječević
- Occupation: Jesuit Catholic priest
- Known for: publishing the first shtokavian Latin script religious poems

Nikola Krajačević Sartorius or Mikula Krajačević (November 29, 1582 – March 9, 1653) was a Croatian Jesuit Catholic priest, missionary and prominent person of Counter-Reformation movement in Habsburg Slavonia. Krajačević was born in a family whose members were military officers at Habsburg Military Frontier against the Ottomans. In his early life he was military officer. Krajačević completed his education in Graz, Brno, Rome and Eberndorf and had successful career in Catholic church in the Roman Catholic Archdiocese of Zagreb reaching positions of teacher, canon and archdeacon. He published at least two books in which he translated religious texts to "Slovenski" language of Kajkavian dialect. To promote religious poems and make them more acceptable to population he replaced or adopted texts of folk poems with texts of religious poems.

== Education and religious positions ==
Krajačević's father Vuk was Habsburg military officer at Military Frontier. Krajačević was also military officer at the beginning of his adult life and even participated in battles against the Ottomans. According to some views, after Krajačević left military service he studied philosophy in Graz and theology probably in Rome. In 1612 Krajačević returned to Zagreb and began his career as Catholic priest. By 1614 Krajačević reached positions of the canon in Zagreb and archdeacon in Čazma.

In 1615 he joined Jesuits and studied in Brno for a year and for two years in Eberndorf. Krajačević is also referred to as Sartorius, which was his Latinized name.

Krajačević was a teacher at the Jesuit college in Zagreb. Among his students was Juraj Križanić.

== Bibliography ==
Krajačević referred to the Kajkavian as Slovenski language to differentiate it from Čakavian and Štokavian to which he referred as Horvatski.

Miroslav Vanino was one of main researchers of Krajačević's life and works. He believes that Krajačević published at least one of his works before 1629. Since 1640 Krajačević authored two books: the Prayer Book and Saint Evangelions.

Krajačević published Prayer Book ("Molitvene knjižice Kristušovem vernei slovenskoga jezika, pristojne i hasnovite") in 1640 in Požun on Kajkavian. Although this work was anonymous publication at the beginning of the 20th century it was proven to be authored by Krajačević. In his works Krajačević wanted to make spiritual texts more acceptable to the common public and published them together with adapted folk poetry, which he considered filthy and inappropriate. Sometimes he would adopt or replace text of folk poems with religious texts expecting that religious texts will gradually be accepted and sung by population.

Krajačić's Saint Evangelions were published by Petar Petretić who wrote its prologue in Graz in 1651. In this book Krajačić introduced orthographic reform which was later both praised and criticized. It was praised by Pavao Ritter Vitezović, who mistakenly attributed it to Petretić who only published the book. On the other hand, Ljudevit Gaj heavily criticized it, also mistakenly attributing it to Petretić. According to some authors, Saint Evangelions were authored by multiple different authors whose texts Krajačević compiled and edited.

Krajačević's works were also widespread in the Slovene regions, primarily in Prekmurje, and had an influence on Prekmurje Slovene. Krajačević's life work largely inspired the works of Miklós Küzmics.

== Sources ==
- Capar, Nikola; Jembrih, Alojz; Poljanec, Vladimir (2006). Kajkavski u povijesnom i sadašnjem obzorju: zbornik radova s Okruglih stolova (znanstvenih kolokvija i skupova) u Krapini 2002. - 2006. Hrvatska udruga Muži zagorskog srca. ISBN 978-953-97412-4-0.
- Laginja (1953). Povijest književnosti naroda Jugoslavije. Nakl. Istarske Knjižare Matko Laginja.
- Družba (1992). Isusovci u Hrvata: zbornik radova međunarodnog znanstvenog simpozija "Isusovci na vjerskom, znanstvenom i kulturnom području u Hrvata". Filozofsko-teološki institut Družbe Isusove.
- Srejović, Dragoslav; Gavrilović, Slavko; Ćirković, Sima M. (1986). Istorija srpskog naroda: knj. Srbi u XVIII veku (2 v.). Srpska književna zadruga.
- Klaić, Vjekoslav (1928). Crtice iz Hrvatske prošlosti. Matica Hrvatske.
- Franičević, Marin; Šelec, Franjo; Bogišić, Rafo (1974). Od renesanse do prosvjetiteljstva. Liber : Mladost.
- Hoško, Franjo Emanuel (1985). Negdašnji hrvatski katekizmi. Salezijanski provincijalat.
- Andreis, Josip (1962). Historijski razvoj muzičke kulture u Jugoslaviji. Školska knj.
- Matica (1987). Dometi. Matica hrvatska Rijeka.
- István, Lőkös (2014). LITTERATURA KAJKAVIANA (in Hungarian). Budapest: Kairosz Kiadó.
- Fine, John V. A. (5 February 2010). When Ethnicity Did Not Matter in the Balkans: A Study of Identity in Pre-Nationalist Croatia, Dalmatia, and Slavonia in the Medieval and Early-Modern Periods. University of Michigan Press. ISBN 978-0-472-02560-2.
- Kaj. 1996.
