= Sándor Terplán =

Hungarian Lutheran priest and writer

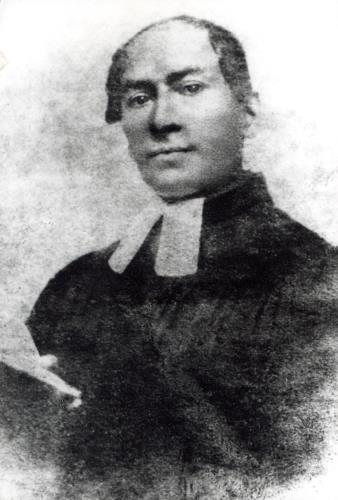
The daguerreotype of Sándor Terplán.

Sándor Terplán (Slovene: Aleksander Terplan or Trpljan) (c. May 1, 1816 – March 18, 1858) was a Hungarian Lutheran priest and writer.

Terplán was born in the Ivanovci in the Prekmurje region in the Kingdom of Hungary, into a Hungarian Slovene Lutheran family. Several priests were born in his village, both Catholic and Lutheran, including littérateurs or gentilitial politicians, such as József Borovnják and Ferenc Ivanóczy.

Terplán's father Iván Terplan was a tailor and wine-merchant and estate manager of Baron Szaller in Ivanovci. His mother Zsuzsanna Berke was the aunt of writer Iván Berke and she was from noble family. Sándor Terplan studied in the elementary schools of Domanjševci and Szentgyörgyvölgy, in the Őrség region. From 1828 he studied in Kőszeg and also in Sopron, where he studied theology. In 1837 he got a scholarship and went to Vienna.

He started working as a chaplain in Puconci, near Murska Sobota. Later he lived in Szombathely, but in 1843 moved back to Puconci where he became the village's pastor in 1844. He died of illness at the age of 42.

Terplán did a lot for preservation of the identity of the local Slovenes. He was in contact with the murian littérateurs, such as János Kardos and Rudolf Czipott (he also celebrated the funeral mass of the latter). His first works were two prayer books for burials and vigils (1838). A work of his about the hearing of the confessions of the sick, written in Hungarian and German, remains in manuscript. He also wrote a pupils' textbook and a psalms book. Several of his works were only published after his death.

== Works ==
- Dvakrat 52 Bibliszke historia, 1847 Kőszeg
- Knige 'zoltárszke, 1848 Kőszeg
- Peszmi i réd, 1856 Graz
- Krszcsánsztva Ábéczé, 1869 Sopron

Scripts

- Agenda (Latin), December 1838
- Molitvi na rázlocsne potrebcsine, October 7, 1838.
- Molitvi pri Szprevájanyi i pokápanyi Mrtveczov, 1838
- Szpoved Betecznikov, 1849
- Betegek gyóntatása (Hungarian), 1849
- Kranken-Communion (German), October 7, 1849.
- Temetéskorra való imádságok (Hungarian), 1849

== See also ==
- List of Slovene writers and poets in Hungary
