= New Testament in Silesian =

2017 translation of the Christian scripture into a Slavic language

Nowy Testamynt po ślonsku
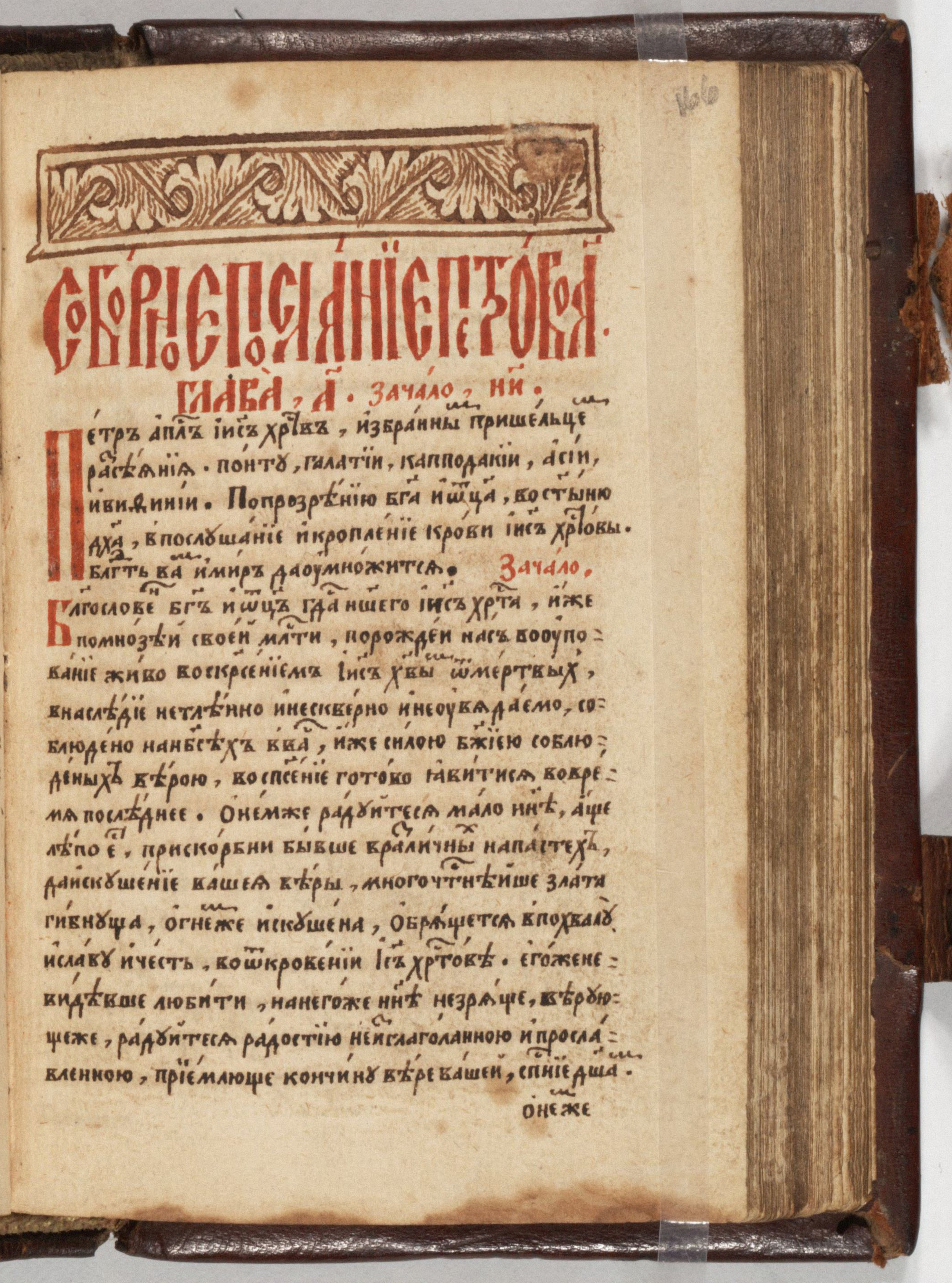
- Translator: Gabriel Tobor
- Language: Silesian
- Genre: Religious text
- Publisher: Szymon Tobor, Wydawnictwo Tobor, Radzionków, Poland
- Publication date: 2017
- Publication place: Poland
- Pages: 608
- ISBN: 978-83-948722-0-5

Nowy Testamynt po ślonsku [The New Testament in Silesian] was published in 2017 in Radzionków, Upper Silesia, Poland by Szymon Tobor's publishing house, Wydawnictwo Tobor. Gabriel Tobor translated the New Testament into the Silesian language from the 16th-century Polish language Jakub Wujek Bible. For the sake of this translation the translator developed a specific spelling fully based on Polish orthography, rather than follow the standard Silesian spelling system.

This Silesian-language translation of the New Testament was received to much acclaim among the Silesian-speaking community. On 13 December 2017 a conference on this translation was held in Upper Silesia's largest dedicated regional library, namely Biblioteka Śląska,

The translation is prefaced by Father Damian Wojtyczka, Dean of the Roman Catholic Deanery of Piekary Śląskie. Upper Silesia's Catholic clergy and hierarchs mostly approve of this translation. In early 2018 this Silesian-language translation was presented by the translator to Pope Francis, who accepted this gift and praised the ‘perfectly executed translation,’ as stated in the letter dated 6 February 2018, signed by Monsignor Paolo Borgia, Assessor for General Affairs, Secretariat of State (Holy See).

== See also ==
- List of Bible translations by language
