= János Szily =

Hungarian bishop and patron of the arts

- Bishop of Szombathely
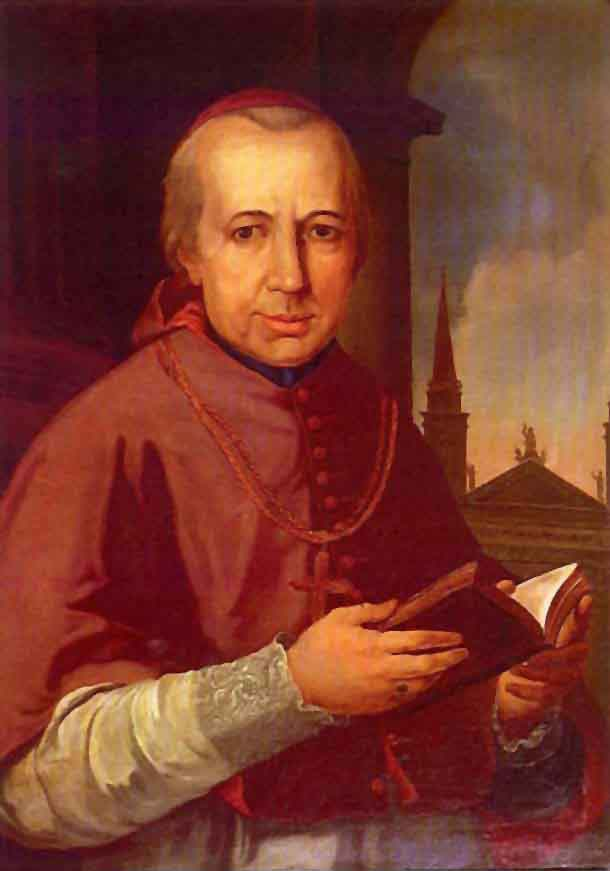
- János Szily (artist unknown)
- Church: Catholic Church
- Diocese: Diocese of Szombathely
- In office: 23 June 1777 – 2 January 1799
- Predecessor: Diocese erected
- Successor: Franziskus Herzan von Harras
- Previous posts: Bishop of Knin (1775-1777); Auxiliary Bishop of Győr (1775-1777)

Orders
- Ordination: 3 September 1758
- Consecration: 28 May 1775 by Ferenc Zichy

Personal details
- Born: 20 August 1735 Felszopor, Újkér, Kingdom of Hungary, Habsburg Empire
- Died: 2 January 1799 (aged 63) Szombathely, Kingdom of Hungary, Habsburg Empire

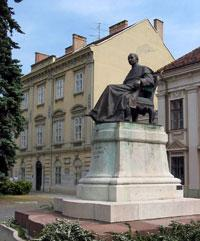
Statue of Szily in Szombathely by István Tóth

János Szily (20 August 1735, Felsőszopor - 2 June 1799, Szombathely) was a Hungarian Catholic bishop and patron of the arts.

== Biography ==
He was born to a Catholic father and a Lutheran mother. After completing his primary and secondary studies at Jesuit schools in Sopron, he embarked on an ecclesiastical career, which led him to the Collegium Germanicum et Hungaricum in Rome, where he was an honor student. During these years, he became a friend of the future Cardinal, Franziskus Herzan von Harras, from Bohemia. In 1757, he was ordained a Deacon by Cardinal Luigi Mattei at the Lateran Basilica. Upon returning to his homeland in 1758, he became Secretary to Ferenc Zichy, Bishop of the Diocese of Győr.

In 1775, Queen Maria Theresa of Austria nominated him to be Bishop of the Diocese of Knin. This was confirmed by the Vatican later that same year and he was consecrated by Bishop Zichy. Two years later, with the concurrence of Pope Pius VI, the Queen appointed him Bishop of the Diocese of Szombathely. He took up his new chair, on his birthday, in the presence of Primate József Batthyány.

As one of his first acts, he commissioned the scholar of ancient Jesuit history, István Schönvisner, to compile a general history of Savaria-Szombathely, which was published in Pest in 1791, with the title Antiquitatum et historiae Sabariensis ab origine usque ad praesens tempus. Savaria was the city's original Roman name.

With sketches and plans sent to him by his agents in Rome, he began a series of architectural projects; demolishing the ruins of the old fortifications, building a seminary (1777-1780), Bishop's palace (1780-1783) and a cathedral (1791-1797). For the execution and decoration of these buildings, he retained the services of several well known architects and artists; including Melchior Hefele, Stephan Dorfmeister, Franz Anton Maulbertsch and Josef Winterhalder.

He also promoted the interests of various Hungarian minorities; such as the Germans, Croats and Slovenes. In addition to founding schools, he donated a large sum to the writer, Miklós Küzmics, who translated the Bible into Prekmurje Slovene, thereby establishing a standard for that dialect.

== Sources ==
- Gyula Géfin, A Szombathelyi egyházmegye története (1777-1928) (History of the Diocese of Szombathely), 1929 (Online) @ Library Hungaricana
- A. F. Sill, "A személyiség szerepe Szily püspök alkotásaiban" (The Role of Personality in the Works of Bishop Szily), in Vas megyei levéltári füzetek (Vas County Archival Records), C/II (1993), pp. 15–25
- István. Szilágyi, "Szily János, a városépitô (1735-1799)" (János Szily, the City Builder), in Vasi Szemle, XLIV/1 (1990), pp. 63–67
- Konrad Eubel, Hierarchia Catholica Medii Aevi, Vol.6, pg.408 Online
