= István Küzmics =

István Küzmics (also known in Slovene as Štefan or Števan Küzmič, c.1723 – December 22, 1779) was the most critical Lutheran writer of the Slovenes in Hungary.

He was born at Strukovci, in the Prekmurje region of what was then Vas County, in the Kingdom of Hungary (now in Slovenia). His father György Küzmics (1703–1769) was a tailor. From 1733 to 1747 he went to school in Sopron and Győr, and studied at the lyceum in Pozsony (now Bratislava). He later became a pastor and teacher in the Slovene-speaking towns of Nemescsó (1751–1755) and Surd (1755–1779), in what is now Zala County, but was then part of Somogy, an area where many Slovene families settled in the 17th and 18th centuries. He also wrote catechisms and schoolbooks, and translated the New Testament into Prekmurje Slovene. The translated text, Nouvi zakon ali testamentom, was published in the German town of Halle in 1771. He died at Surd.

== Works ==
- Male szlovenszki katekizmus, 1752 (Little Slovene Catechism)
- ABC kni'snicza, 1753 (Primer)
- Vöre Krsztsanske krátki Návuk csiszte rejcsi Bo'ze vözebráni i na nyou, 1754 (Brief Doctrine of the Christian Religion)
- Nouvi Zákon ali Testamentom Gospodna nasega Jezusa Krisztusa zdaj oprvics zGrcskoga na sztári szlovenszki jezik obrnyeni po Stevan Küzmicsi Surdanszkom. F., 1771 (New Testament)

== See also ==
- Slovenes in Somogy
- Hungarian Slovenes
- Prekmurje
- Mihály Bakos
- List of Slovene writers and poets in Hungary
- Primož Trubar
