= Miklós Küzmics =

Hungarian Slovene writer and translator

Miklós Küzmics (Slovene: Mikloš Küzmič; September 15, 1737 – April 11, 1804) was a Hungarian Slovene priest, writer and translator.

== Biography ==
Küzmics was born in Dolnji Slaveči and died in Kančevci. His parents were János and Erzsébet Küsmics [sic]. He was trained as a school supervisor for the Slovene Catholic schools in Prekmurje.

He was ordained as a parish priest in 1763 and served in Felsőszentbenedek until his death.

Küzmics wrote the first bilingual textbook for the Hungarian Slovenes, entitled ABC knizsica narodni soul haszek (Elementary School Primer), which he translated from German into Hungarian and Slovene. This booklet, which contained the first Slovene-Hungarian dictionary, appeared in Buda in 1790.

He also translated the four Gospels into Prekmurje Slovene. The book was printed in 1804 in Szombathely as Szvéti Evangyeliomi.

A memorial plaque is set in the wall of the Church of St Benedict in Panovci.

Although they had the same surname, Miklós Küzmics was not related to István Küzmics, the most important Protestant writer and educator of the Hungarian Slovenes in Prekmurje.

== Works ==
- Krátká Summa Velikoga Katekizmussa, Sopron 1780 (Small Tenet of the Great Catechism)
- Szvéti evangyeliomi, 1780 (Holy Gospels)
- Szlovenszki Silabikar, 1780 (Slovene Service Book)
- Pomoucs Beté'snih, Mirajoucsih, 1781
- Kniga Molitvena, na haszek Szlovénszkegá národá, 1783 (Prayer Book for the Slovene Nation)
- ABC Kni'sicza na narodni soul haszek, Büdin 1790 (The Alphabet Booklet in Favor of the Nationality Schools)
- Sztárogá i nouvogá Testamentumé svéte histórie Kratke Summa, Szombathely 1796 (Small Tenet of the Holy Histories of the Old and New Testament)

== See also ==
- List of Slovene writers and poets in Hungary
- Mihály Gáber
