= Žitkovci =

Žitkovci Zsitkóc
- Location in Slovenia
- Coordinates: 46°38′33.26″N 16°22′29.11″E
- Country: Slovenia
- Traditional region: Prekmurje
- Statistical region: Mura
- Municipality: Dobrovnik

Area
  - Total: 5.07 km^{2} (1.96 sq mi)
- Elevation: 167 m (548 ft)

Population (2020)
  - Total: 113
  - Density: 22.3/km^{2} (57.7/sq mi)

Žitkovci (pronounced [ˈʒiːtkɔu̯tsi]; Hungarian: Zsitkóc) is a village in the Municipality of Dobrovnik in the Prekmurje region of Slovenia.

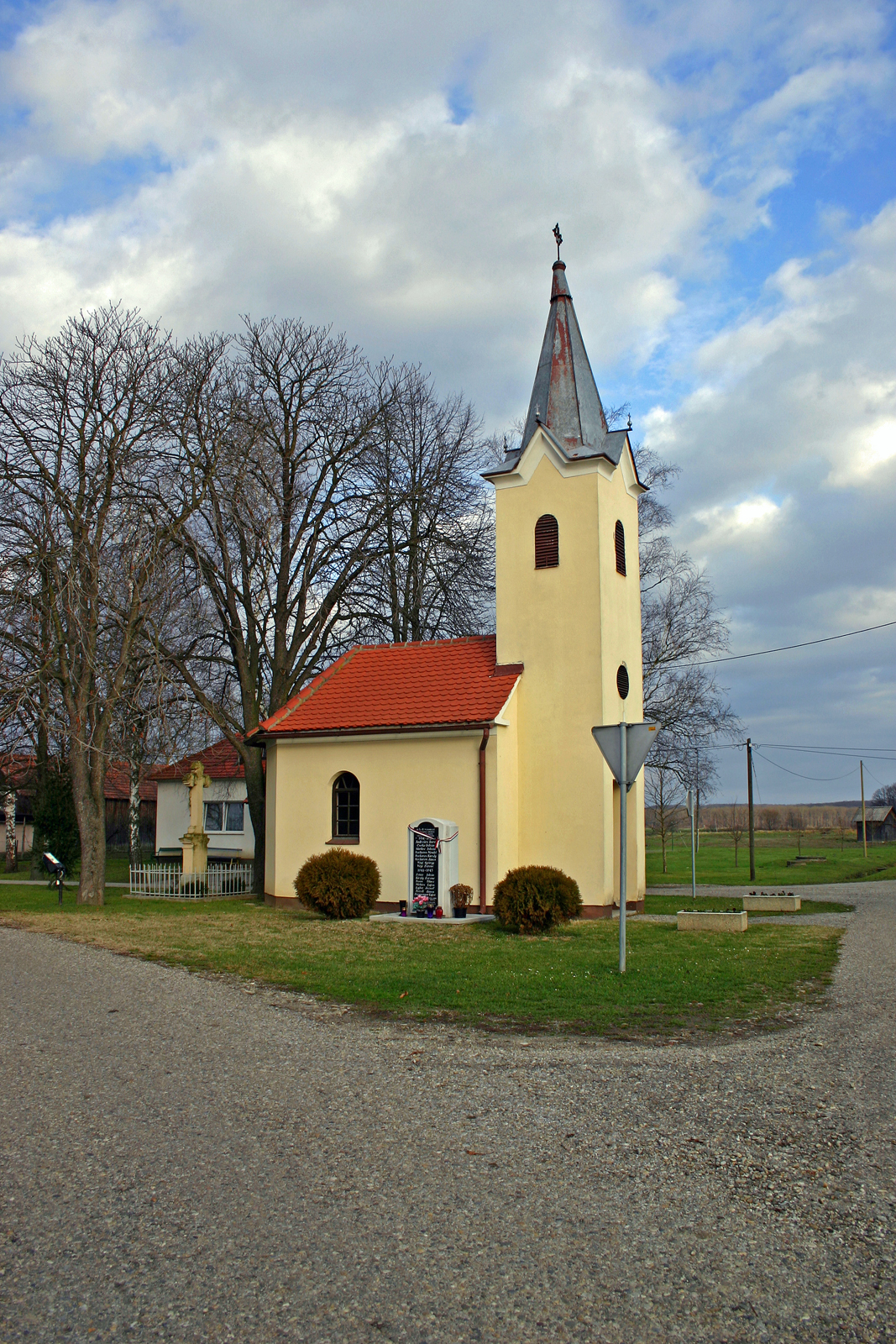
St. Florian's Chapel

The small church in the settlement is dedicated to Saint Florian and belongs to the Parish of Dobrovnik.
