= Strehovci =

Strehovci Őrszentvid
- Location in Slovenia
- Coordinates: 46°39′37.47″N 16°19′10.34″E
- Country: Slovenia
- Traditional region: Prekmurje
- Statistical region: Mura
- Municipality: Dobrovnik

Area
  - Total: 6.96 km^{2} (2.69 sq mi)
- Elevation: 175.9 m (577 ft)

Population (2020)
  - Total: 223
  - Density: 32.0/km^{2} (83.0/sq mi)

Strehovci (pronounced [ˈstɾeːxɔu̯tsi]; Hungarian: Őrszentvid) is a village in the Municipality of Dobrovnik in the Prekmurje region of Slovenia.

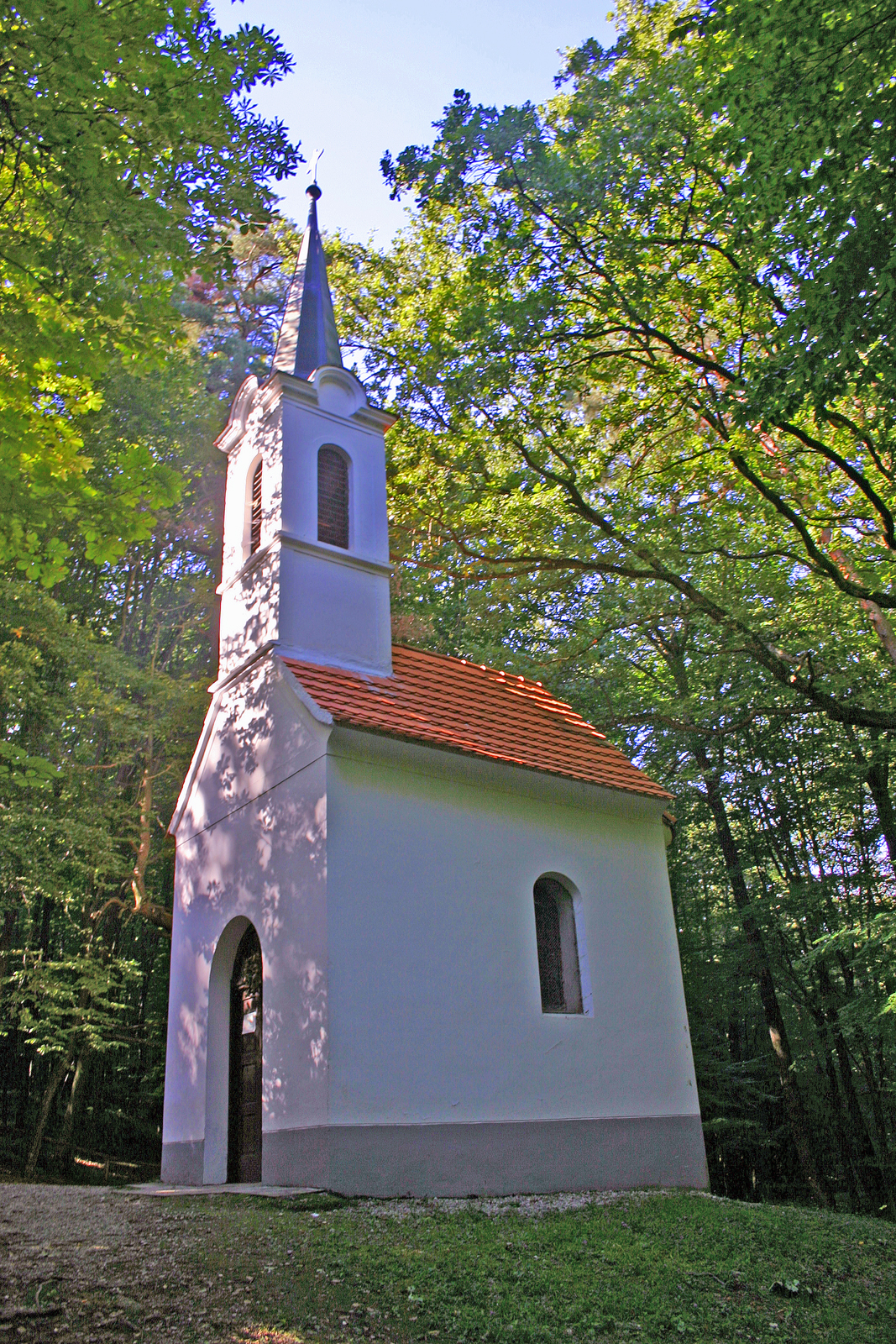
St. Vitus's Chapel

A chapel is built in the hills to the north of the main settlement and is dedicated to Saint Vitus. It belongs to the Parish of Bogojina.
