= European Green Belt =

European environmental initiative

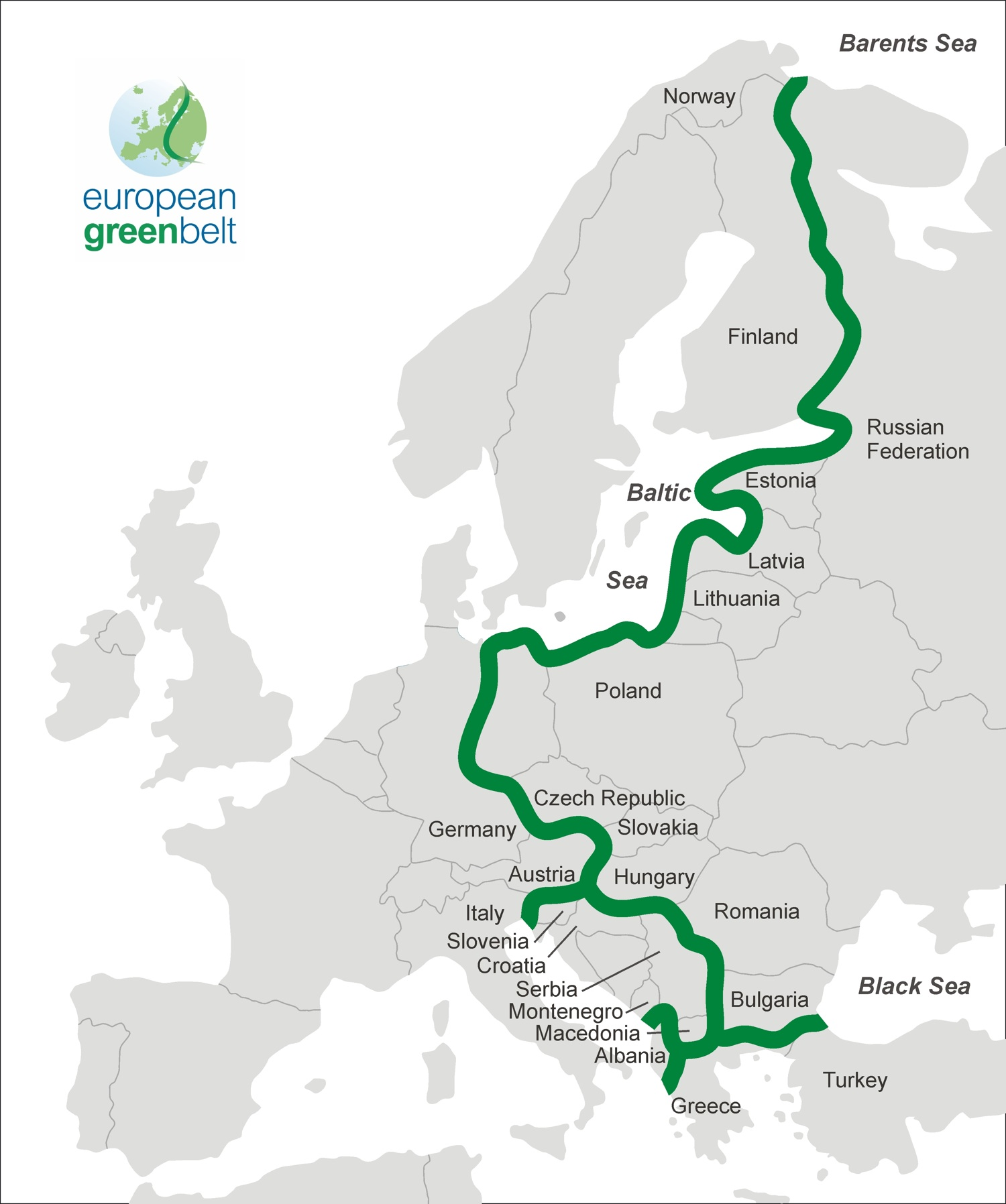
Route of the European Green Belt

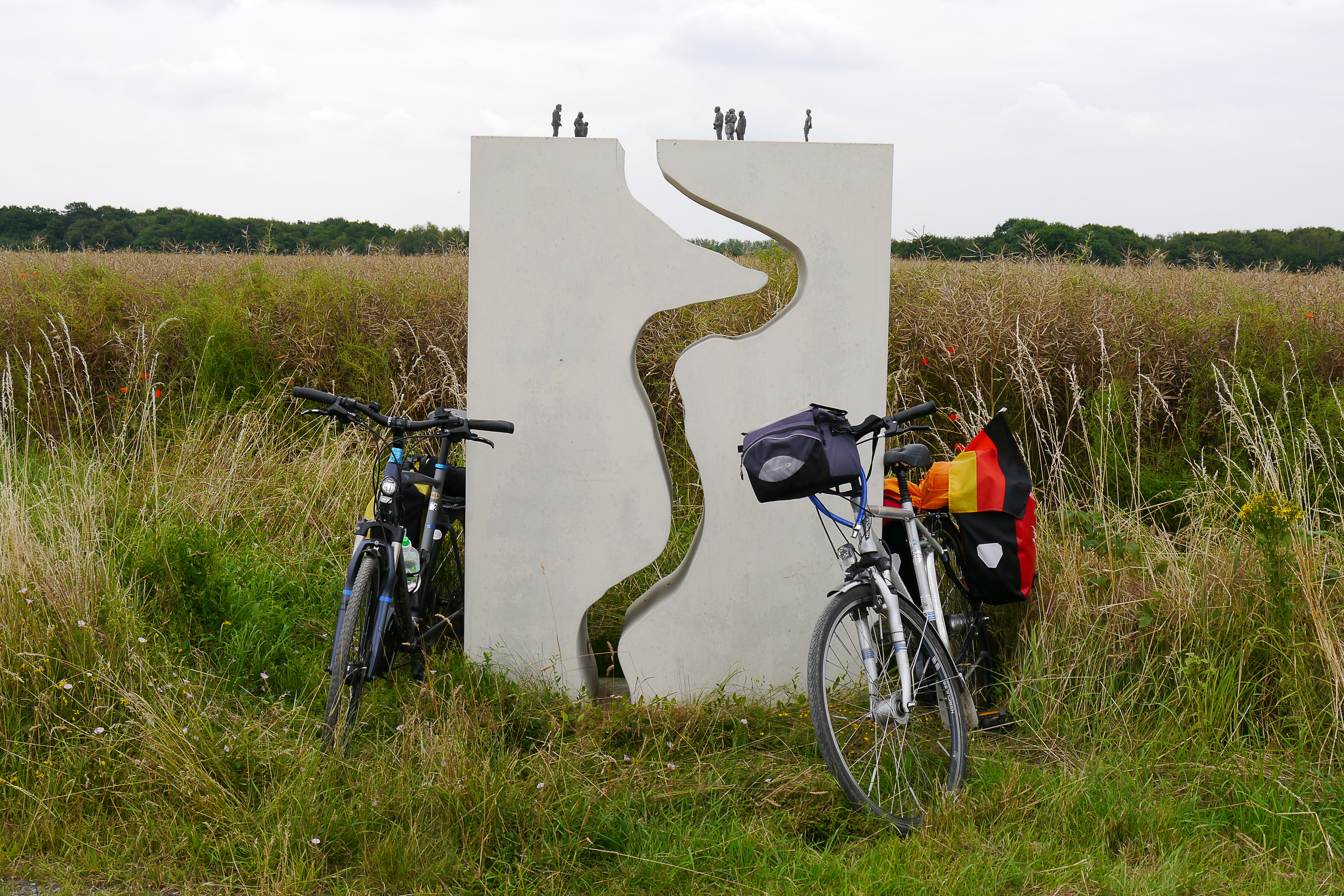
Art on the Green Belt, in the area that divided the former East and West Germany. The art installation "Meeting" (German: Begegnung) was created in 2010 and was placed next to the bike path

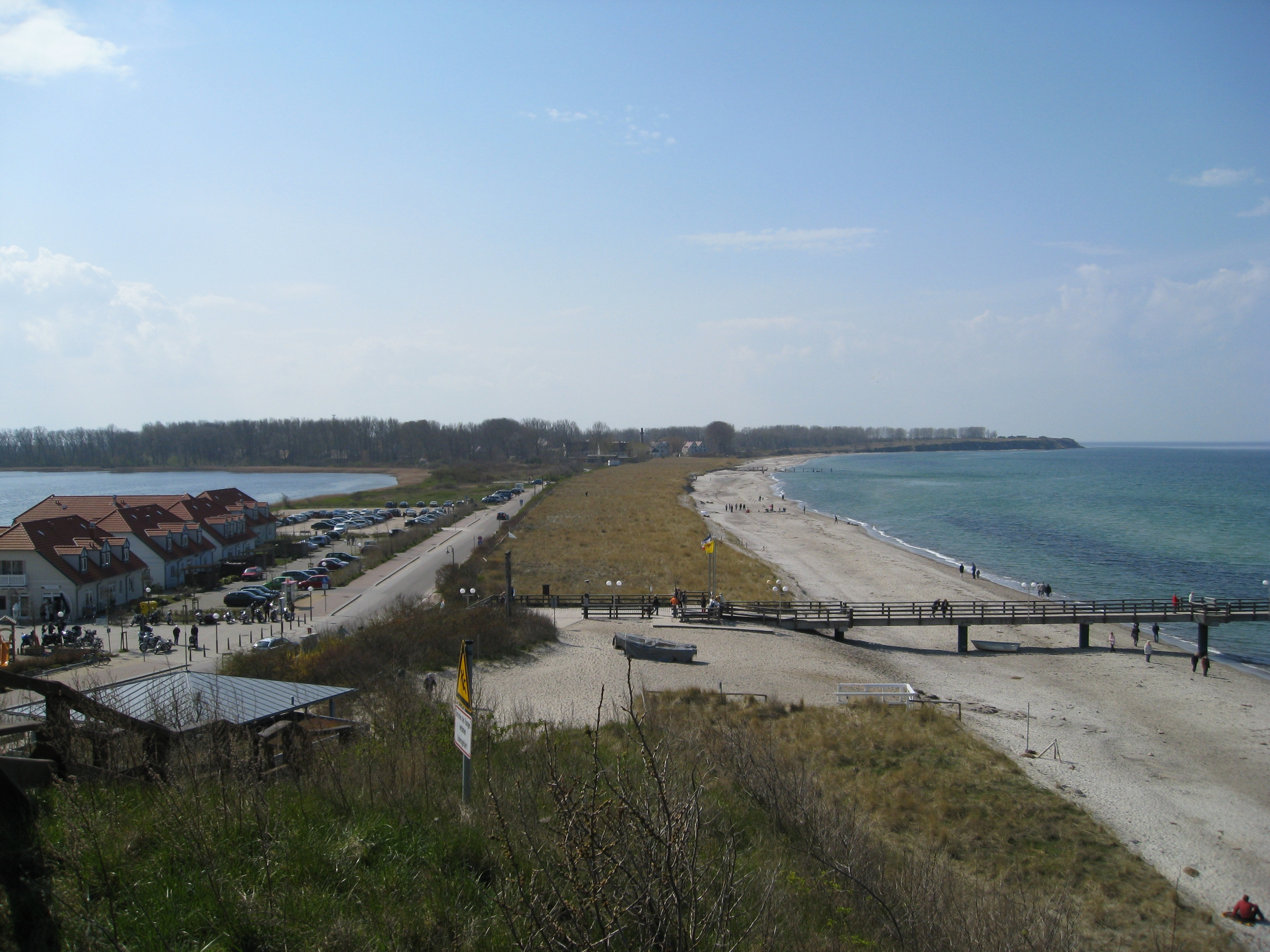
View to the town of Rerik on the Wustrow Peninsula, on the German Baltic Sea coast. The peninsula was mined during Nazi times and was a recreation area during GDR times. Many hotels were built by the FDGB holiday service

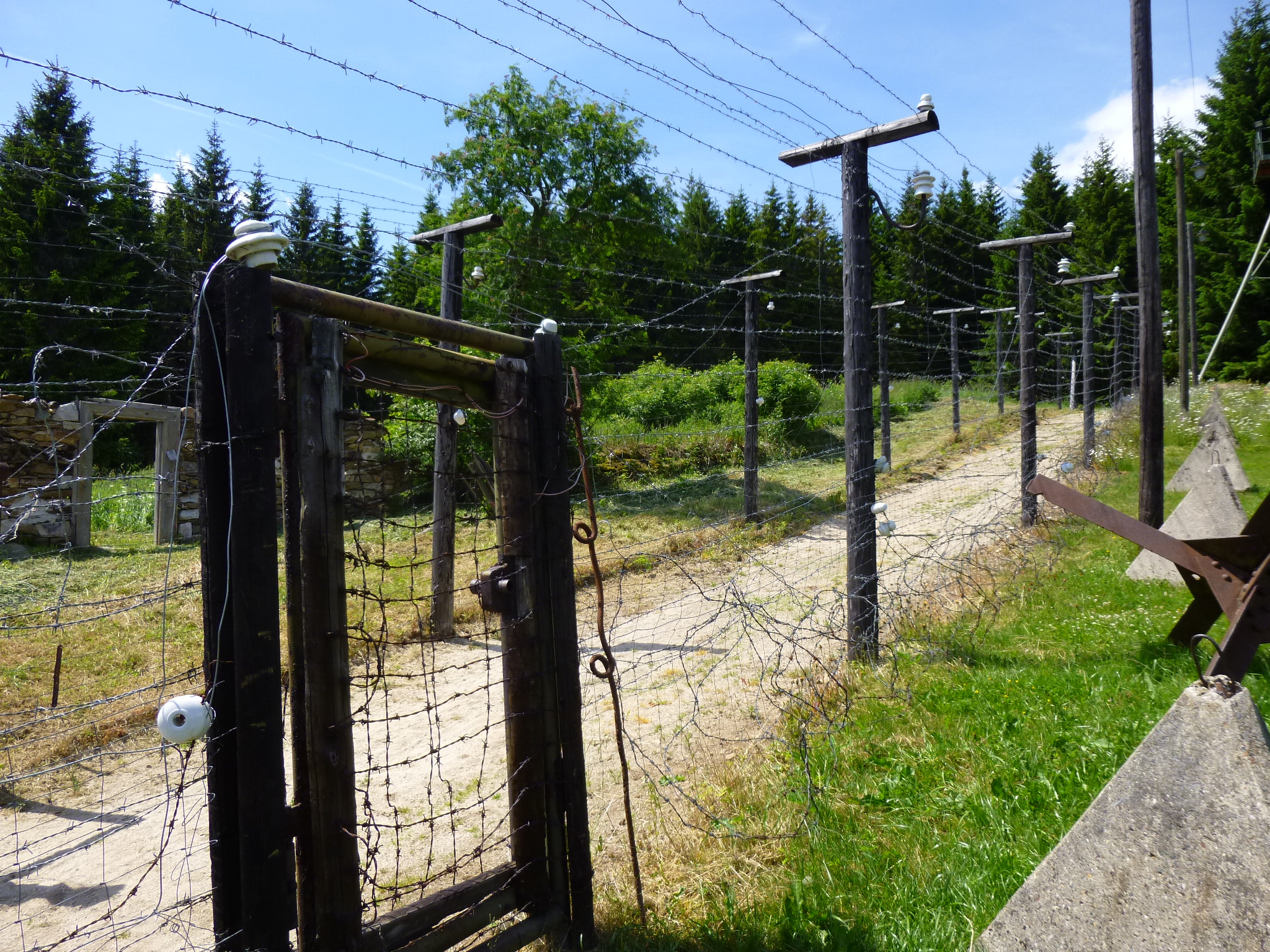
Šumava National Park in the Czech Republic, on the border with Germany and the Bavarian Forest National Park. Monument to the Iron Curtain not far from the border crossing

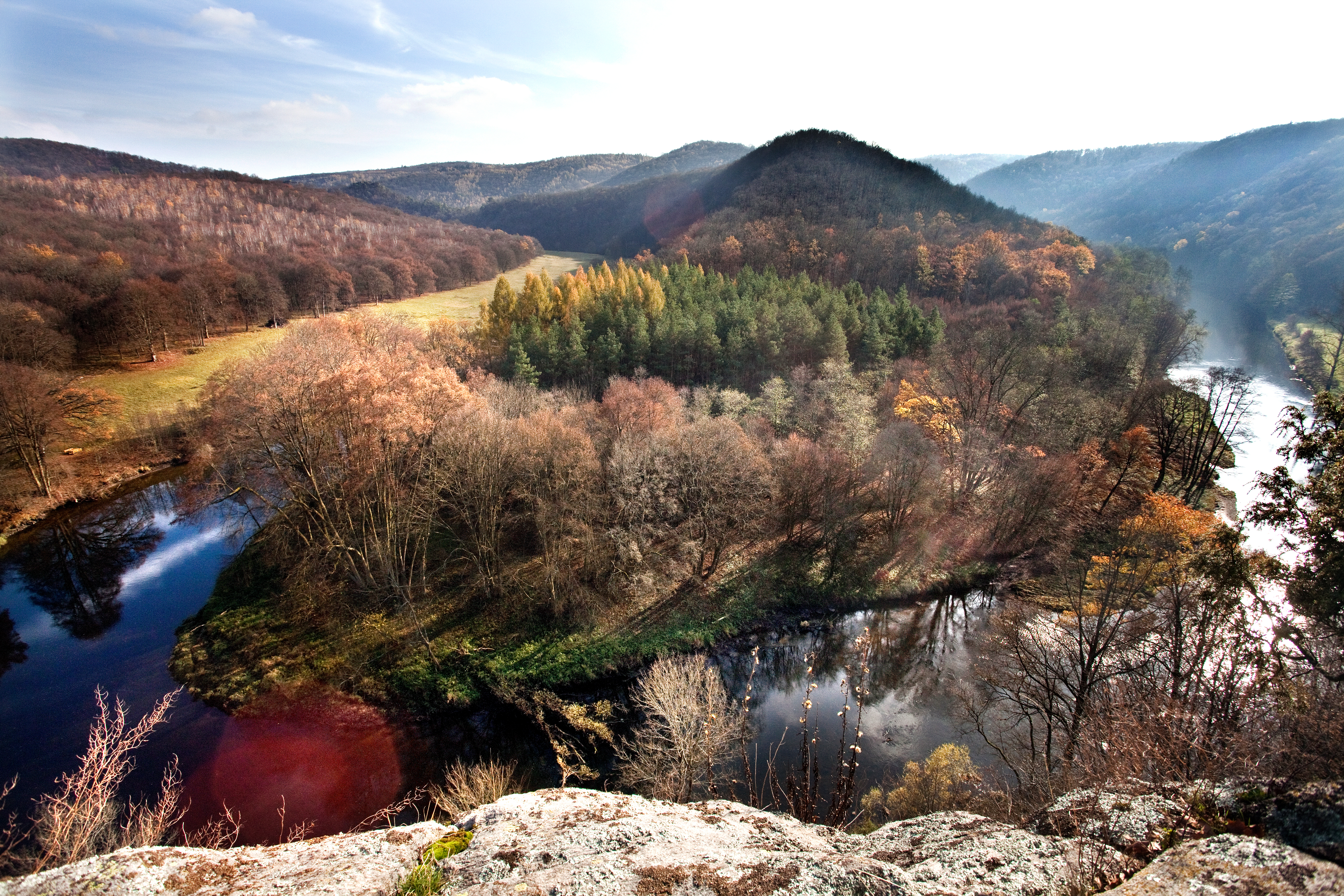
Thayatal National Park in Austria, on the border with the Czech Republic

The European Green Belt initiative is a grassroots movement for nature conservation and sustainable development along the corridor of the former Iron Curtain. The term refers to an environmental initiative as well as the area it concerns. The initiative is carried out under the patronage of the International Union for Conservation of Nature and formerly Mikhail Gorbachev. It is the aim of the initiative to create the backbone of an ecological network that runs from the Barents to the Black and Adriatic Seas.

The European Green Belt as an area follows the route of the former Iron Curtain and connects national parks, nature parks, biosphere reserves and transboundary protected areas as well as non-protected valuable habitats along or across the (former) borders.

== Background ==
In 1970, satellite pictures showed a dark green belt of old-growth forest on the Finnish-Russian border. In the early 1980s, biologists discovered that the inner German border zone between Bavaria in the west and Thuringia in the east was a refuge for several rare bird species which had disappeared from the intensely used areas covering most of Central Europe. The reasoning behind this observation was that negative human impact on the environment is smaller in such border zones which are commonly closed to public access and thus wildlife is minimally impacted by human activities.

After the end of the Cold War in 1991, the strict border regimes were abandoned and the border zones gradually opened, starting with the German reunification in 1990 and continuing with the step-by-step integration of new member states into the Schengen Treaty as part of the enlargement process of the European Union. At the same time, large military facilities such as training grounds and military research establishments in or close to the border zones were closed down. For most cases, it was unclear whom these lands belonged to and thus what the fate of the valuable landscapes would be. Against this background, the conservation initiative Green Belt formed to conserve the natural assets along the former Iron Curtain.

== Route ==
The route of the Green Belt follows the course of the borders which during the second half of the 20th century divided the eastern European communist countries and the western capitalist countries. It is divided into four regional sections:

- Fennoscandian Green Belt: Norway, Finland, Russia.
- Baltic Green Belt: Estonia, Latvia, Russia and Lithuania.
- Central European Green Belt: Poland, Germany (the inner German border), Czech Republic, Slovakia, Austria, Hungary, Slovenia, Croatia and Italy
- Balkan (or South Eastern European) Green Belt: Serbia, Montenegro, Kosovo, Bulgaria, Romania, North Macedonia, Albania, Greece and Turkey

== History ==
The historical starting point of the initiative was the Green Belt Resolution of Hof (Germany) in December 1989, one month after the fall of the Berlin Wall. This document formulated and signed by more than 300 environmentalists from the German Democratic Republic and the Federal Republic of Germany initiated the first conservation projects targeting the inner German border. After several achievements, the idea was taken to the European level. After a first conference on the European Green Belt in 2003, it was decided to establish a working group with the World Conservation Union (IUCN) as overall coordinator for its implementation; IUCN together with the Ferto-Hanság National Park in Hungary organized the first meeting of the working group, which took place 9–12 September 2004. In the following years, the working group together with stakeholders of the Green Belt elaborated a Programme of Work and proposed representatives in each country along the Green Belt to be officially appointed as National Green Belt Focal Points by their respective Ministries of Environment. A Memorandum of Understanding to jointly protect the Green Belt in Fennoscandia was signed by the Environmental Ministers of Russia, Finland and Norway in 2010. In November 2010, the Binding Award for outstanding contributions to nature conservation was awarded to five individuals for their continuous engagement in protecting the Green Belt.

For several years there have been considerations to nominate the European Green Belt as a UNESCO World Heritage Site.

== Organisational structure ==
The initiative's network consists of official representatives for the three regions named above (Regional Coordinators) and for each country (National Focal Points) appointed during the first European Green Belt meeting in 2003:

- Fennoscandian Green Belt: Association of Reserves and National Parks of Russian North-West (Baltic Fund for Nature)
- Central European Green Belt: Bund Naturschutz Bayern (Friends of the Earth Germany)
- Balkan or South Eastern European Green Belt: EuroNatur

The implementation of the Green Belt vision in the regions is carried out by several hundred stakeholders from nature conservation and sustainable development who contribute either on a project or voluntary basis.

== Ecological values ==
Observations by biologists revealed that the military practice along the borderline led to wildlife conservation in numerous ways:

- A ban on pesticide spraying has preserved many rare insects.
- Keeping the vegetation cut so border guards can see across easily stopped the area from becoming continuous forest and thus preserved wildlife needing open land.
- One peculiar occurrence noticed was that in a forested part of this belt on the frontier between Bavaria and Bohemia, 18 years after the border barrier was removed, forest deer still refused to cross the frontier: compare hefting of livestock.
- Old landmine explosion craters have become wildlife ponds.
- In the Bulgaria/Greece section there are many eastern imperial eagle nests.
- Where the River Drava is the frontier between Hungary and Croatia, mutual mistrust prevented river development works, so the river and its banks are still natural, including the river creating sand cliffs where sand martins nest. The Drava has cut off meanders, leaving many bits of each nation's territory on the wrong side of the river; these areas are not farmed and have become wildlife areas.
- Along the coast of the Mecklenburg area, restricted access, to stop people from crossing over by boat or swimming, helped to preserve coastal wildlife.

== Cultural values ==
It has been proposed to develop not only the natural but also the cultural heritage of the Soviet period: following the idea to link the numerous historical initiatives, installations, projects and relics in the Green Belt with the natural heritage, in order to turn the European Green Belt into living historical monument of the Cold War during the 20th century. In the context of the European Green Belt, cultural heritage has been assessed and/ or developed in several places already:

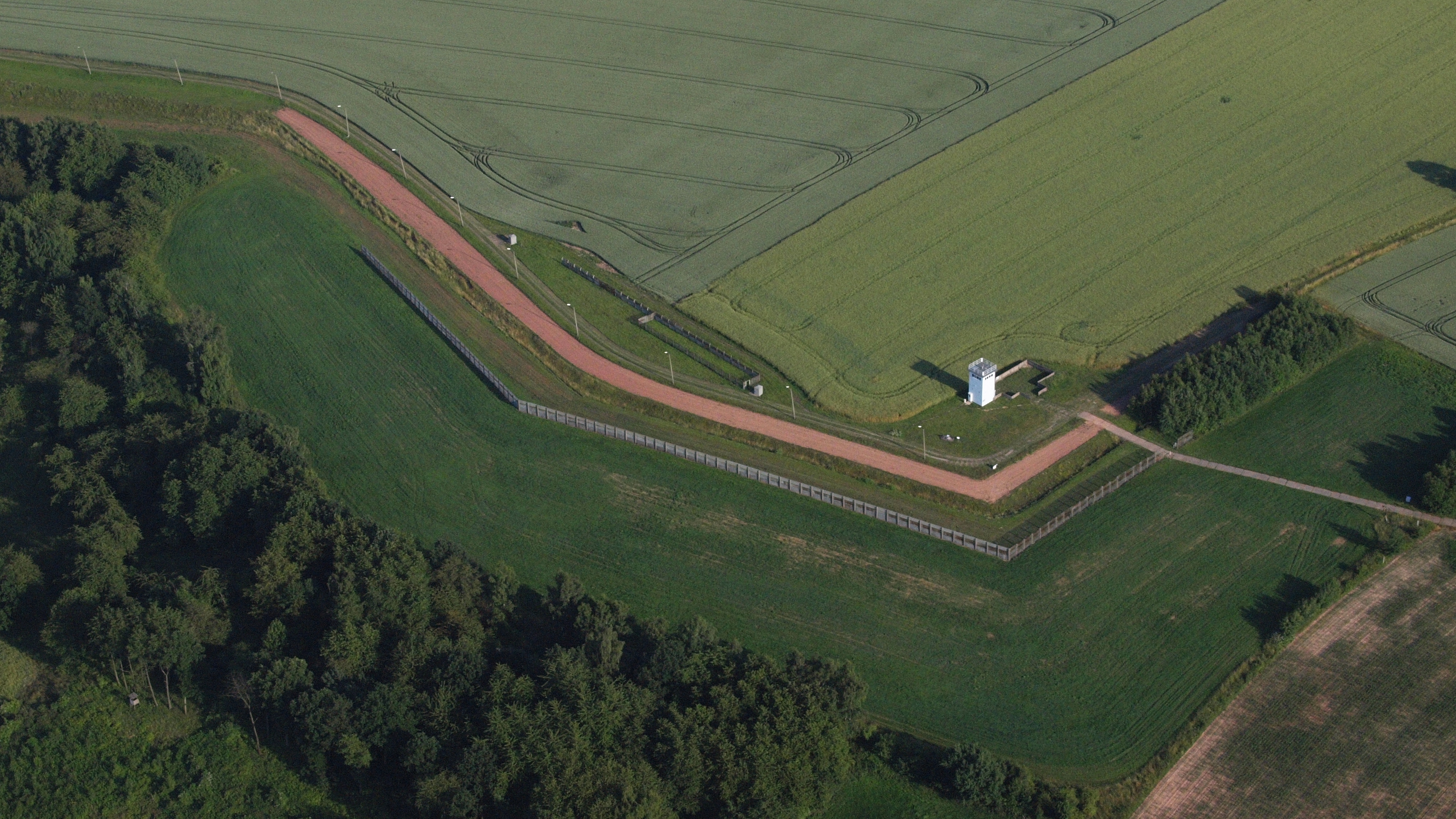
A hiking trail at the Borderland Museum Eichsfeld leads along preserved parts of the inner-German border. The trail features information panels about the border.

- The permanent exhibition at the Borderland Museum Eichsfeld in Central Germany provides information about the European Green Belt. A hiking trail leads along the former Iron Curtain, where the visitors can take a look at preserved parts of the original border facilities.
- On mount Brocken, Germany, the former border patrol path has been turned into a hiking route called the "Harz border path"
- In the Slovenian Nature Park Goričko, border stones with information plates have been set up which inform visitors, about the history of the Iron Curtain and the natural values in place due to this history
- Military heritage along the Latvian Green Belt has been assessed and compiled in a data base and map for visitors, including almost 100 stories of contemporary witnesses

== See also ==
- German Green Belt
- Iron Curtain Trail, a project to complete a long-distance cycling route in the EGB corridor.
- Korean DMZ Nature Reserve; the DMZ between the two Koreas has created an involuntary park, and since 1966 there have been proposals to turn it into a proper nature reserve
