= Mária Pozsonec =

Slovenian politician

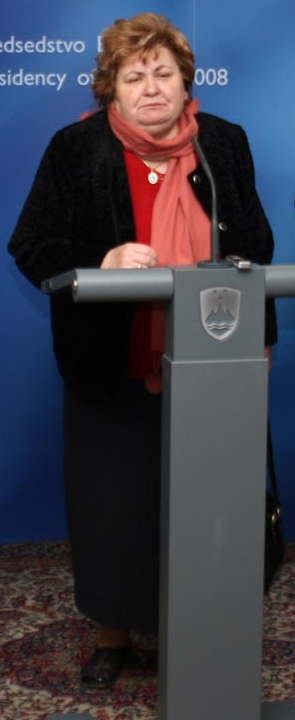
Mária Pozsonec (2008)

Mária Pozsonec (16 January 1940 – 3 April 2017) was a Slovenian politician of Hungarian ethnicity. Between 1990 and 2008, she served as representative of the Hungarian national community in the National Assembly of Slovenia.

She was born to Hungarian parents in the village of Dolga Vas (Hungarian: Hosszúfalu) near Lendava, in what was then the Drava Banovina of the Kingdom of Yugoslavia (now in Slovenia). She attended the high school in Subotica (Serbia), and studied pedagogy at the University of Maribor, in Slovenia. She worked as an elementary school teacher in her native region of Prekmurje. During the 1980s, she emerged as an activist of the Hungarian minority in Slovenia.

In the first free elections in Slovenia in April 1990, she was elected to the National Assembly as the representative of the Hungarian national community. She was re-elected four times, in 1992, 1996, 2000, and 2004. In 2008, she was defeated by László Göncz.

She served as vice-mayor of Lendava from November 2006 till November 2011.

Pozsonec died on 3 April 2017 at the age of 77.
