= Dobrovnik =

Dobrovnik Dobronak (Hungarian)
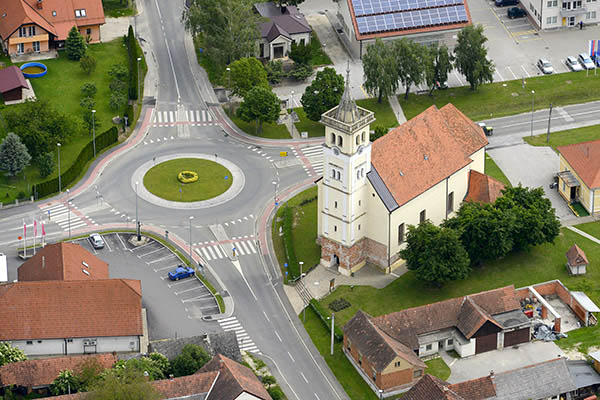

- Location in Slovenia
- Coordinates: 46°39′5.51″N 16°20′52.56″E
- Country: Slovenia
- Traditional region: Prekmurje
- Statistical region: Mura
- Municipality: Dobrovnik

Area
  - Total: 19.1 km^{2} (7.4 sq mi)
- Elevation: 172.3 m (565 ft)

Population (2020)
  - Total: 948
  - Density: 49.6/km^{2} (129/sq mi)
- Postal code: 9223 Dobrovnik

Dobrovnik (pronounced [dɔˈbɾɔ́ːwnik]; Hungarian: Dobronak, pronounced [ˈdobronɒk]) is a village in Slovenia and is the seat of the Municipality of Dobrovnik. It is located in the Prekmurje region. It has a significant Hungarian ethnic community.

== Name ==
Dobrovnik was attested in written sources in 1322 as Dobronok (and as Dobronuk in 1322/35, and as Drobronak and Dabronuk in 1323). The early Slavic form of the name was *Dǫbrovъnikъ, derived from *dǫbrova 'oak woods, deciduous woods'.

== History ==
Early settlement of the area is attested by the discovery of a prehistoric stone chisel and 21 burial mounds south of the village. Excavations of the burial mounds have revealed cremation burials from the 1st and 3rd centuries AD as well as pottery, glass, and metal items.

Dobrovnik was first mentioned in written sources dating to 1270. It was mentioned as a market in 1334 in connection with the Bánffy estates. There were 21 farms in the village in 1381. The market was fortified with trenches and there was also a castle in the 16th century. Dobrovnik was burned in an Ottoman attack in 1502. The continued threat of Ottoman attacks resulted in very slow development of the settlement over the next two centuries.

A parish school was established before 1669, when a visitation report stated that there was a teacher but no pupils in the village. In 1747 the entire village was badly damaged in a fire. Another parish school was reestablished in 1838; instruction took place in the rectory and in private houses until a school building was built in 1856. After the abolition of serfdom in 1848, the large states were broken up and the population grew significantly. A fire station was established in Dobrovnik in 1910.

=== Clandestine graves ===
Dobrovnik is the site of five known clandestine graves from the end of the Second World War, each containing the remains of a German soldier killed in April 1945 during the German withdrawal and Red Army advance. The Štihthaber Grave (Slovene: Grob pri Štihthaberjevih) lies in the woods 1.8 kilometers (1.1 mi) northeast of the church. The Pap-Hegy Crossroads Grave (Grob pri križišču za Pap-hegy), also known as the Popov Breg Grave (Grob Popov breg), is located in an abandoned gravel pit about 750 meters (2,460 ft) north of the church. The Pap-Hegy Göntér Cellar Grave (Grob pri Göntérjevi kleti Pap-hegy) lies on the edge of a vineyard about 1.1 kilometers (0.68 mi) north-northeast of the church. The Szent Janos Grave (Grob Szent Janos) is located about 1 kilometer (0.62 mi) north-northwest of the church, below a large oak tree near a field above Bukovnica Creek. The Bank Grave (Grob pri banki) lies in the middle of the settlement, under asphalt paving between a meadow and the former bank (at Dobrovnik no. 298).

== Church ==
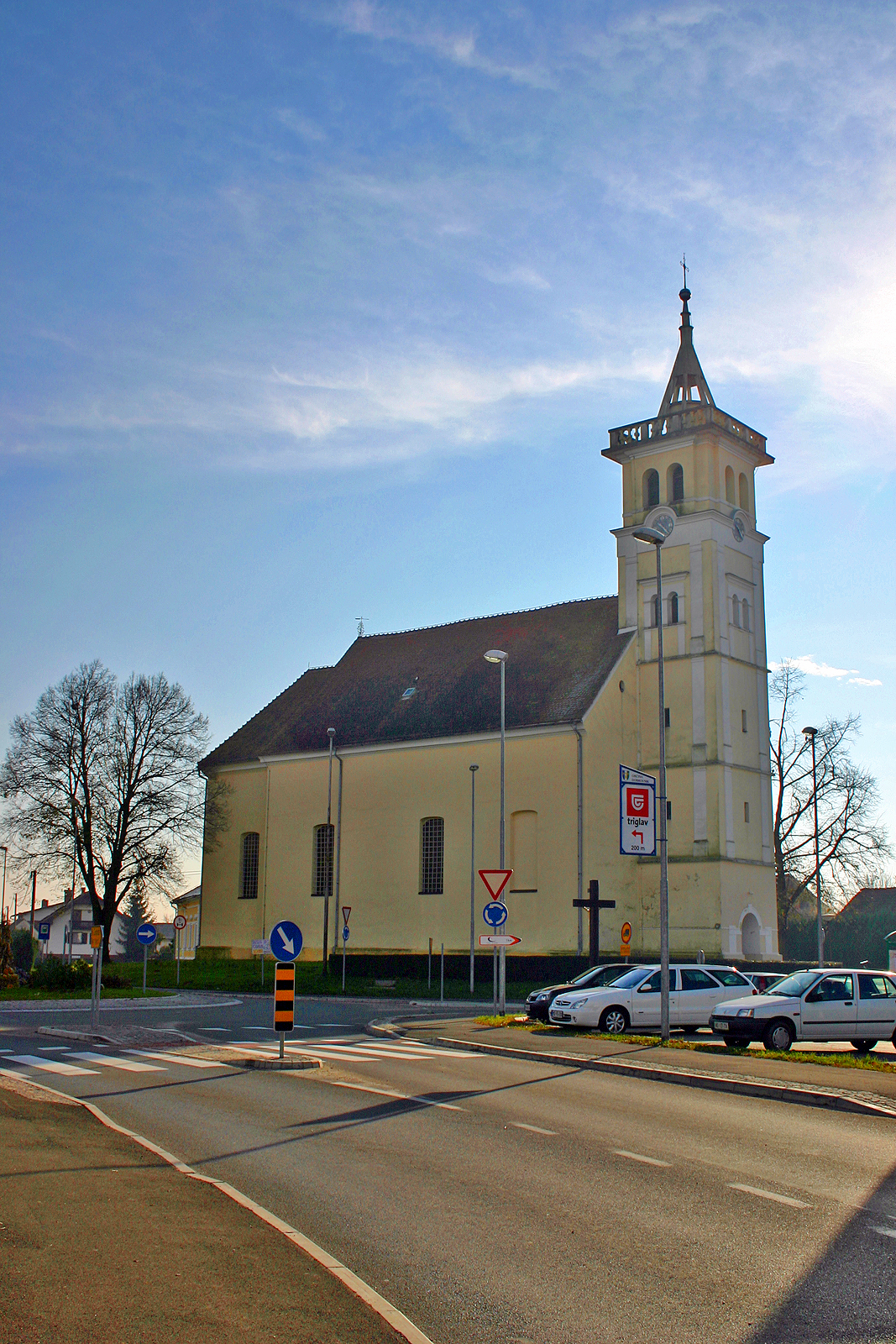
St. James's Church in Dobrovnik (2006)

A church dedicated to Saint James was mentioned in Dobrovnik in 1334. A second church was built in 1668, and was damaged in the fire of 1747. A new church was built between 1794 and 1796. Like its predecessors, it is dedicated to Saint James and belongs to the Murska Sobota Diocese. The church also has a Calvary shrine created by the painter Lajči Pandur (1913–1973), a cemetery, and a cemetery chapel.

== Notable people ==
Notable people that were born or lived in Dobrovnik include:

- Evgen Car (born 1944), theater actor and playwright
- Žiga Laci (born 2002), professional football player
