= László Göncz =

Slovenian politician and historian (born 1960)

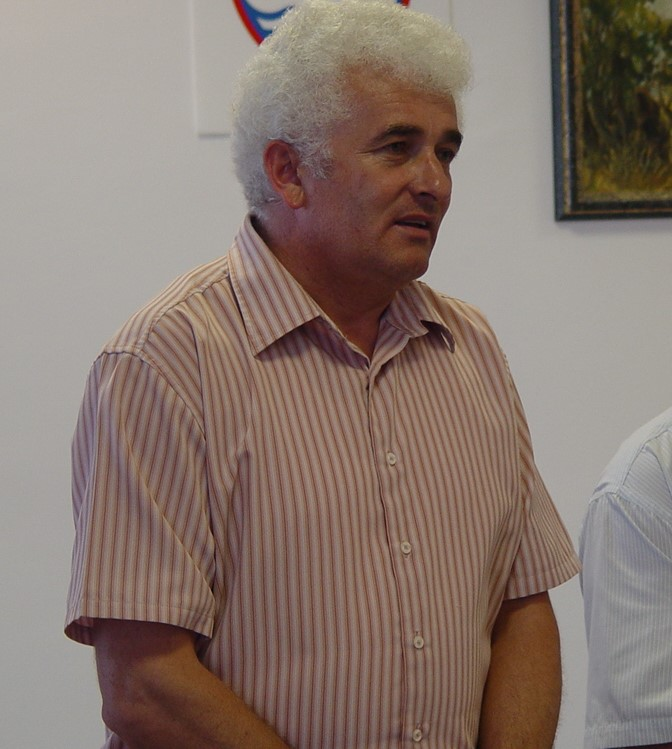
László Göncz in 2007

László Göncz (born 13 April 1960) is a Hungarian historian and politician in Slovenia. He is currently serving in the National Assembly of the Republic of Slovenia as the official representative of the Hungarian national community in Slovenia.

He was born in Murska Sobota, then part of the Socialist Republic of Slovenia in former Yugoslavia. He spent his childhood in the bilingual border town of Lendava, where he attended elementary school. He studied history at the University of Pécs in Hungary. Throughout the 1990s and 2000s, he worked as a historian and cultural activist of the Hungarian minority in the region of Prekmurje. In the Slovenian parliamentary election of 2008, he was elected to the Slovenian National Assembly in the 9th electoral unit, reserved for registered members of the Hungarian minority in Slovenia, defeating the incumbent candidate Mária Pozsonec who had served as the representative of the Hungarian minority in the Slovenian Parliament for the past 18 years. On 4 December 2011, he defeated Dušan Orban in 2011 Slovenian parliamentary election.
