= Municipality of Dobrovnik =

Municipality of Slovenia

Municipality of Dobrovnik Občina Dobrovnik Dobronak község
- Municipality
- Location of the Municipality of Dobrovnik in Slovenia
- Coordinates: 46°39′N 16°21′E
- Country: Slovenia

Government
  - Mayor: Marjan Kardinar (LDS)

Area
  - Total: 31.1 km^{2} (12.0 sq mi)

Population (2008)
  - Total: 1,332
  - Density: 42.8/km^{2} (111/sq mi)
- Time zone: UTC+01 (CET)
  - Summer (DST): UTC+02 (CEST)
- Website: www.dobrovnik.si

The Municipality of Dobrovnik (Slovene: Občina Dobrovnik [ˈóːptʃina dɔˈbɾɔ́ːwnik]; Hungarian: Dobronak község [ˈdobronɒk ˈkøʃʃeːɡ]) is a municipality in Slovenia. The seat of the municipality is Dobrovnik (Hungarian: Dobronak). It is located in the Prekmurje region. It has a significant Hungarian ethnic community that outnumbers the Slovenes. Dobrovnik is one of the two municipalities in Slovenia where ethnic Slovenes form a minority of the population, the other being Hodoš (Hungarian: Őrihodos).

== Settlements ==
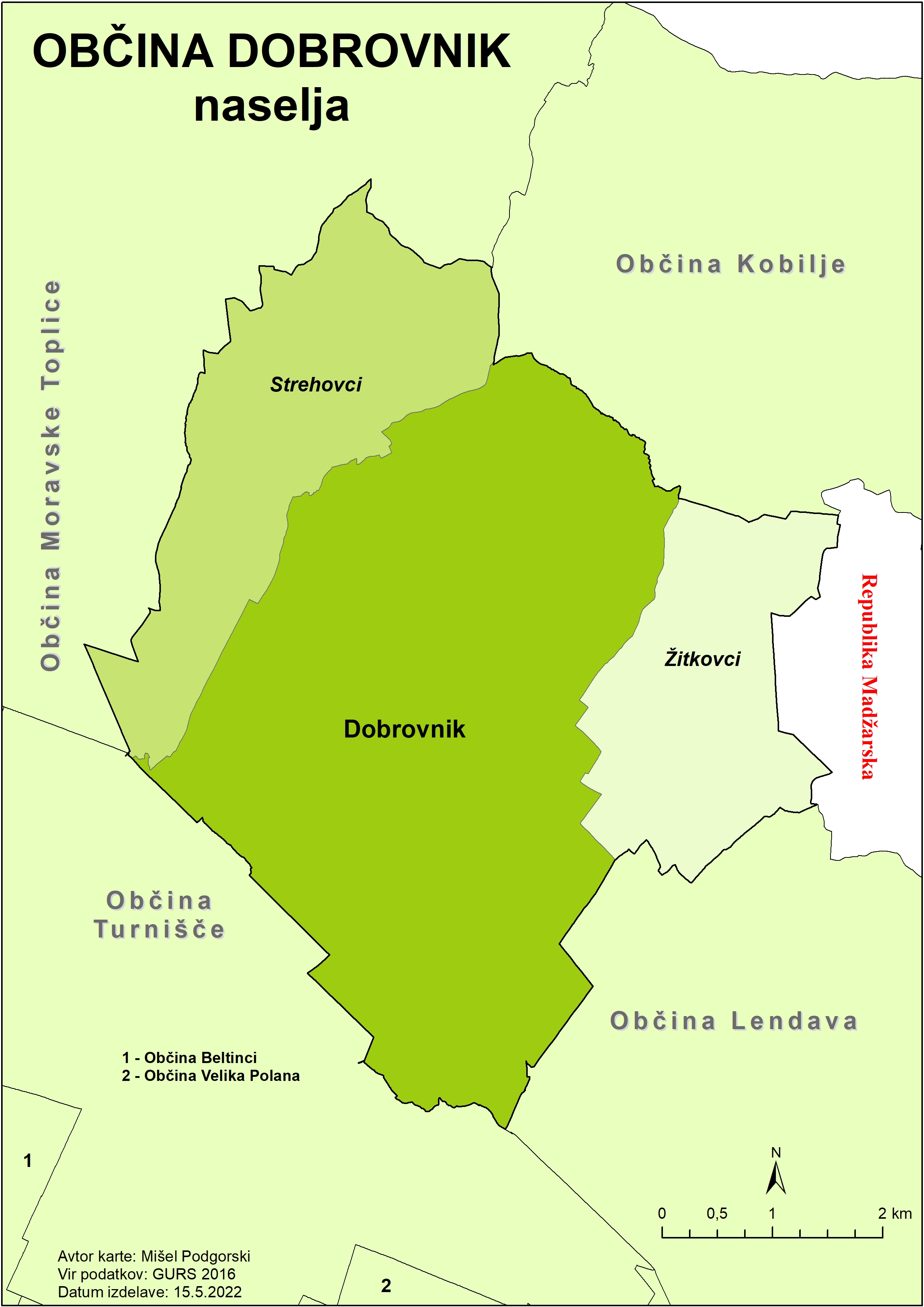
Villages in the municipality

In addition to the municipal seat of Dobrovnik, the municipality also includes the settlements of Strehovci and Žitkovci.

== Demographics ==
Population by native language, 2002 census

| Hungarian | 675 (51.6%) |
| Slovene | 551 (44.6%) |
| Others and unknown | 71 (5.43%) |
| Total | 1,307 |
