= Prekmurje =

Traditional region of Slovenia

Coordinates: 46°42′0″N 16°12′0″E

- Traditional region
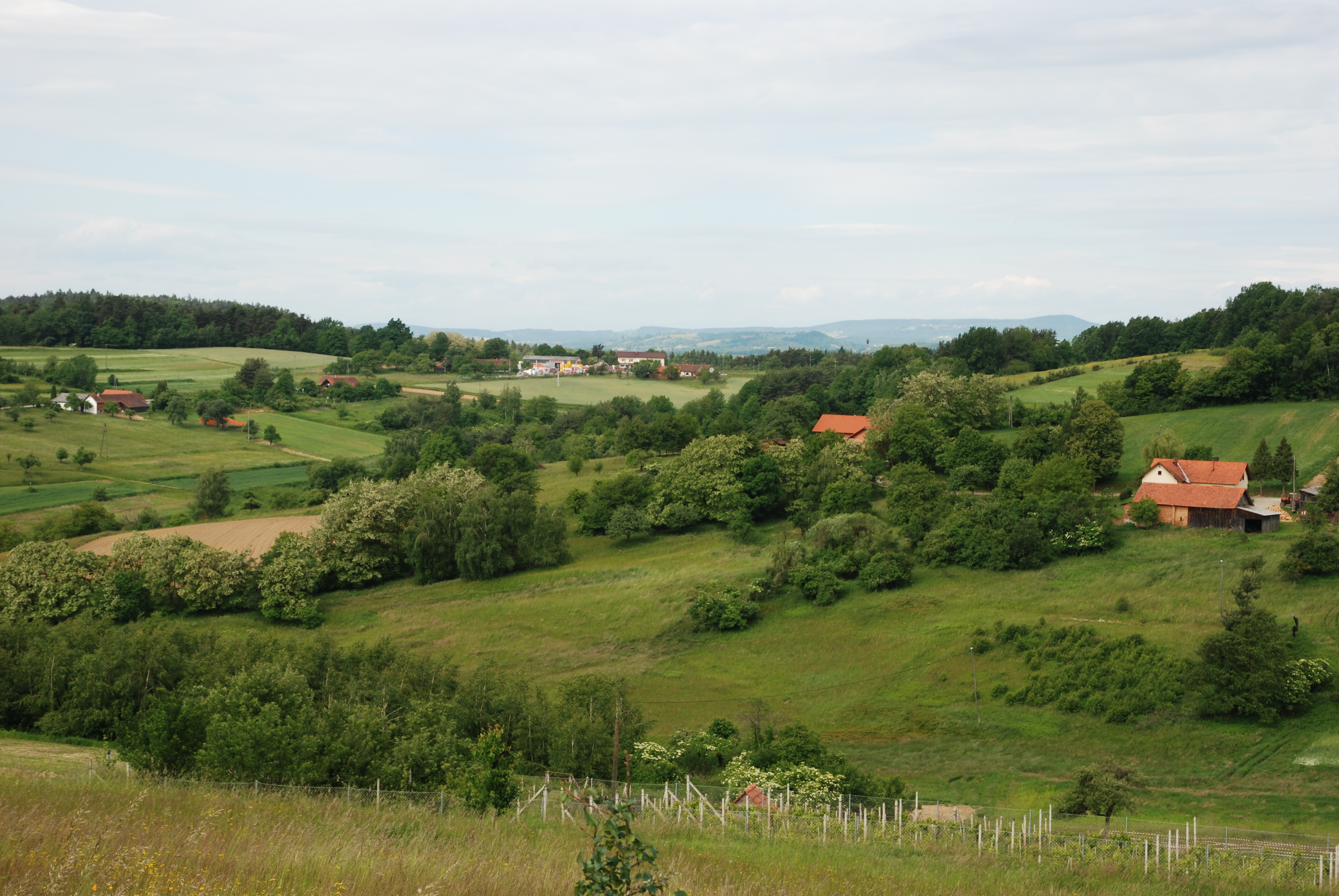
- Typical Prekmurje rural landscape in Goričko

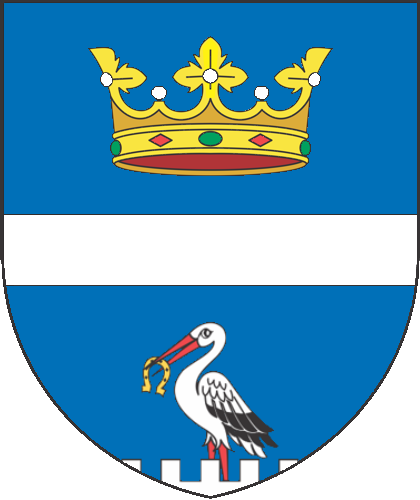
- Coat of arms
- Interactive map of Prekmurje
- Country: Slovenia

Area
  - Total: 938 km^{2} (362 sq mi)

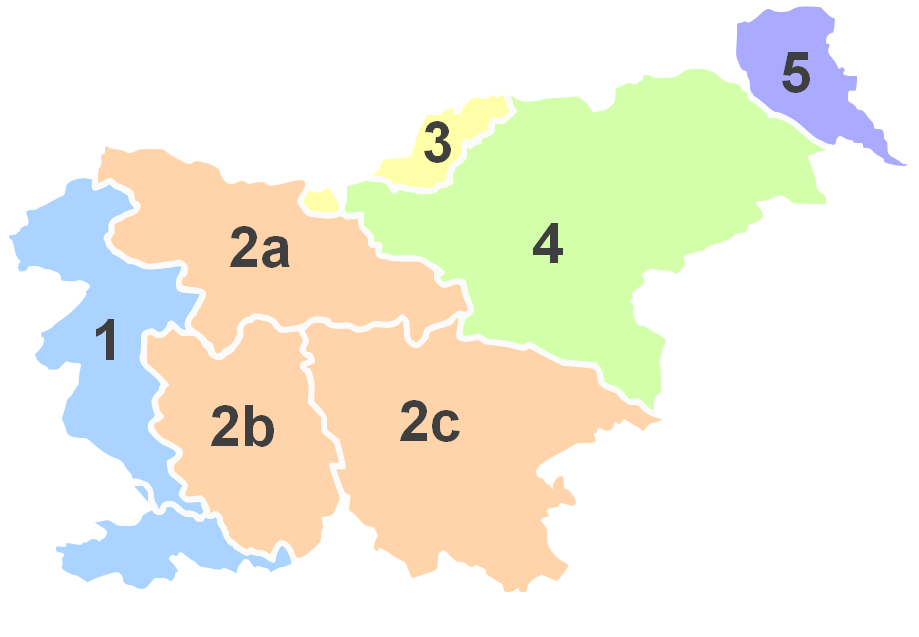
Traditional regions of Slovenia.: 1. Littoral; 2. Carniola: 2a Upper, 2b Inner, 2c Lower; 3. Carinthia; 4. Styria; 5. Prekmurje

Prekmurje (Slovene pronunciation: [pɾɛkˈmúːɾjɛ] also [ˈpɾeːkmuɾjɛ]; Prekmurje Slovene: Prèkmürsko or Prèkmüre; Hungarian: Muravidék) is a geographically, linguistically, culturally, and ethnically defined region of Slovenia, settled by Slovenes and a Hungarian minority, lying between the Mur River in Slovenia and the Rába Valley (the watershed of the Rába; Slovene: Porabje) in the westernmost part of Hungary. It covers an area of 938 square kilometers (362 sq mi) and has a population of 78,000 people. Its largest town and urban center is Murska Sobota, the other urban center being Lendava.

== Name ==
It is named after the Mur River, which separates it from the rest of Slovenia. The name Prekmurje literally means 'area beyond the Mur' (prek 'beyond, on the other side' + Mura 'Mur River' + je, a collective suffix). In Hungarian, the region is known as Muravidék, and in German as Übermurgebiet.

The name Prekmurje was introduced in the twentieth century, although it is derived from an older term. Before 1919, the Slovenian-inhabited lands of Vas County in the Kingdom of Hungary and Austria-Hungary were known as the Slovene March or "Vendic March" (in Slovenian: Slovenska krajina, in Hungarian: Vendvidék). The part of modern Prekmurje that belonged to Zala County (the area between Lendava, Kobilje and Beltinci) was not considered to be a part of the Slovenian March. Until the early 19th century, this region of the Zala County belonged ecclesiastically to the Archdiocese of Zagreb and in the legal documents of the Archdiocese it was called as "Transmurania" or "Prekmurje", that is the "territory on the other side of the Mur River". After 1919, this name was reintroduced, now for administrative purposes, by the new Yugoslav administration. It, however, did not gain much popularity among the locals. The name "Slovenian March" was still used by the local inhabitants until the mid-1920s, but was gradually replaced by the term "March of the Mur" (Slovenian: Murska krajina). The current Hungarian name for Prekmurje, Muravidék, dates from the interwar period and is a translation of the Slovenian Murska krajina. From the mid-1930s onward, the name Prekmurje became widely used in the press and eventually became the most common name for the region. After World War II, this name replaced all previous designations.

Nowadays, the older term Vendvidék still exists in Hungarian, but it is used only for the small settlement area of Hungarian Slovenes between Szentgotthárd and the Slovenian border that remained part of Hungary after 1919.

== Geography ==
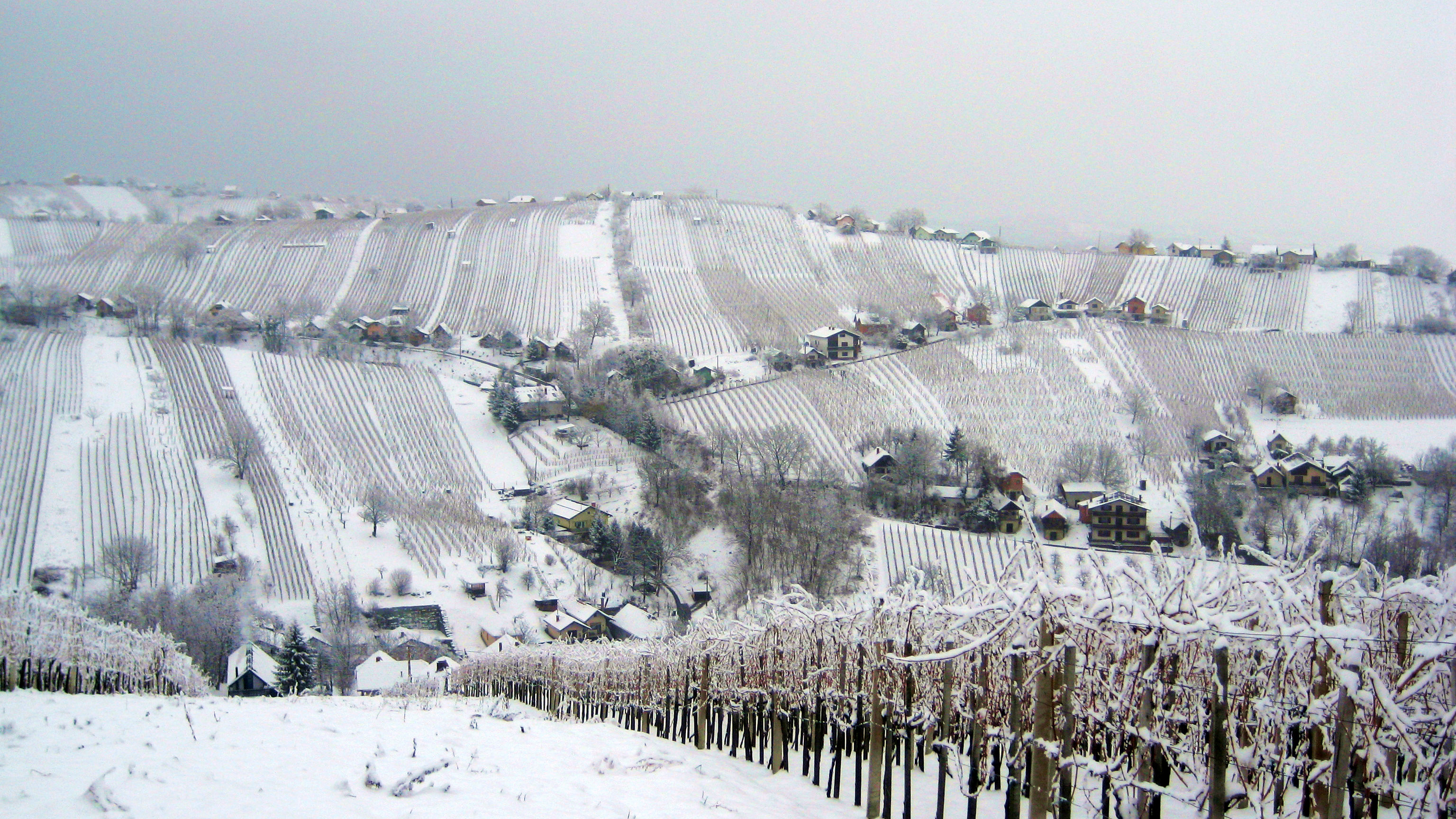
The Lendava Hills in winter

The region is divided into three geographical subregions: the hilly area to the north of Murska Sobota, known as Goričko (literally, 'the uplands'); the eastern flatlands along the Mur River, known as Ravensko (literally, 'the flatlands'), and the western lowlands around Lendava, known as Dolinsko (literally, 'the lowlands'). Northeast of Lendava, there is a small hilly sub-region, known as the Lendava Hills (Lendavske gorice).

The administrative and commercial seat of the region is the town of Murska Sobota. The only other major town is Lendava. Other significant rural centres are Beltinci, Turnišče, Dobrovnik, and Črenšovci.

== Population ==
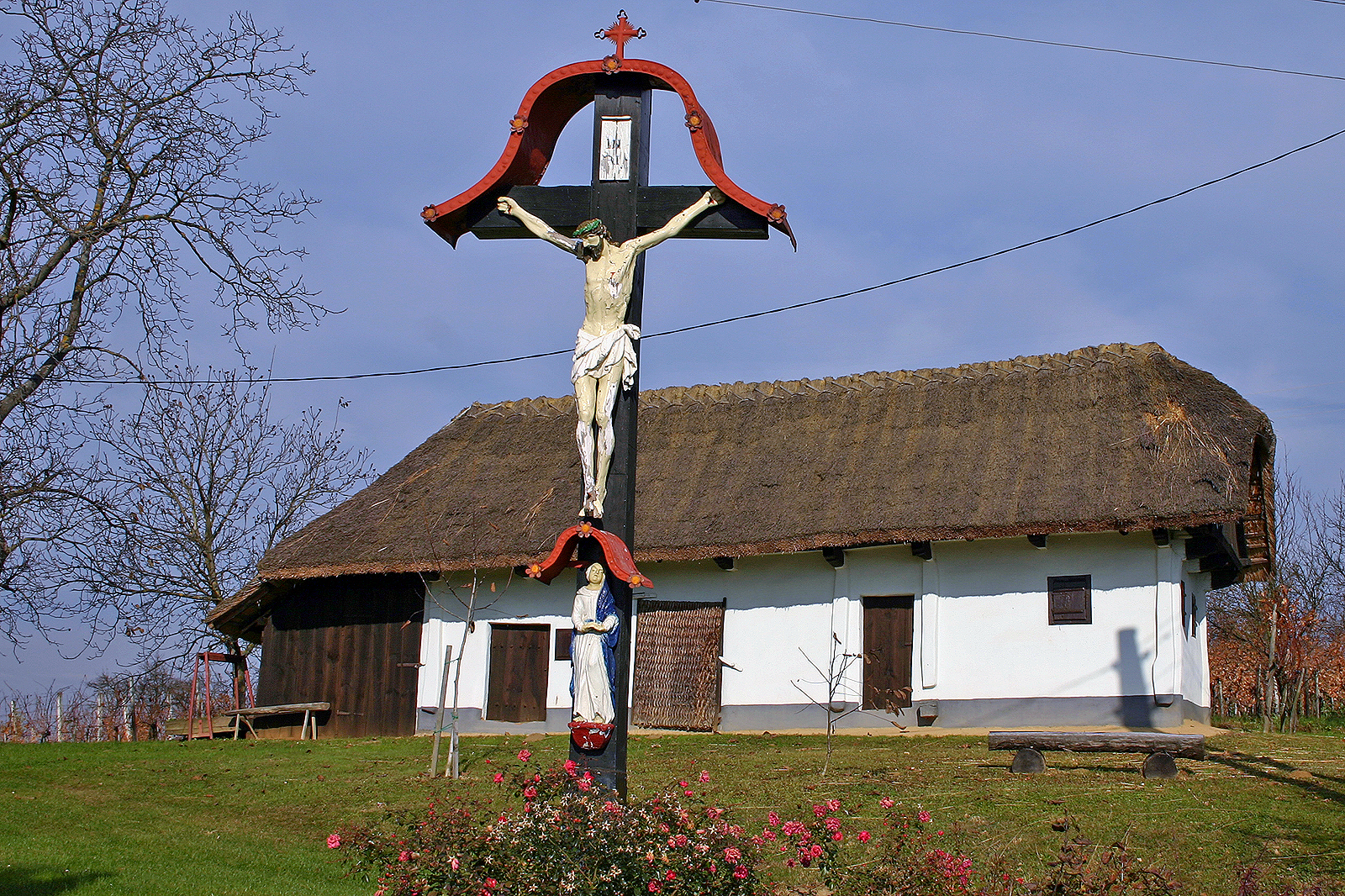
A traditional house in Prekmurje

The majority of the inhabitants of the region are ethnic Slovenes. There are also sizable Hungarian and Romani minorities in the region.

In 1921, the total population of the area numbered 92,295, including 74,199 Slovene speakers, 14,065 Hungarian speakers, and 2,540 German speakers. Since then, the number of Hungarian speakers has been falling slowly but steadily. The German-speaking community, which used to be concentrated in three villages near the Austrian border and in Murska Sobota, was either expelled from the area or assimilated after World War II.

Since the early 1950s, Hungarian has had co-official status in the traditional settlement area of the Hungarian minority. Three municipalities are completely bilingual—Lendava (Hungarian: Lendva), Hodoš (Hungarian: Őrihodos), and Dobrovnik (Hungarian: Dobronak)—and the two municipalities of Šalovci and Moravske Toplice are only partially bilingual. Two municipalities, Hodoš and Dobrovnik, have a Hungarian majority.

Prekmurje has traditionally been the most heterogeneous Slovene region regarding religious affiliation. Besides a Roman Catholic majority, there is a significant Protestant (mostly Lutheran) minority, concentrated in the hills of the Goričko region, which represents 20 to 25% of the population of Prekmurje. Three municipalities have a Lutheran majority (Puconci, Gornji Petrovci, and Hodoš), whereas in the Municipality of Moravske Toplice Lutherans comprise just under half of the population.

Before World War II, there used to be a significant Jewish community as well, mostly concentrated in the towns of Murska Sobota and Lendava (see also Lendava Synagogue). In the 1930s, two-thirds of all Slovenian Jews lived in Prekmurje. Most of them died in the Holocaust, and many of the survivors made aliyah after the war. There is also a significant Romani presence in the region, with Prekmurje being one of the two major settlement areas of Slovenian Romani (the other being Lower Carniola).

== History ==
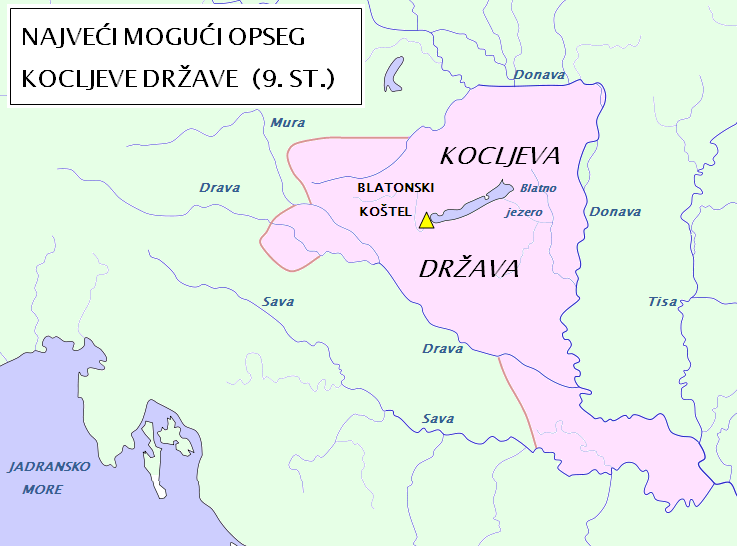
Principality of Lower Pannonia under prince Kocel' (9th century)

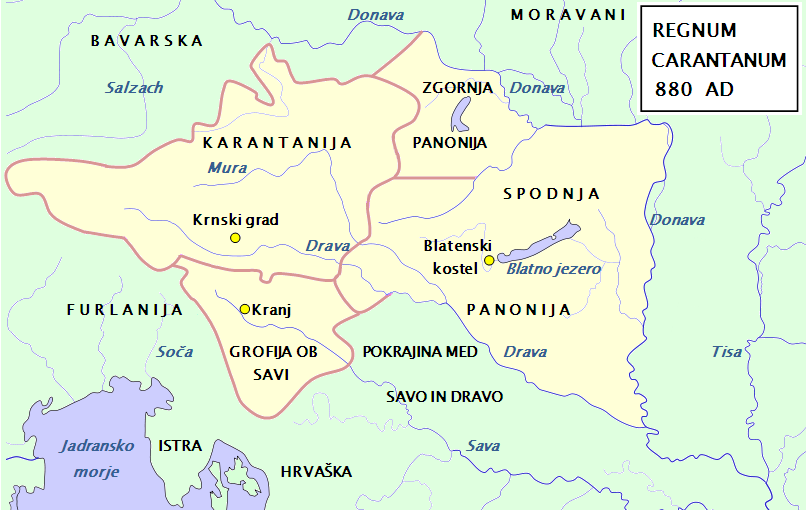
Kingdom of Carantania

=== Overview ===
The region has had a turbulent history: it has been inhabited since the Stone Age, it was later included into the Roman Empire and subsequently into the Odoacer's Kingdom of Italy, the Kingdom of the Ostrogoths, the Kingdom of the Lombards, the Kingdom of the Avars, the Slavic state of Samo, the Frankish Empire, the Principality of Lower Pannonia (9th century), and Arnulf's Kingdom of Carantania (9th-10th century). In the late 10th century it was invaded by the Hungarians and was under administration of the medieval Kingdom of Hungary until the 16th century, when former territories of this kingdom were divided between the Habsburg monarchy and the Ottoman Empire. Since then, Prekmurje was mostly under administration of the Habsburg Monarchy, with brief periods of Ottoman administration. Following the dissolution of the Habsburg monarchy in 1918, the region was firstly included into the Hungarian Democratic Republic and subsequently into the Hungarian Soviet Republic. In 1919, it proclaimed independence as the short-lived Republic of Prekmurje and was subsequently included into the Kingdom of Serbs, Croats and Slovenes (later known as Yugoslavia). From 1941 to 1945, Prekmurje was temporarily occupied by the Axis Powers and in 1945 it was included into the new socialist Yugoslavia. Since 1991, it is part of an independent Slovenia.

=== Antiquity to Middle Ages ===
During the Roman administration, the region was part of the province of Pannonia. Although, earlier Slavic settlements had existed in the area, the ancestors of modern Slovenes moved from eastern Alps and settled in Prekmurje after the Franks defeated the Avars during the reign of Charlemagne. In the 9th century, this area was part of the Slavic state known as the Principality of Lower Pannonia. The center of this state was in the city of Blatnograd near Lake Balaton. The principality was later dissolved and integrated in the Kingdom of Carantania established by the German Emperor Arnulf of Carinthia. This political entity in which all the ancestors of modern Slovenes were united under one ruler was soon destroyed by the Hungarian invaders who conquered the Pannonian plain and who incorporated Prekmurje into the Kingdom of Hungary. The area inhabited by Slovenes shrank to the present extent by the end of the 12th century and has remained stable since. In the 11th century, during Hungarian administration, the region was part of the Kolon county. Between the 11th century and 1526, it was divided between Vas County and Zala County. In the end of the 13th and beginning of the 14th century, during the collapse of the central power in the Kingdom of Hungary, the region was part of the domain of semi-independent oligarch Henrik Kőszegi.

=== Habsburg Royal Kingdom of Hungary ===
Map of the short-lived Republic of Prekmurje (1919)

In 1526, the region of Prekmurje came under Habsburg administration, although some villages were under Ottoman administration during short periods between 1566 and 1688. During Habsburg administration in the 16th and 17th centuries, the region was part of the Captaincy between Lake Balaton and the Drava River within the Habsburg Kingdom of Hungary. For a short time, Beltinci, under the name Balatin, became the sanjak center of the Ottoman Kanije Province. In 1687, Vas and Zala counties were restored: with a small interruption from 1849 to 1867, most of Prekmurje belonged to Vas County except for the Lendava district, which was part of Zala County until 1918.

=== 20th century ===
After the end of World War I and dissolution of Habsburg Monarchy, there was briefly an independent Hungarian state and a short-lived Republic of Prekmurje that emerged in the midst of the chaos of the Hungarian Revolution of 1919. In 1918 the Catholic politicians and József Klekl aimed to create an autonomous entity or independent state, with the name Slovenska krajina. On August 12, 1919, Yugoslav troops took control of the region, and it was incorporated into the newly established Kingdom of Serbs, Croats and Slovenes (renamed Yugoslavia in 1929). Between 1919 and 1922, the region belonged to Maribor county, between 1922 and 1929 to Maribor oblast, and between 1929 and 1941 to the Drava Banovina with Ljubljana as its capital. During World War II, it was occupied and annexed by the Kingdom of Hungary from 1941 to 1944 and by Nazi Germany between 1944 and 1945. Soviet troops took control of the area in May 1945. After the war it became part of the Socialist Republic of Slovenia, which was one of the newly formed republics of Yugoslavia.

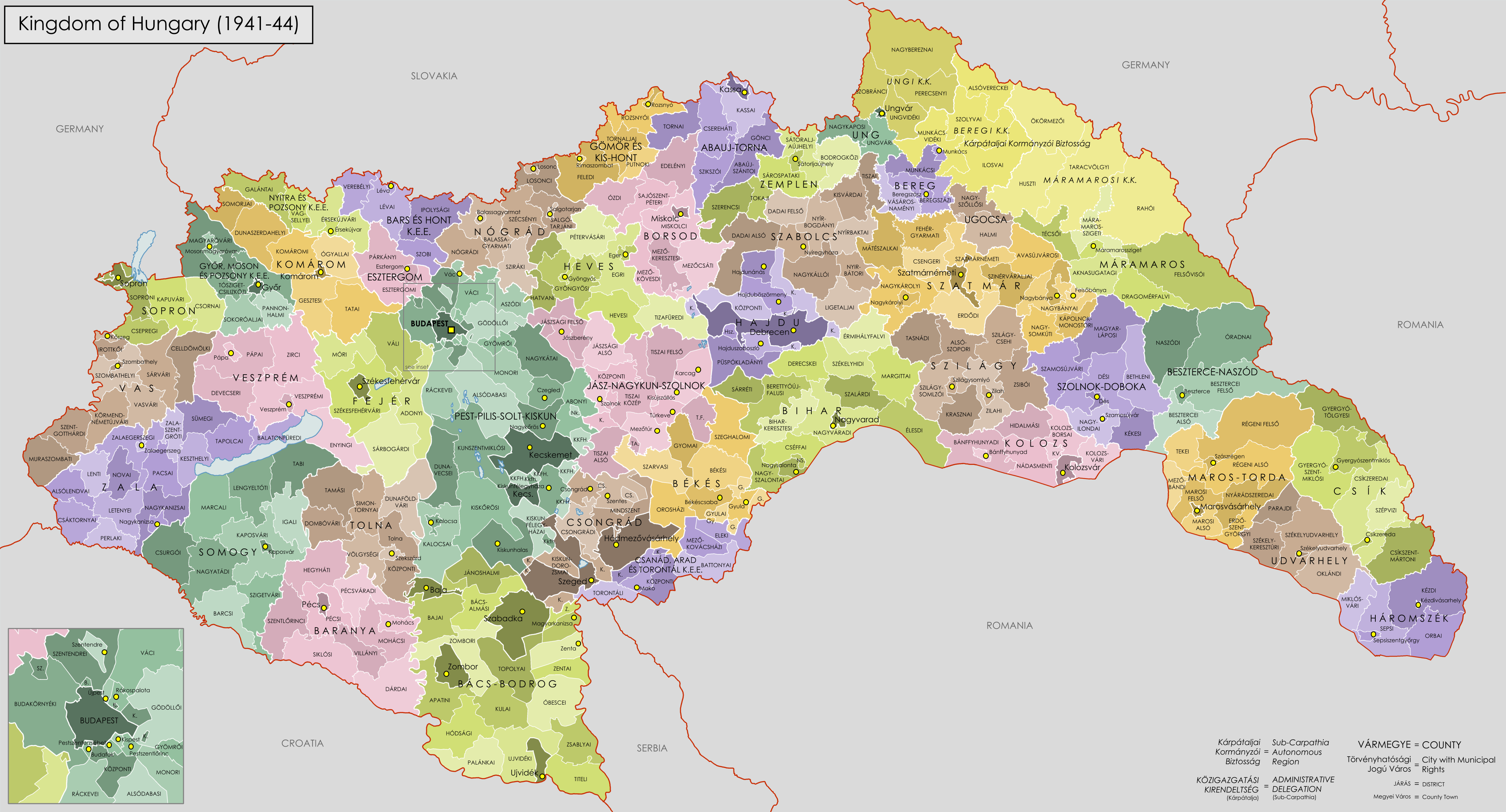
Administrative Map of Hungary between 1941 and 1944

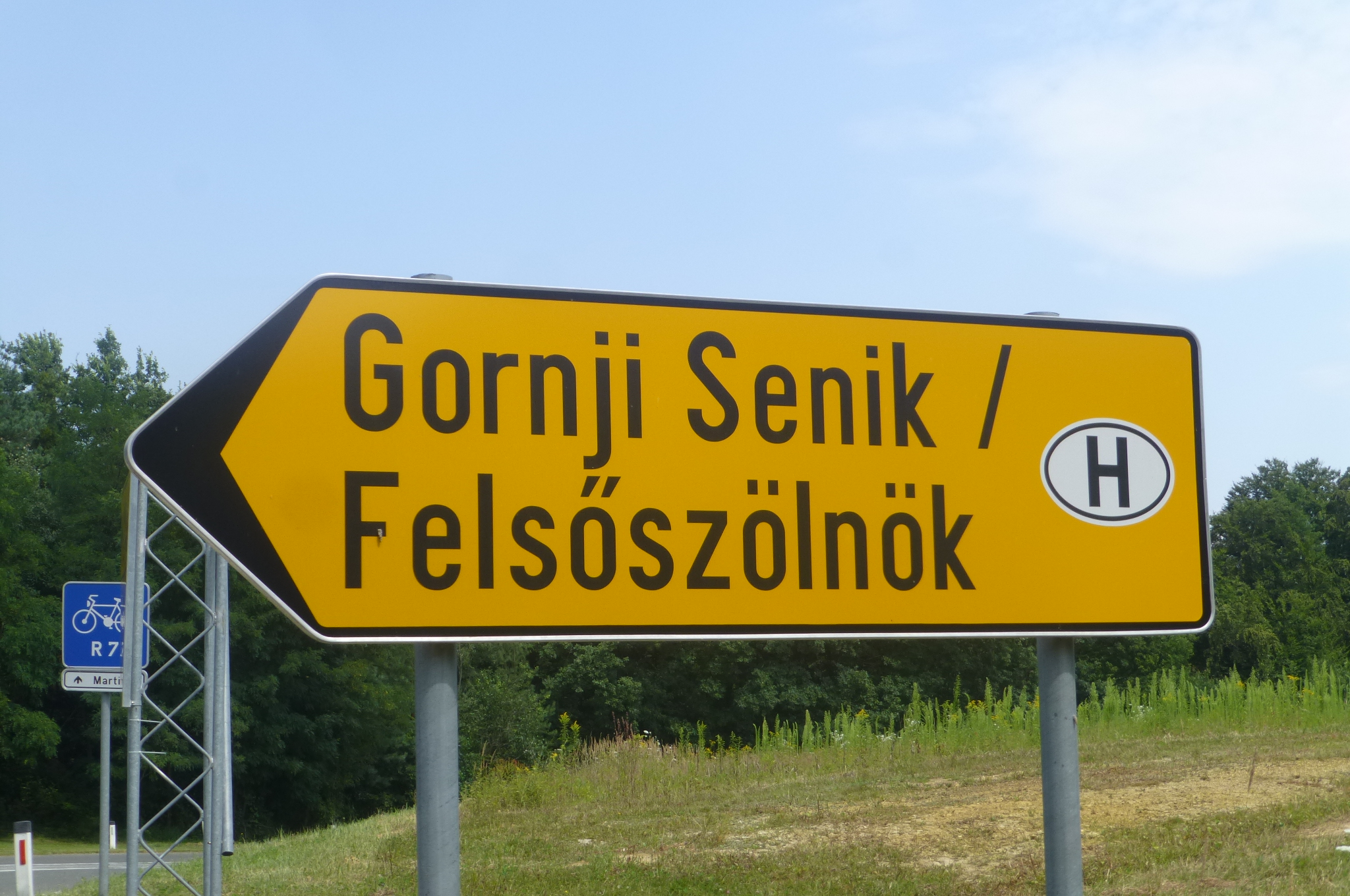
Bilingual (Slovenian and Hungarian) signs in Martinje (Hungarian: Magasfok)

== Administrative divisions ==
Prekmurje is part of the Mura Statistical Region, also known as Pomurje or the Mura Region, which includes two historical regions: Prekmurje and the Prlekija sub-region.

Prekmurje is divided into 19 municipalities:

- Beltinci
- Cankova
- Črenšovci
- Dobrovnik
- Gornji Petrovci
- Grad
- Hodoš
- Kobilje
- Kuzma
- Lendava
- Moravske Toplice
- Murska Sobota
- Odranci
- Puconci
- Rogašovci
- Šalovci
- Tišina
- Turnišče
- Velika Polana

== Languages ==
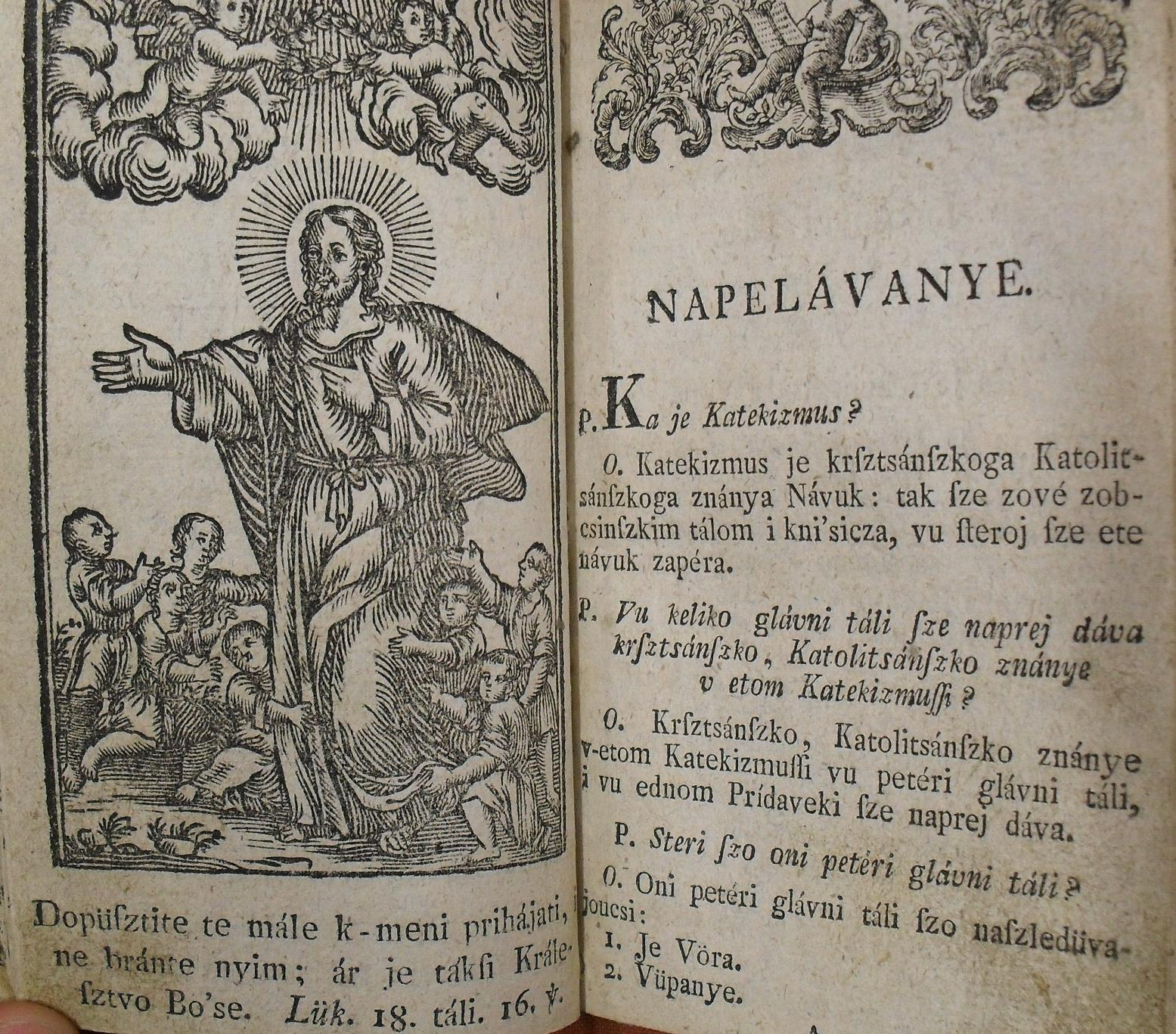
Miklós Küzmics's catechism in Prekmurje Slovene from 1804

The majority of the population of Prekmurje uses Slovene, either in its standard form or in the Prekmurje Slovene. Some of the local population speaks Hungarian or Romani. Before World War II, German was also present in the region, especially in some areas along the border with Austria. According to the Yugoslav census of 1931, just over 2% of the population of the region spoke German as their native language, and around 12% used Hungarian. After 1945, most of the German speakers either fled or were expelled, and the use of Hungarian has been in slow but constant decline since 1918.

Prekmurje Slovene served as the regional language of the Prekmurje region and of the Slovenes in Hungary for a long time. It a codified language form and has a literary corpus of around 500 works and several newspapers and magazines. After World War II, the use of written Prekmurje Slovene steeply declined, but it has never been entirely abandoned. Modern Prekmurje writers, poets, and journalists are continuing the literary tradition of the codified language.

It continued to be used by a broad range of people and, like other Slovene dialects, has retained its own special features that distinguish it from standard Slovene. Most Slovene speakers in the region, like elsewhere in Slovenia, thus live in a situation of diglossia. Although minority languages and the local dialect are still widely used in most spheres of private life, especially in rural areas, standard Slovene is used in education, media, and public life. In the 2020s, demands include recognition of Prekmurje Slovene in education, the media, literature, and politics.

Hungarian is used in some border areas, especially around Lendava. In the officially bilingual areas, Hungarian is recognized by the Slovenian government and is used as the second official language alongside Slovene. In these areas, all public signs are written in both languages, and primary and secondary education is bilingual.

Some of the Roma population in the region have retained Romani. Slovenia recognizes Romani as a minority language, but this official recognition has very few consequences in practice. The legal protection of Romani is much weaker than that for Hungarian.

== Cuisine ==
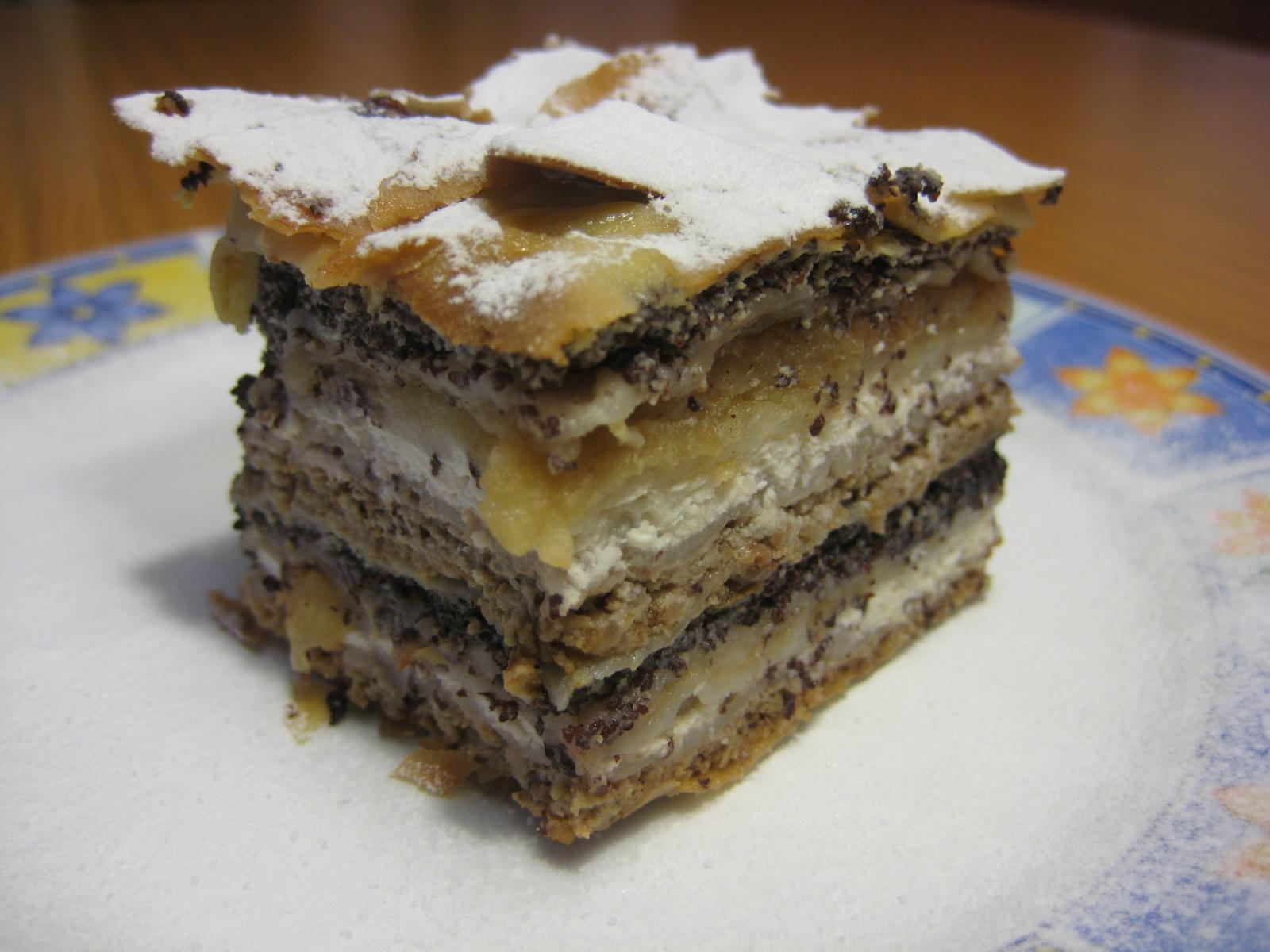
Prekmurska gibanica is a typical pastry of the Prekmurje region.

The region is known for its distinctive cuisine. Among traditional dishes, the best known are a pork, turnip, and millet casserole called bujta repa and a layered pastry called prekmurska gibanica.

== Notable people ==
- Mihael Bakoš, Lutheran preacher and author
- Gregor Balažic, football player
- Evald Flisar, writer
- László Göncz, historian and politician
- Feri Horvat, politician, Chairman of the Slovenian National Assembly (2004)
- Miško Kranjec, writer
- Vlado Kreslin, singer
- Milan Kučan, politician, President of Slovenia (1990–2002)
- Števan Küzmič, Lutheran preacher and author
- Mikloš Küzmič, writer and translator
- Feri Lainšček, writer
- Oto Luthar, historian
- Miki Muster, cartoonist
- Mitja Mörec, football player
- Ana Osterman, politician
- Avgust Pavel, ethnologist and translator
- Mária Pozsonec, politician
- Dušan Šarotar, writer
- Radovan Žerjav, politician, chairman of the Slovenian People's Party and Minister of Economy of Slovenia
- Nika Zorjan, singer

== See also ==
- Prekmurje Slovene
- Prekmurje Slovenes
- Slovene March (Kingdom of Hungary)
- Republic of Prekmurje
- Wendish question
- Međimurje

== Bibliography ==
- Hajdinjak, Maja (2020). Opis sodobne prekmurščine. Magistrsko delo. Ljubljana: Filozofska fakulteta Univerze v Ljubljani. Oddelek za slovenistiko.
- Jesenšek, Marko (2010). Prekmuriana. Fejezetek a szlovén nyelv történetéből. Cathedra Philologiae Slavicae. Budapest: Balassi Kiadó. ISBN 978-963-506-846-3.
- Just, Franci (2006). Panonski književni portreti 1. Prekmurje in Porabje A-I. Murska Sobota: Franc-Franc. ISBN 961-219-093-3.
