= Goričko Natural Park =

Nature park in northeastern Slovenia

- IUCN category V (protected landscape/seascape)
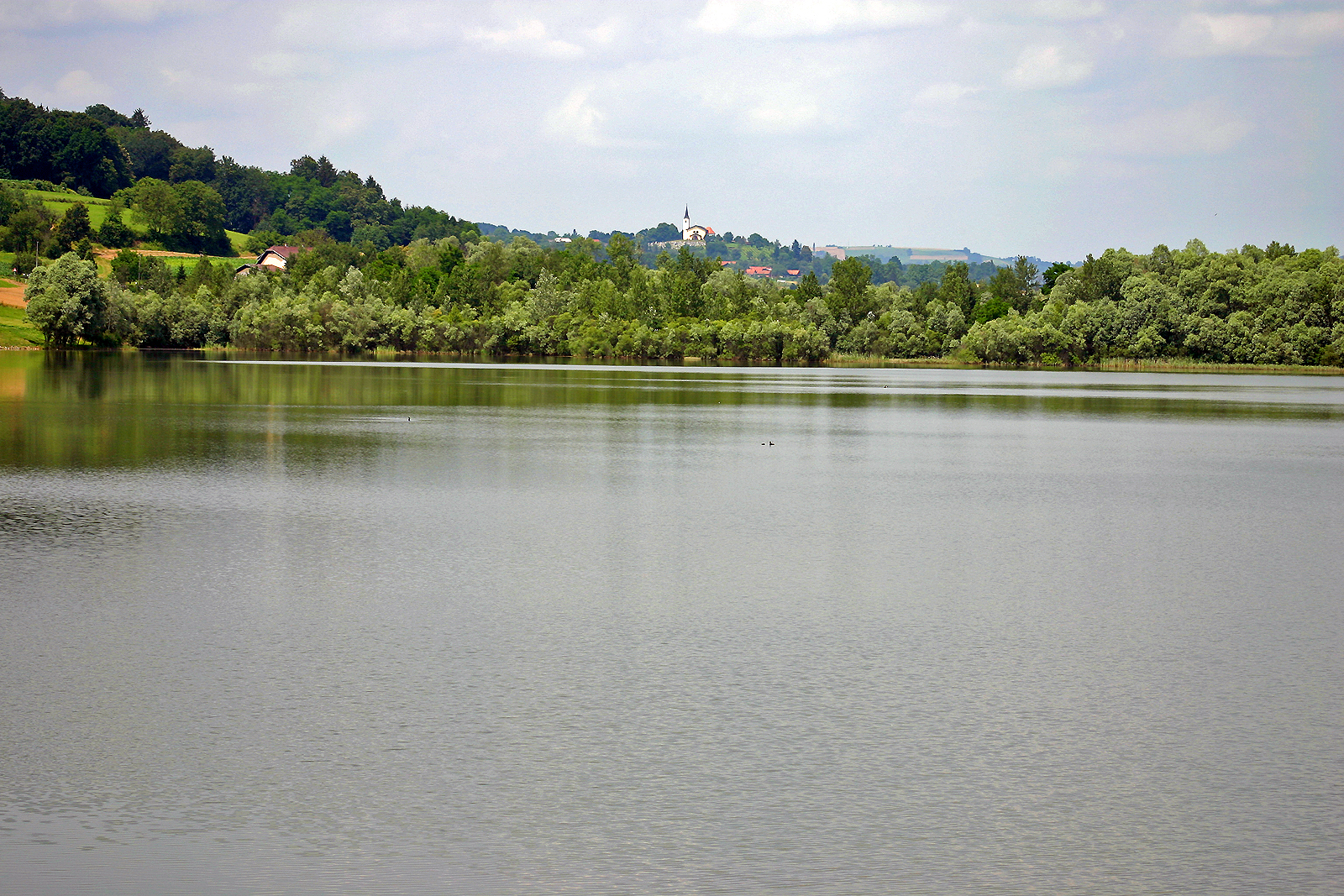
- Lake Krašči (Lake Ledava) in the background

- Location within Slovenia
- Coordinates: 46.799913°N 16.097202°E
- Area: 462 km^{2} (178 sq mi)
- Established: 2003

The Goričko Natural Park (Slovene: Krajinski park Goričko) was established on 9 October 2003 and is an integral part of the trilateral Goričko–Örseg–Raab Natural Park. It covers an area of 46,200 hectares (114,000 acres), which means that it is the second largest nature park in Slovenia.

This is the most central European region in Slovenia, where Dinaric, Mediterranean, and Alpine influences are almost not felt. The hills that the Goričko region was named after were created by the Pannonian Sea. The terrain rises slightly to the north. It is a hillocky landscape overgrown by trees. There are many marshes and wet meadows, although it is the most arid Slovenia region, with an annual rainfall of only approximately 800 litres per square metre (16 imp gal/sq ft).

== Flora and fauna ==
Goričko still preserves many natural conditions. Evidence of this is the best preserved population of otters (Lutra lutra) in Slovenia. With extensive water networks as well as standing bodies of water, such as lakes, ponds, and marshes, favorable living conditions for the species are increasing.

The best-preserved natural ecosystems are the oak forests, the habitat of several rare species, including the oak beetle (Cerambyx cerdo) and the stag beetle (Lucanus cervus). The local red deer (Cervus elaphus) is the only native population of deer in Slovenia that avoided extermination in the 19th century. The forests are also home to the hazel dormouse (Muscardinus avellanarius). This is a rare relative of the edible dormouse.

== See also ==
- Protected areas of Slovenia
