= Ferenc Merkli =

Ferenc Merkli (born November 29, 1974) is a Hungarian Slovene Catholic priest, writer, and translator.

He was born in Szentgotthárd to Ferenc and Irén Merkli, and grew up in Szakonyfalu. He attended the Pontifical Gregorian University in Rome. After his ordination, he served the Deanery of Szentgotthárd in the parish of Felsőszölnök and Apátistvánfalva, and was known for celebrating bilingual masses in Hungarian and Prekmurje Slovene.

In 2011, Merkli translated the work of Lojzer Kozar into Hungarian, and compiled a hymnal with content in the Prekmurje dialect and standard Slovene for the Hungarian Slovenes with Lojzer Kozar Jr. (Cirill Kozar).

Merkli lives in Vasszécseny.

== See also ==
- Church of St. Stephen Harding in Apátistvánfalva
- List of Slovene writers and poets in Hungary

== Sources ==
- Lojze Kozar: Elmozdítható gyertyatartó, Martinus Kiadó Szombathely 2011. ISBN 978-615-5091-11-7
- Poslušajte vsi ljudje, Gornji Senik 2011. ASIN B006P8FSZS
