= St. Stephen Harding Church in Apátistvánfalva =

Church in Apatistvanfalva, Hungary

Coordinates: 46.8971°N 16.2566°E

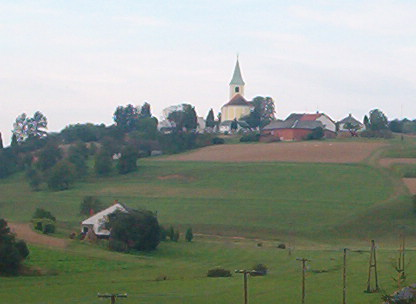
St. Stephen Harding Church in Apátistvánfalva

St. Stephen Harding Church in Apátistvánfalva or Apátistvánfalvian Church (Hungarian: Apátistvánfalvai Harding Szent István templom, Slovene: Cerkev Svetega Štefana v Števanovci Prekmurje Slovene: Števanovska cerkev Svétoga Števana Hardinga) is a Baroque Roman Catholic Church in the village of Apátistvánfalva (Števanovci), Hungary. It is near the Hungarian-Slovenian border, in the Vendvidék region. Its patron saint, Stephen Harding was an English saint and the founder of the Cistercian Order.

Because this area is traditionally ethnically Slovenian, mass was offered only in Prekmurje Slovenian. Today, mass is celebrated in Hungarian and the local Prekmurje Slovenian dialect.

== History of the church ==
The church was built in 1785. The bishop of Vas, János Szily, aided in the construction and also supported building a school in the village. The first priest was János Marits. The new parish included Permise (now Kétvölgy), Börgölin/Újbalázsfalva (now Apátistvánfalva), Orfalu, Rábatótfalu (now part of Szentgotthárd), Szakonyfalu, and sometimes Markovci, now in Slovenia.

By the 12th century, Apátistvánfalva was a Cistercian lordship. In 1183, Béla III of Hungary founded a Cistercian abbey in Szentgotthárd. The monks arrived from the Trois-Fontaines Abbey, Champagne, France.

For many years, the Hungarian Slovenes had attended church in Rábakethely (near Szentgotthárd), Felsőszölnök, or Great Dolenci (Slovenia). In Alsószölnök where German, Slovenian, and Hungarian people lived, the believers went to Sankt Martin an der Raab in Austria (a church was also built in Alsószölnök in 1816).

Bishop Szily supported masses being offered in the local language (Croatian, Prekmurje Slovene, or German), and therefore appointed Marits.

In 2005, Jožef Smej, the bishop of Maribor, along with several Hungarian and Slovenian priests blessed a memorial tablet in the church listing the names of Apátistvánfalvian priests and chaplains.

== Building ==
The church's walls are 2 metres (6.6 ft) thick, and it can hold 2,000 people.

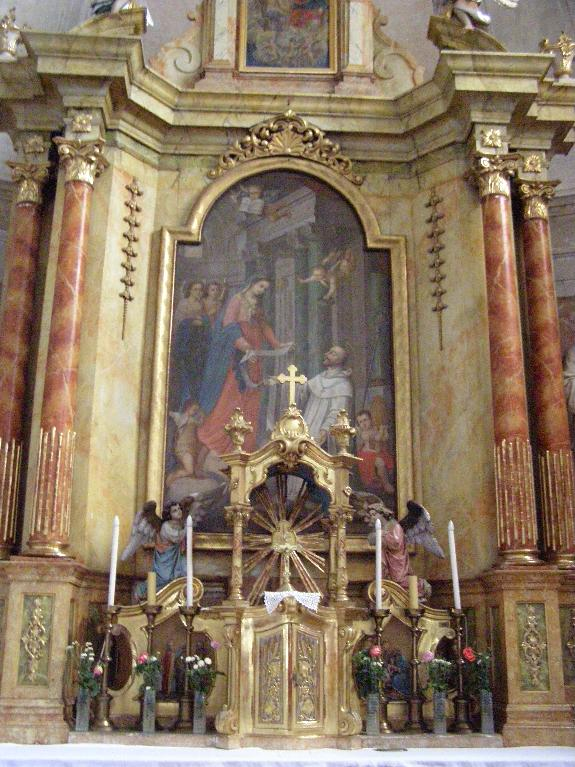
The High Altar (Legend of Stephen Harding-Mural).

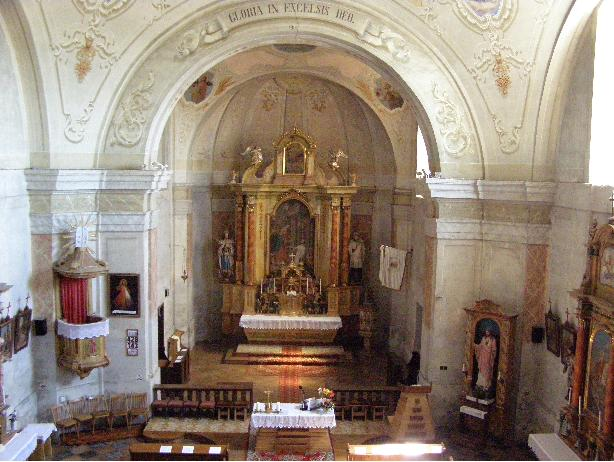
In the choir

The Baroque murals were created by an unknown painter. The High Altar shows the Legend of St. Stephen Harding. The Trinity is depicted above the mural.

There is an organ in the choir. It was made in 1894 and restored in 2007. Before the restoration, a small organ was used. The steeple has two bells. Near the church are a school, cemetery, a parish office, a war memorial, and the statue of the Virgin Mary.

== Gallery ==
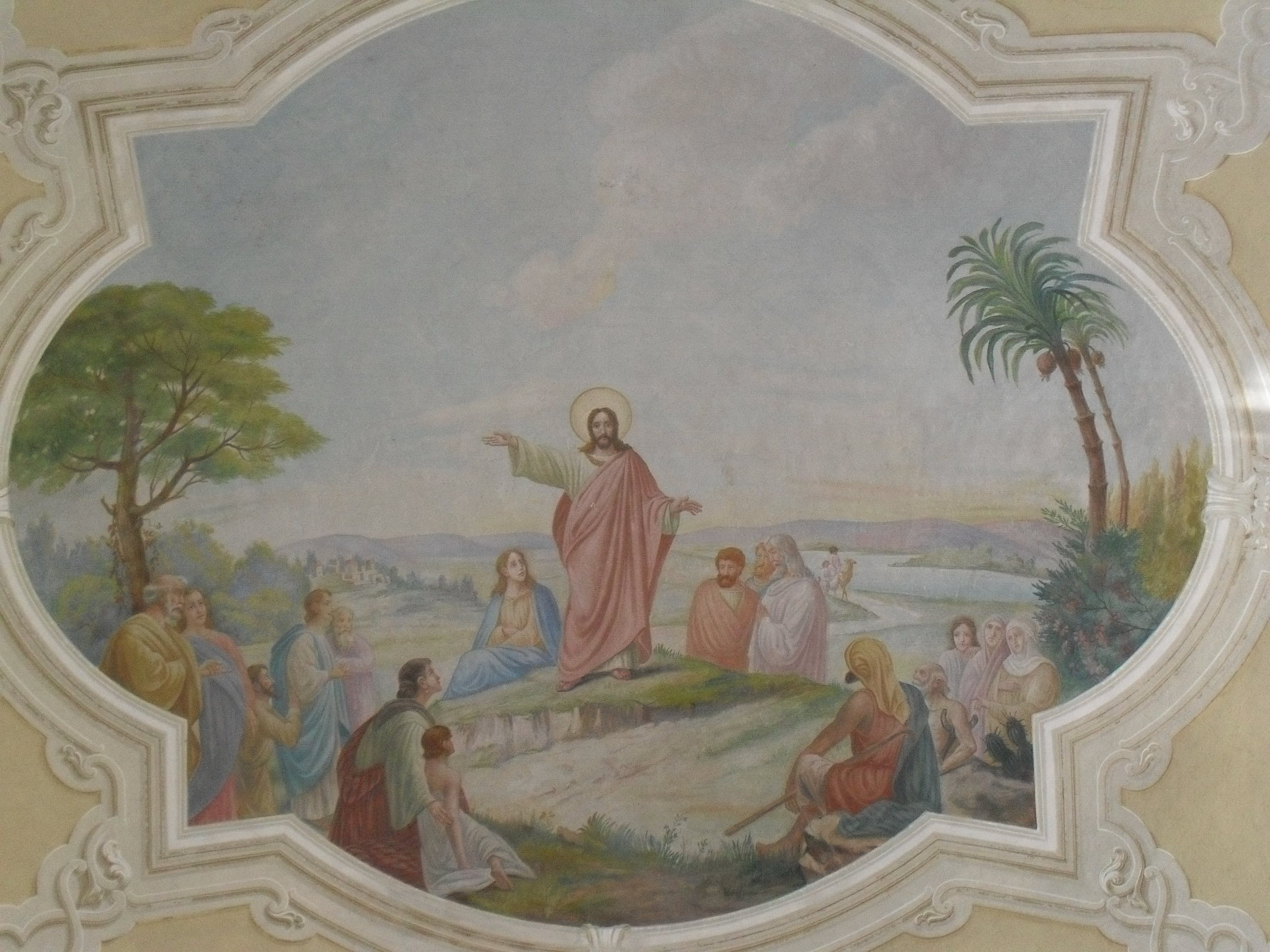
Sermon on the Mount

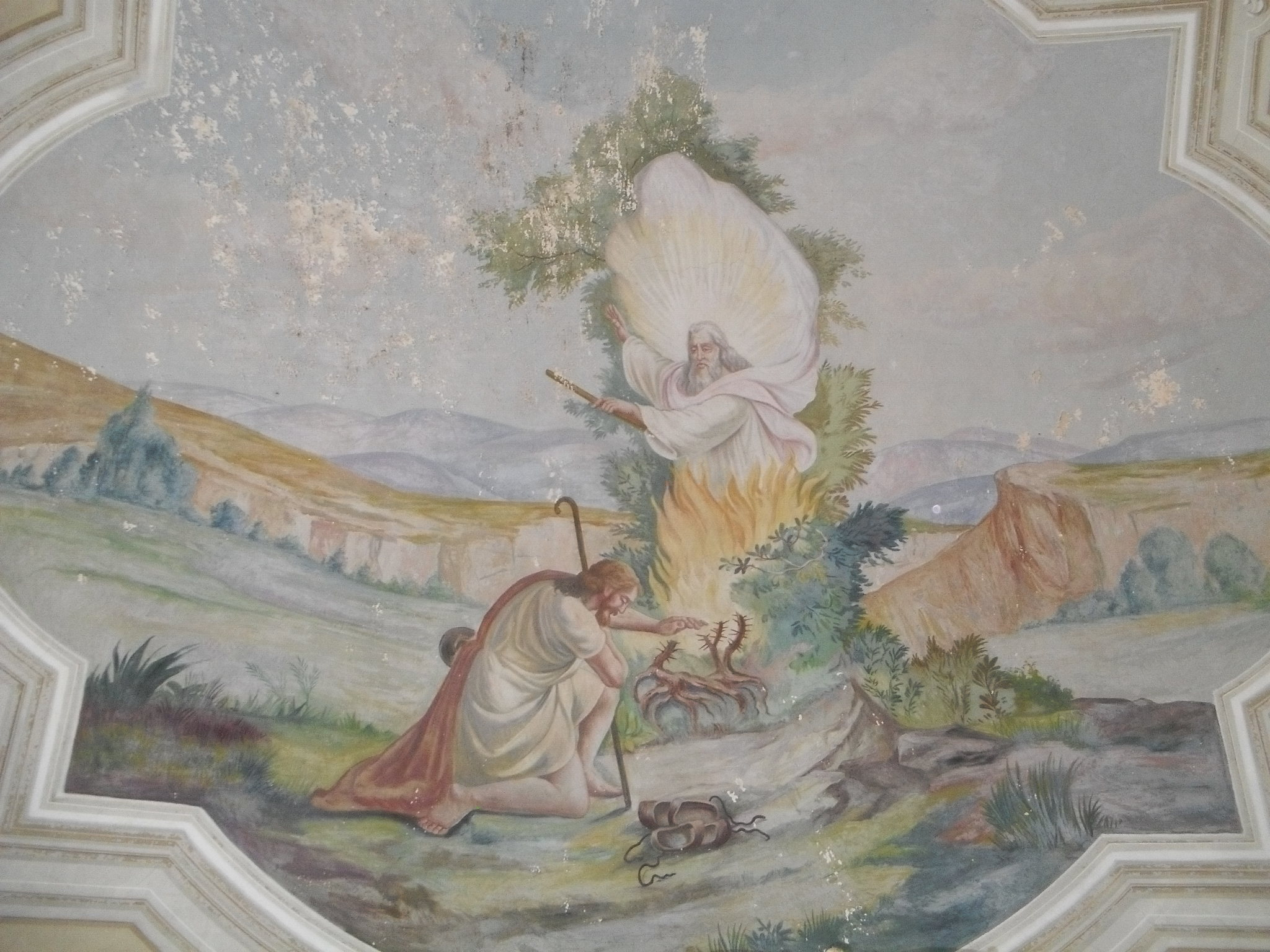
Moses and the Burning Bush

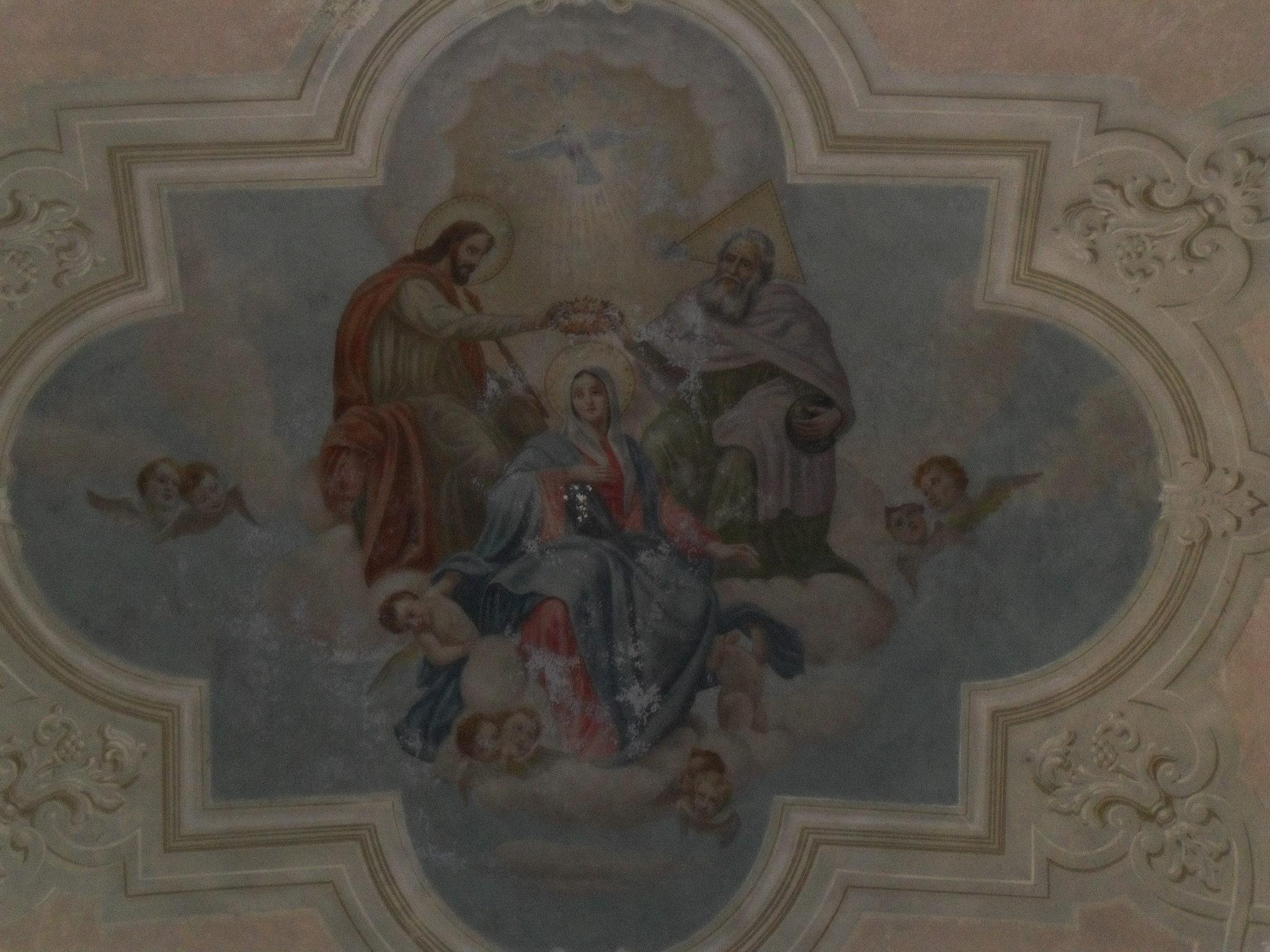
The Trinity
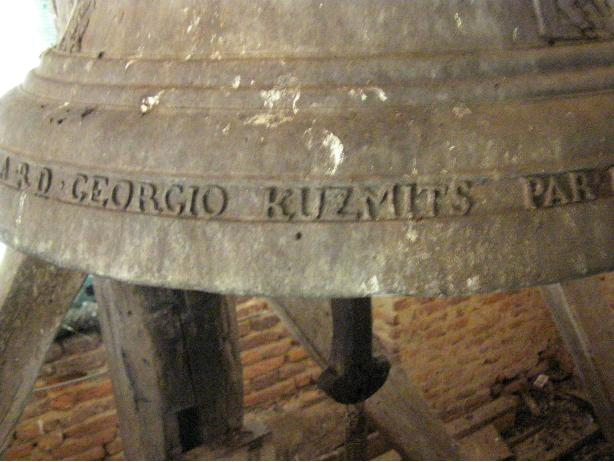
The name of Priest György Küzmics (1752-1810) of the Old Small Bell

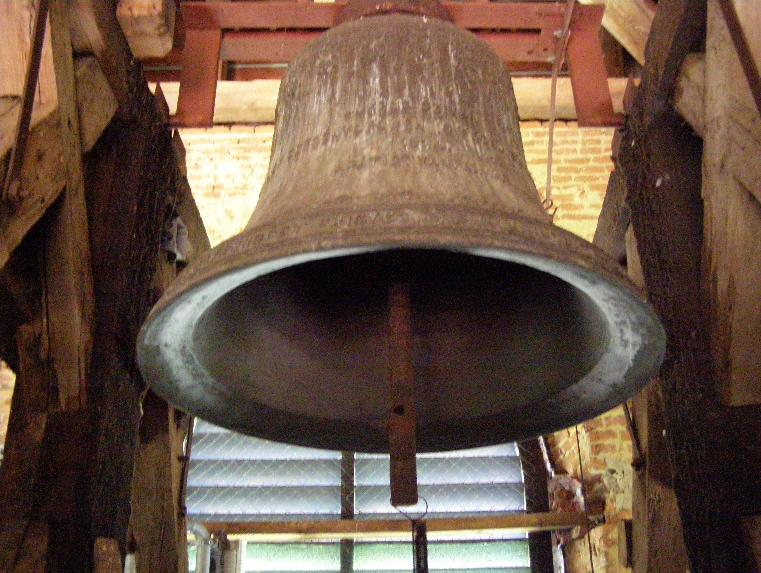
The Great Bell

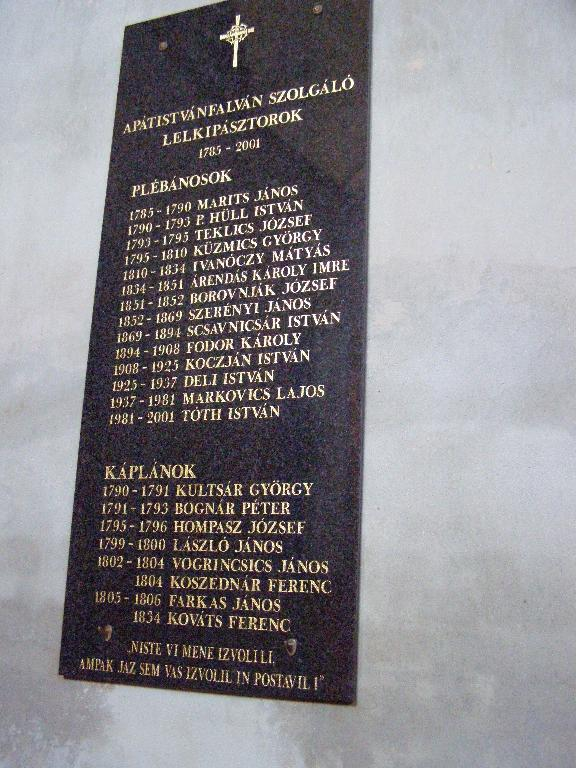
The memorial tablet of the istvánfalvian Priests and Chaplains

== Priests of Apátistvánfalva ==
=== János Marits ===
János Marits was of Slovenian descent (Slovene: Janoš Maritš) and was born in Sveti Jurij, Rogašovci (Slovenia) in around 1757 or 1767. He learned theology in Győr. His consecration was September 20, 1783. He was a clerk in Dolenci. He then was a chaplain in Rábakethely. Marits built the Apátistvánfalvian school and hired the teacher György Marits (born in Gerečavci in 1766 and died in 1810). Marits was the first priest in Apátistvánfalva. In the future, he worked in Felsőszölnök. János Marits died April 24, 1800. He spoke Slovene and German.

=== István Hüll P. ===
István Hüll P. was born Dolnji Slaveči.

=== József Teklics ===
József Teklics was of Croatian descent and was born in Szentpéterfa on April 26, 1770. His parents, Sándor Teklits and Katalin, were petty noblemen. His consecration was on September 14, 1793. He was chaplain, then priest in Apátistvánfalva (1793–1795), Turnišče (1795–1796), chaplain and clerk in Oberwart (1796–1797), chaplain in Szepetnek (1797–1801), and finally, priest in Szőce. After 1805 he was a chaplain in Nagygencs (now Gencsapáti) and Gaas. In 1806, he lived in Győr. He died sometime after 1824.

=== György Küzmics ===
György Küzmics was of Slovenian descent (Slovene: Jurij Küzmič) and was born in Dolnji Slaveči on December 14, 1752. He learned theology in Győr and Buda. He was consecrated in Grad, Slovenia on September 13, 1779. He was then a chaplain in Rábakethely (1779–1781), a priest in Gornji Petrovci (1781–1785), and finally in Dolenci (1785–1795). He worked in Apátistvánfalva by September 26, 1795, until February 27, 1810. Küzmics was dean of Őrség. He spoke Slovenian and German.

=== Mátyás Ivanóczy ===
Mátyás Ivanóczy was a Slovenian petty nobleman, not Hungarian. The old name of Ivanóczys is Kodila or Kobila. The Ivanóczy name alluded to the family provenance Ivanóc (Ivanovci). He was born in Ivanovci on February 2, 1781. His parents were Mihály Kodila and Katalin. His consecration was in 1804. He was a chaplain in Turnišče (1804–1808), Beltinci (1808–1810), and a priest in Apátistvánfalva by May 8, 1810. He died on April 18, 1834. He spoke Slovene and German.

=== Imre Károly Árendás ===
Imre Károly Árendás was the first Hungarian priest in Apátistvánfalva. He was born in Tardos on October 22, 1798. His parents were János Árendás and Katalin Gálitz. In Vienna he learned theology, then spent three years in Szombathely. His consecration was on October 28, 1821. He was an educator by 1821, and spent 1822 in Nagycsákány (now Csákánydoroszló) in the Batthyány-castle. He was a chaplain in Rábakethely (1822–1823), Vasszentmihály (1823–1824), Nyőgér (1824–1825.), Szepetnek (1825–1828), clerk in Kőszegszerdahely (1828), priest in Alsószölnök (1829–1834), then Apátistvánfalva (1834–1851). In 1851he was a superannuate. He died in Pásztorháza on December 30, 1857. He spoke Croatian, Slovene, and German.

=== János Szerényi ===
János Szerényi's real name was János Czvörnyek. He was of Slovenian descent. He was born in Grad, Slovenia, on March 9, 1815. His parents were György Czvörnyek and Éva Szlámár villeins. He was consecrated on July 20, 1842. He was a chaplain in Murska Sobota (1842–1844), Črenšovci (1844–1845), Križevci (1845–1847), Bogojina (1847), Sveti Jurij, Rogašovci (1848–1852), Beltinci (1848–1852). He was a priest in Apátistvánfalva by February 1852. He died on March 31, 1869. He spoke German and Slovene.

=== József Ivanóczy ===
József Ivanóczy was born in Ivanovci on March 17, 1842. His parents were Miklós Kódela and Rozália Borovnyák. His consecration was on March 9, 1868. He was a chaplain in Beltinci (1868), Felsőszölnök (1868–1869), priest in Apátistvánfalva (1869), sometimes again chaplain in Črenšovci (1869–1870), Tišina (1870–1872), Lendvavásárhely (now Dobrovnik) (1872–1873), Felsőszölnök (1873–1878), priest in Sveti Sebeščan (1878–1896). He was in Križevci by 1897 until 1901 as a clerk. In 1901 was chaplain in Črenšovci. Died in Radkersburg June 21, 1903. He spoke Slovene and German language.

=== István Scsavnicsár ===
István Scsavnicsár was born in Rakičan, near Murska Sobota on August 10, 1828. His parents were István Scsavnicsár and Katalin Szecsko. His consecration was on March 8, 1855. He was a chaplain in Grad, Slovenia (1855–1856), a clerk in Gornji Petrovci (1856–1869), and priest in Apátistvánfalva by 1869. He died on January 15, 1894. He spoke Slovene and German.

=== Károly Fodor ===
Károly Fodor was born in Krajišnik, in Vojvodina, and was of Hungarian-Serbian descent. He was born on November 11, 1839. His parents were Sándor Fodor and Fáni Vresits. In the VII. and VIII. class, he was a small seminarist. He was consecrated on July 20, 1863. He was a chaplain in Felsőszölnök (1863-1865.), Tišina (1865–1868), Beltinci (1868–1869), and priest in Apátistvánfalva (1869), and at Gornji Petrovci (1869- 1894). By August 1, 1894, a new pastor in Apátistvánfalva. He died on July 24, 1908. He spoke Slovene.

=== István Kóczján ===
István Kóczján was a Slovenian priest. He was born in Sodešinci on October 29, 1866. His parents were József Kóczján and Ilona Pertóczi. He was consecrated on July 16, 1891, and was chaplain in Grad, Slovenia (1891), after clerk (1892), a clerk in Tömörd (1892-1893), chaplain in Murska Sobota (1893–1894), a clerk in Apátistvánfalva (1894), priest in Gornji Petrovci (1894–1908), and was a priest in Apátistvánfalva by October 1, 1908. He died on January 3, 1925. His tomb is in the cemetery. He spoke Slovene.

=== István Tóth ===
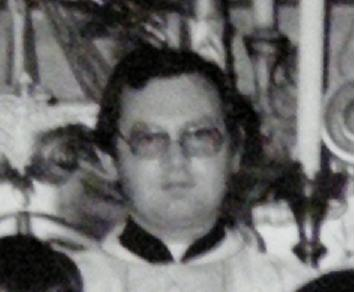
István Tóth

István Tóth was born in 1955 in Felsőszölnök. Between 1970 and 1974, he attended the Secondary School of the St. Benedict Order at Pannonhalma. He pursued his studies for the priesthood at the Theology College of the Bishoprics of Győr. He died in 2001.

=== Ferenc Merkli ===
Ferenc Merkli was born in Szakonyfalu.

== Chaplains ==
=== György Kultsár ===
György Kultsár was a Hungarian priest. He was born in Nemesvis in Sopron country around 1766. He learned in the Seminary in Bratislava. His consecration was on August 24, 1790. He was a chaplain in Apátistvánfalva (1790–1791), Szentgyörgyvölgy (1791–1792), Páka (1792–1793), a clerk in Egyházashetye (1793, --1797), a priest in Rábakovácsi (1797–1825). In 1825, he was a superannuate. He died in Szombathely on October 27, 1830.

=== Péter Bognár ===
Péter Bognár was born in Slovakia, in Michal na Ostrove on June 22, 1768. His father was Ferenc Bognár, and his mother Katalin Katona were both petty noblemen. He learned theology in Bratislava (1787–1790) and Szombathely (1790–1791). His consecration was on August 28, 1791. He was a chaplain in Apátistvánfalva (1791–1793), Vámoscsalád (1793–1799), priest in Egyházashetye by 1799 November, until 1804 September. After that, he was also a pastor. He died on December 5, 1814. He spoke German.

=== Imre Ballia ===
Imre Ballia was of Hungarian descent. He was born in Nemesbőd on January 15, 1768. His parents were petty noblemen, János Ballia and Katalin Dallos. In Bratislava Szombathely learned theology. He was consecrated on August 26, 1792. He was a chaplain in Apátistvánfalva (1792–1793), Ivánc (1793), Nagysitke (new Sitke), then pastor from 1794 until 1797. He was then a chaplain in Szombathely (1797), a priest in Szentkirály (1797–1813), then in Ják by 1813. He died on April 8, 1828. He spoke German.

=== József Hompasz ===
József Hompasz was born in Csém, March 3, 1771. His parents wereJános Humpász and Anna, both petty noblemen. He was consecrated on August 24, 1794. He was a chaplain in Lendava (1794), Apátistvánfalva (1795–1796), Sárvár (1796), Szepetnek (1796–1797), Oberwart (1797–1798), Vámoscsalád (1798–1800), Szentpéterfa (1800–1802), clerk in Nagykölked (1802–1803), a priest in Kukmér (1803–1806), chaplain in Rechnitz (1806–1813), pastor in Weiden bei Rechnitz (1813–1816). He died June 13, 1837. He spoke Croatian and German language.

=== János László ===
János László was a Hungarian priest, born in Megyehíd (near Sárvár) on December 13, 1769. His parents were Pál László (civil servant) and Erzsébet Kiss. He learned theology in Bratislava and Szombathely. His consecration was on September 14, 1793. He was a chaplain in Acsád for 2 and one-half months, Kám (1794–1796), Zalaegerszeg (1796–1798), Hosszúpereszteg (1798–1799), Apátistvánfalva (1799–1800), Páka (1801–1806). Priest in Egyházashollós by December 1, 1806. He died on January 28, 1817. He spoke German.

=== János Vogrincsics ===
János Vogrincsics was of Slovenian descent Slovene: Janoš Vogrinčič) and was the first Slovenian chaplain in Apátistvánfalva. He was born in Pertoča around 1778. He learned philosophy at a small seminary. His consecration was on December 18, 1802. He was a chaplain in Apátistvánfalva, Beltinci, Murska Sobota (1802–1804), a priest in Kančovci after Miklós Küzmics (1804–1805) and died in his place of birth (Pertoča) on February 7, 1806. He spoke Slovene.

=== Ferenc Koszednár ===
Ferenc Koszednár was of Slovenian descent (Slovene: Fran Kosednar). He was born around 1774 in Pertoča. He was a small seminarist. He was consecrated in 1804. chaplain in Apátistvánfalva for 7 months, a clerk in Őriszentpéter for two weeks, a chaplain in Vasszentmihály (1805), Murska Sobota (1805–1807), clerk in Dolenci (1807-1808) and Felsőszölnök (1808). He was a priest in Kančovci by November 1808. He died on October 25, 1810. He spoke Slovene and some German.

=== János Farkas ===
János Farkas was of Hungarian descent. He was born in Szany on May 14, 1780. His consecration was in 1804. He was a chaplain in Letenye (1804–1805), Apátistvánfalva (1805–1806), Salamonvár (1806–1810), Rábahídvég (1810). He was a priest in Boncódfölde by 1811. He died on December 30, 1825. He spoke German.

=== Ferenc Kováts ===
Ferenc Kováts was born in Strehovci on August 16, 1805. His father was János Kovács. His consecration was on September 14, 1831. He was a chaplain in Črenšovci (1831–1833), Dolenci (1833–1834), Apátistvánfalva (1834), and a priest in Dolenci by 1835 until November 5, 1857, when he died. He spoke Slovene.

=== Mátyás Slezák ===
Mátyás Slezák was born in Schachendorf, in Burgenland, in 1821. Slezák is of Croatian descent (Croatian: Matija Šlezak). By 1842, he worked in Apátistvánfalva as a teacher. The house where he lives today stands near the school. According to the notes, he was an honest and gentle man. He was the first cantor in the village. He died on March 1, 1890. His son Henrik also was a teacher in Sárvár.

=== Károly Oreovecz ===
Károly Oreovecz was born in Kétvölgy.
