= Szentgotthárd District =

Szentgotthárd District Szentgotthárdi járás
- District
- Coat of arms

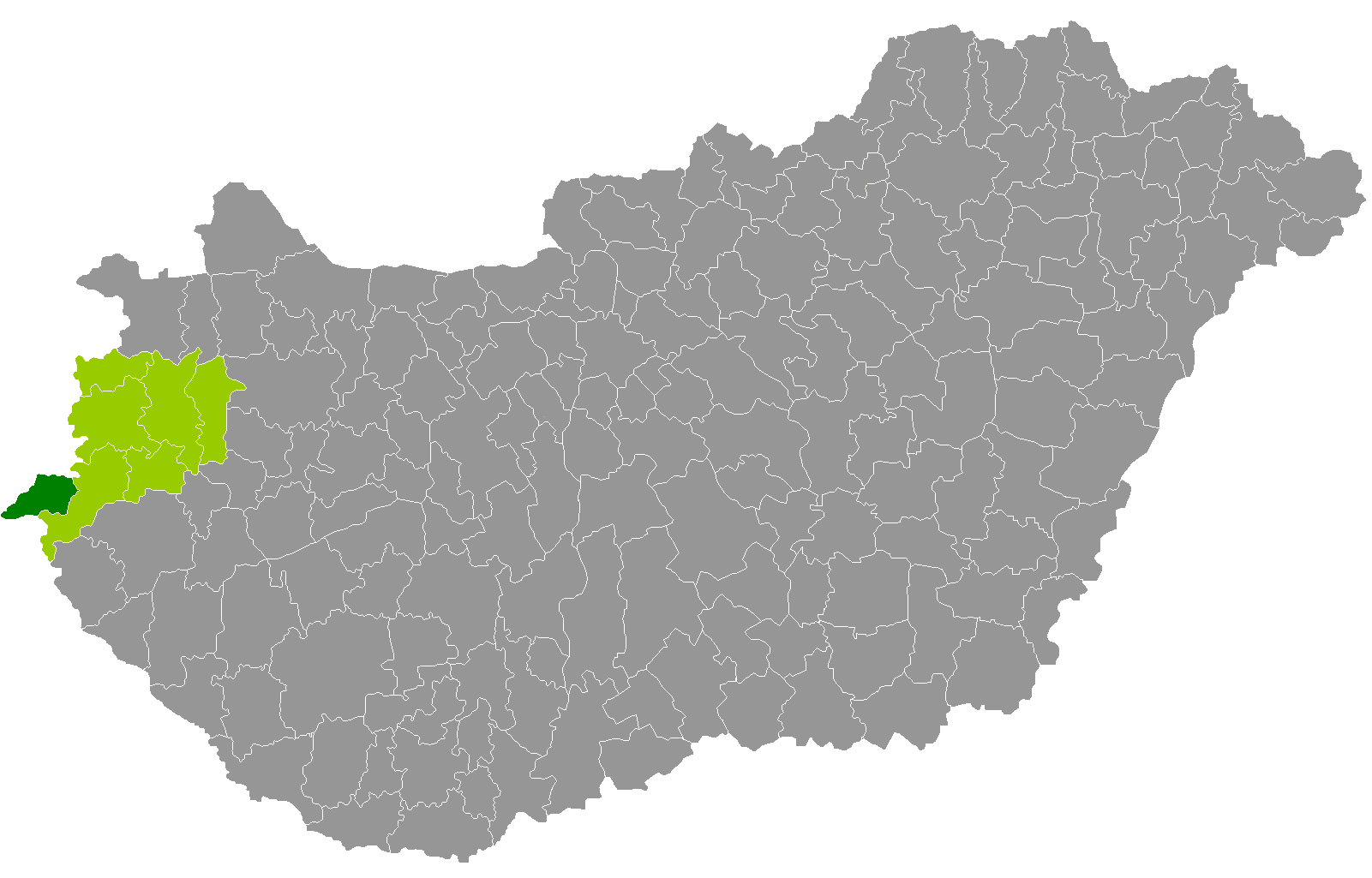
- Szentgotthárd District within Hungary and Vas County.
- Coordinates: 46.95°N 16.28°E
- Country: Hungary
- Region: Western Transdanubia
- County: Vas
- District seat: Szentgotthárd

Area
  - Total: 255.04 km^{2} (98.47 sq mi)
  - Rank: 7th in Vas

Population (2011 census)
  - Total: 14,961
  - Rank: 6th in Vas
  - Density: 59/km^{2} (150/sq mi)

Szentgotthárd (Hungarian: Szentgotthárdi járás; Slovene: Monošter okrožje) is a district in south-western part of Vas County. Szentgotthárd is also the name of the town where the district seat is found. The district is located in the Western Transdanubia Statistical Region.

== Geography ==
The Szentgotthárd District borders the Austrian state of Burgenland to the north and west, the Körmend District to the east, and Slovenia to the south.

== Municipalities ==
The district consists of 16 municipalities, 1 town and 15 villages. The seat of the district is highlighted in bold:

Municipality	Coat of arms	German name	Slovene name	Type	Area km^{2}	Population 2011 census
Alsószölnök		Unterzemming	Dolnji Senik	Village	10.02	244
Apátistvánfalva		Stephansdorf	Števanovci	Village	12.86	379
Csörötnek		Schriedling	Čretnik	Village	20.53	947
Felsőszölnök		Oberzemming	Gornji Senik	Village	23.56	592
Gasztony		Gasting	-	Village	34.13	443
Kétvölgy		Permisch und Riegersdorf	Verica-Ritkarovci	Village	6.28	110
Kondorfa		Kradendorf	Kradanovci	Village	21.61	526
Magyarlak		Ungarisch-Minihof	Lak	Village	7.62	777
Nemesmedves		Ginisdorf	-	Village	4.74	19
Orfalu		Andelsdorf	Andovci	Village	6.94	68
Rábagyarmat		Rupprecht	Žormot	Village	16.79	822
Rátót		Neustift an der Raab	-	Village	7.27	244
Rönök		Radling	Renik	Village	10.02	424
Szakonyfalu		Eckersdorf	Sakalovci	Village	11.19	364
**Szentgotthárd**		**Sankt Gotthard**	**Monošter**	**Town**	**67.73**	**8,629**
Vasszentmihály		Sankt Michael an der Raab	-	Village	6.41	345

== Demographics ==
Religion in Szentgotthárd District (2011 census)
1. Catholic Church (70.0%)
2. Greek Catholicism (0.10%)
3. Calvinism (2.50%)
4. Lutheranism (1.40%)
5. Orthodoxy (0.10%)
6. Other religions (0.50%)
7. Non-religious (4.10%)
8. Atheists (0.60%)
9. Undeclared (20.7%)

In 2011, it had a population of 14,961 and the population density was 59/km².

Year	County population	Change
2011	14,961	n/a

=== Ethnicity ===
Besides the Hungarian majority, the main minorities are the Slovene (approx. 1,700), German (650) and Roma (350).

Total population (2011 census): 14,961
Ethnic groups (2011 census): Identified themselves: 15,706 persons:

- Hungarians: 12,956 (82.49%)
- Slovenes: 1,656 (10.54%)
- Germans: 652 (4.15%)
- Gypsies: 331 (2.11%)
- Others and indefinable: 111 (0.71%)

Approx. 1,000 persons in Szentgotthárd District did declare more than one ethnic group at the 2011 census.

=== Religion ===
Religious adherence in the county according to 2011 census:

- Catholic – 10,487 (Roman Catholic – 10,474; Greek Catholic – 13);
- Reformed – 380;
- Evangelical – 202;
- Orthodox – 13;
- other religions – 77;
- Non-religious – 621;
- Atheism – 87;
- Undeclared – 3,094.

== See also ==
- List of cities and towns in Hungary
