= Terézia Zakoucs =

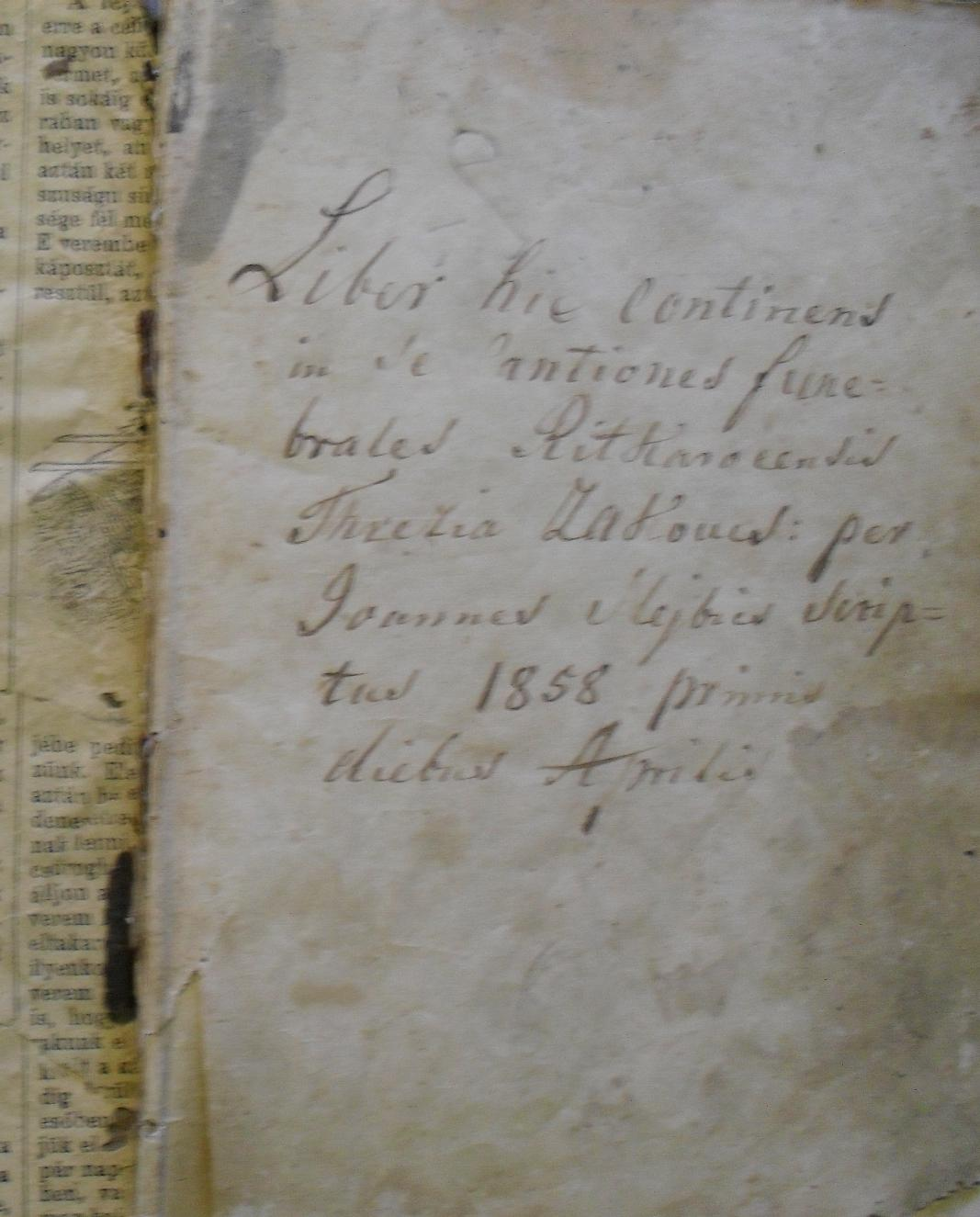
Zakoucs's hymnal, privately owned today in Kétvölgy.

Terézia Zakoucs (born Terézia Mukics, Slovene: Terezija Zakouč) (c. 1817 – April 25, 1885) was a Hungarian Slovene author.

She was born in Felsőszölnök. She married György Zakoucs. In 1858 she completed her hymnal in the Prekmurje Slovene Cantiones Ritkarócziensis. The book contains a number of hymns adapted from the hymnal of János Slejbics in Čepinci.

She died in Ritkarócz (Kétvölgy).

== Literature ==
- Vilko Novak: Prekmurske rokopisne pesmarice, Jezik in slovstvo 6/7, Slavistično društvo Slovenije 1974.

== See also ==
- List of Slovene writers and poets in Hungary
