= Károly Doncsecz =

Slovenian artist

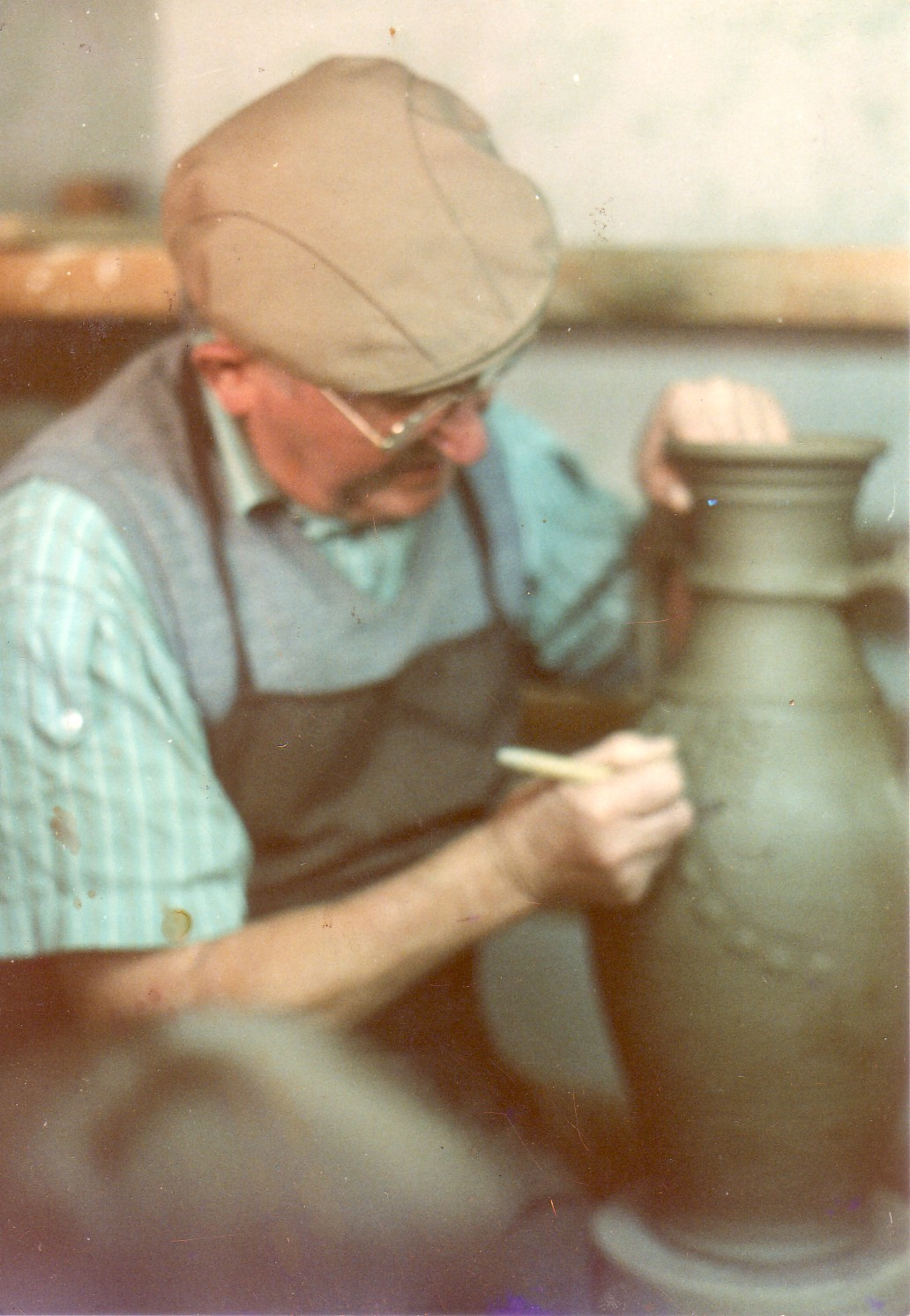
- Károly Doncsecz in 1987
- Born: c. 30 May 1918; Orfalu, Kingdom of Hungary
- Died: 15 November 2002 (aged 84); Körmend, Hungary
- Known for: Ceramics
- Awards: Master of Folk Art Award, 1984, Ágoston Pável Memorial plaquette, Congress VIII. of HNF Award, 1985, Order Vitéz 2001

Károly Doncsecz (Slovene: Karel Dončec, 30 May 1918 – 15 November 2002) was a Slovene master potter in Hungary and in 1984 he received the award "Master of folk art" for his work. Doncsecz was born in Orfalu, (Vas County).

He graduated from the apprenticeship in Magyarszombatfa and Zalaegerszeg, Sümeg (Zala County), after Szentgotthárd.

From 1940 on Doncsecz lived and worked in Kétvölgy, (Vas County). Since the 1970s, he was the only Slovene potter in Hungary. His potter works were presented in numerous exhibits all over Hungary and Slovenia. When he was still alive, travel groups from the motherland Slovenia often visited him in his kétvölgyian workshop, and Doncsecz did not only tell about his craft, but also about biographies of many Slovenes from the Rába region in his mother tongue.

== Early life ==
Károly Doncsecz was born in Orfalu. His parents were well off farmers of Slovenian origin. Both his father, Károly Dancsecz (1894–1927) and his mother, Anna Talabér (1900–1920) were born in Orfalu. He had a brother, István, who emigrated to and settled down in Canada in the 1960s (Steve Doncsecz died in 2008).

The brothers lost their parents very early. Their mother died while giving birth. Their father died seven years later of pulmonary disease. The brothers were raised by their grandfather, István Dancsecz (1871–1932) for a while.

When he was young, Károly worked for a turner in Orfalu. Originally he wanted to be a tailor but he got familiar with pottery in Apátistvánfalva at a potter called Károly Kürnyek who suggested to choose this trade. He went to Magyarszombatfa at the age of 15 in 1933. He was an apprentice of János Zsohár for 3 years and he studied the bases of the trade here. Later, most of his pieces of works showed a lot a similarity with the Magyarszombatfa style of pottery. The most difficult one was the Mowerjug (bugyogakorsó). From 1937 to 1938 he worked for Lajos Németh in Zalaegerszeg, then he went to István Adorján, a potter who lived Sümeg. He is thought to learn the patterns of the Great Plain here, and he was also influenced by Balázs Badár (1854–1939), a famous potter from Mezőtúr. During the years he collected ceramics from Vendvidék, Őrség, Transdanubia (Dunántúl) and the Great Plain, and he used them as samples. Later he displayed them on a shelf in his store with his first ceramics together.

In 1939 he lived in Szentgotthárd for a short while and he worked for János Kerécz, then he went back home to Orfalu and he married Anna Gáspár (1920–1984). They had 3 sons together. The youngest son, Károly Doncsecz jr. (1949–2005) became a potter too. However, he went to trade school he learned pottery mostly from his father.

He moved to Permise (later called Kétvölgy) after inheriting a house from his wife’s parents. The house used to be a pub before.

He was enlisted in 1942 and was sent to Kolozsvár (Cluj Napoca), but he was transported to Ukraine soon and he fought in the battles near Stanislaw (today Ivano-Frankivsk, Ukraine). In 1944 when their troops were withdrawing they were attacked by the British near Kolomea (today Kolomia, Ukraine) in Poland. He managed to escape, but he was soon captured by the Soviets and was deported to Czechoslovakia (now Czech Republic). He escaped and got through Slovakia but he was captured in Győr again. Luckily he was shortly released, so he could go back home.

Besides pottery he was farming too. He was a driver to Zala County and he was a regular vendor of the Őrségi Vásár (Őrségian Market) in Őriszentpéter.

He was an acknowledged potter of the Association of Hungarian South Slavics and later of the Association of Hungarian Slovenes. In 1984 he was given the prize of Master of Folk Art by Béla Köpeczi, the then minister of civilization.

He had a lot of visitors coming not only from all over the country, but also from abroad, mainly from Slovenia, although he also had some German and French visitors too. In 2001 he was given the Order of Vitéz for his military service. He never used this title though.

At the end of his life he was often ill, which jeopardized his work too. He died in the hospital in Körmend at the age of 84. With his death the pottery of Vendvidék vanished.

He was buried at Istvánfalvian Cemetery.

== Awards ==
- Live Exhibition of Folk art in Körmend Award, 1978.
- Handicraft Exhibition in Szentgotthárd charter, 1978.
- KIOSZ silver ring, 1978.
- KIOSZ charter, 1982.
- Master of Folk Art, 1984.
- Ágoston Pável Memorial plaquette
- Congress VIII. of HNF Award, 1985.
- To the Raba country honours, 1999.
- Order Vitéz 2001.
