= Magyarszombatfa =

Magyarszombatfa Soboška vas (in Slovene)
- Village
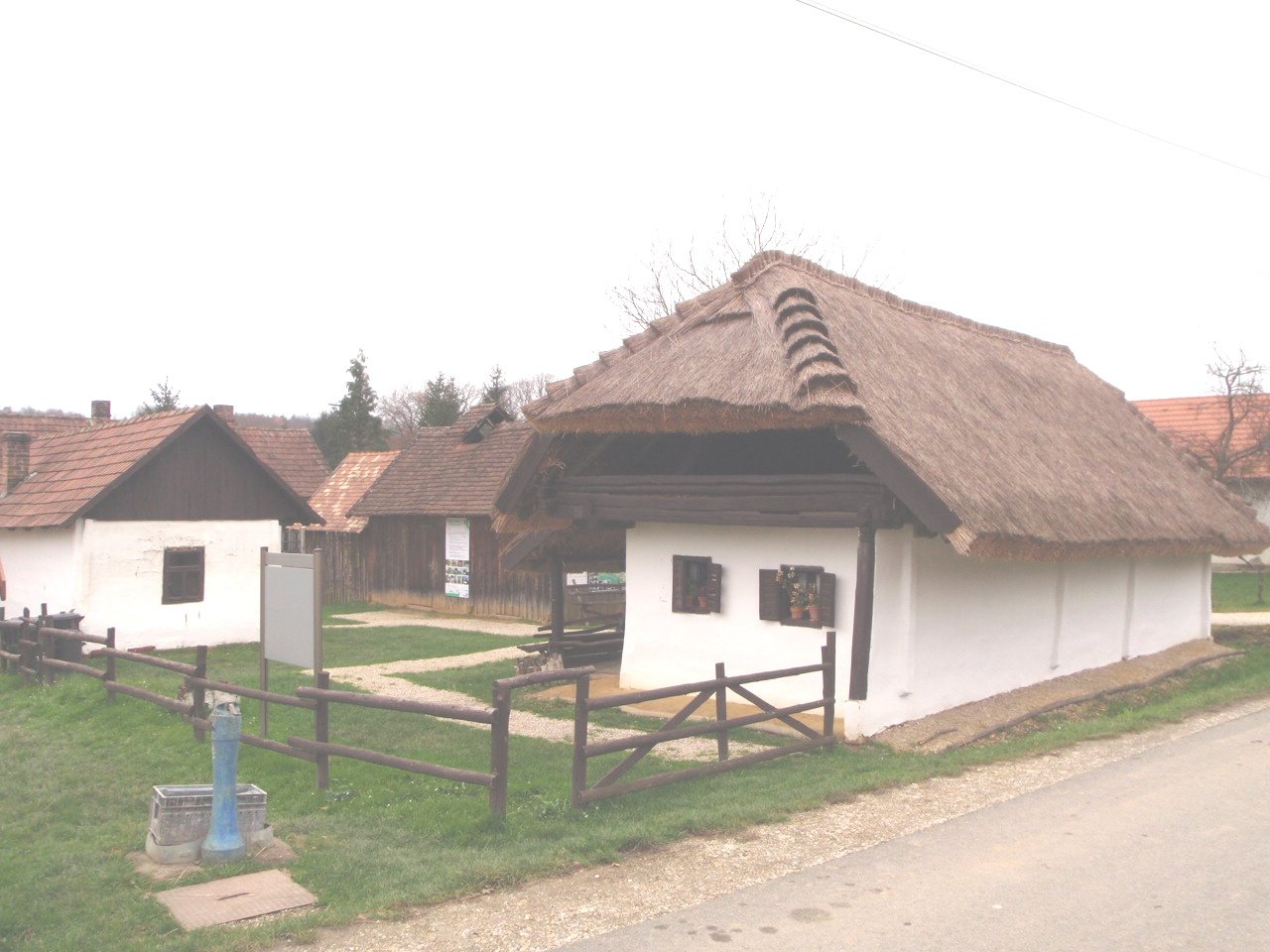
- Potter's house (Monument)

- Flag Coat of arms

- Location of Magyarszombatfa
- Coordinates: 46.76130°N 16.34287°E
- Country: Hungary
- Region: Western Transdanubia
- County: Vas
- District: Körmend

Area
  - Total: 15.94 km^{2} (6.15 sq mi)

Population (1 January 2026)
  - Total: 233
  - Density: 14.6/km^{2} (37.9/sq mi)
- Time zone: UTC+1 (CET)
  - Summer (DST): UTC+2 (CEST)
- Postal code: 9946
- Area code: (+36) 94

Magyarszombatfa (Slovene: Soboška vas) is a village in Vas county, Hungary. The Slovenian potter Károly Doncsecz studied here.
