= Mátyás Krajczár =

Slovenian writer

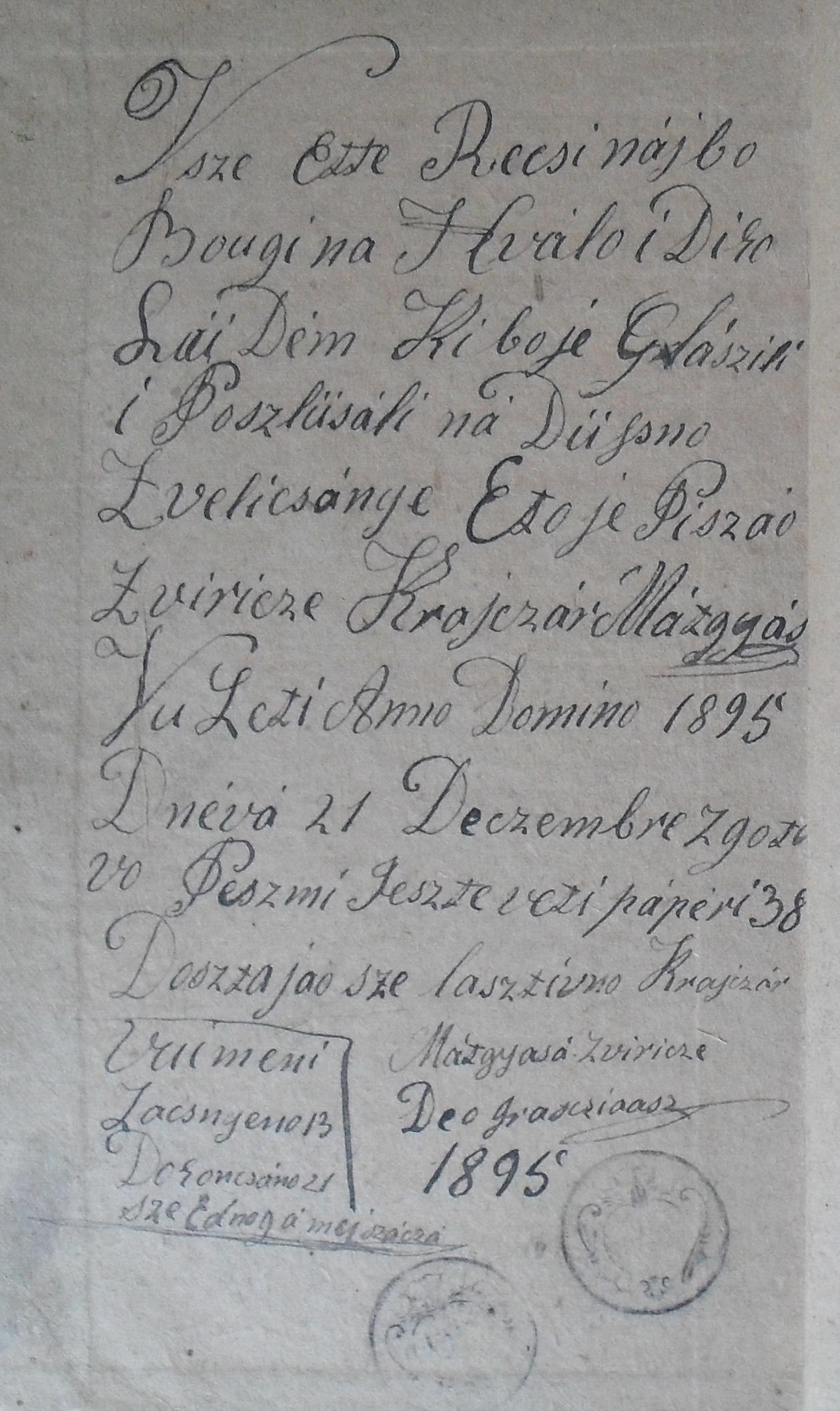
Krajczár's hymnal.

Mátyás Krajczár (Slovene: Matjaš Krajcar, 1876–1958) was a Hungarian Slovene writer in the village of Permise (Kétvölgy).

His parents were Slovene Roman Catholic peasants. In 1895 he wrote a manuscript hymnal with Prekmurje-dialect dirges. Many of the dirges were adapted from old hymnals, including from József Gosztony.

In the 1950s the communists deported Krajczár to Hortobágy. In 1956 he returned. In 1958 he died; his grave is in the Apátistvánfalva cemetery.

== See also ==
- List of Slovene writers and poets in Hungary

== Literature ==
- Vilko Novak: Prekmurske rokopisne pesmarice, Jezik in slovstvo 6/7, Slavistično društvo Slovenije 1974.
