= Rátót =

- Village and municipality
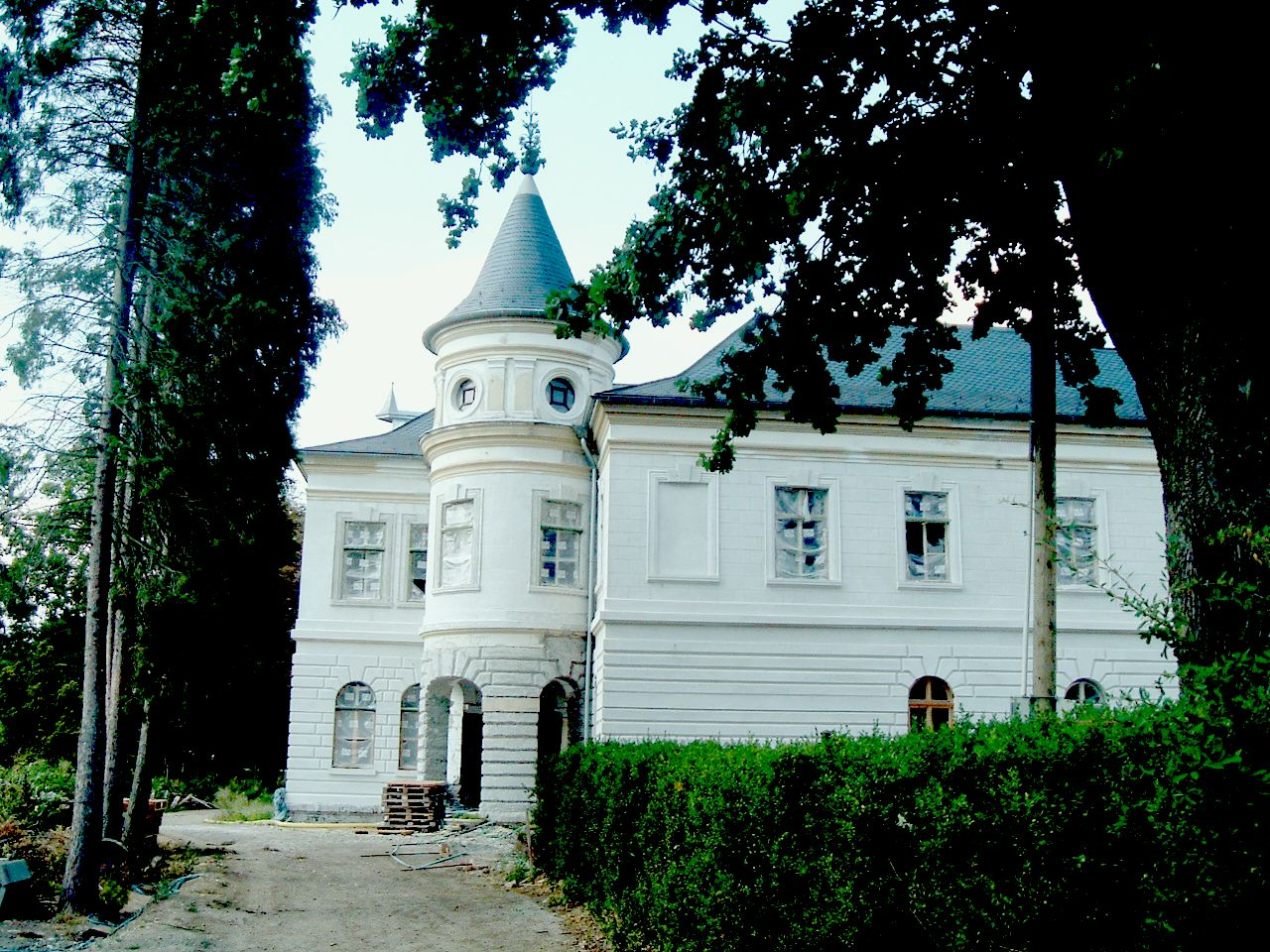

- Coat of arms

- Location of Rátót in Hungary
- Coordinates: 46°57′50″N 16°25′40″E
- Country: Hungary
- Region: Western Transdanubia
- County: Vas
- District: Szentgotthárd District

Area
  - Total: 7.27 km^{2} (2.81 sq mi)

Population (1 January 2008)
  - Total: 248
  - Density: 34.1/km^{2} (88.4/sq mi)
- Time zone: UTC+1 (CET)
  - Summer (DST): UTC+2 (CEST)
- Postal code: 9951
- Area code: +36 94
- KSH code: 23861
- Website: kh.ratot.hu

Rátót (German: Neustift an der Raab) is a village in Vas county, Hungary.

Kálmán Széll, the Prime Minister of Hungary between 1899 and 1903 died here in 1915.

== Twin cities ==
- Királyhelmec – Slovakia
- Sokobanja – Serbia
- Düsseldorf – Germany
- Alytus – Lithuania
