= István Pintér =

Hungarian-Slovene writer (1831–1875)

István Pintér (Slovene: Števan Pinter) (c. January 25, 1831 – December 11, 1875) was a Hungarian Slovene writer and courtier in Felsőszölnök.

He was born and lived in the Jánoshegy (locally: Janošovi brejg), near Felsőszölnök. His parents were István Pintér and Mária Bajzék.

In 1864, he wrote his cantor-book. This hymnal contains religious folk songs in the Prekmurje Slovene. The oldest hymn is Krisztus nam je od szmrti sztao (Christ Is Risen from the Dead) from the manuscript of Stična Monastery in Styria.

== Sources ==
- Marija Kozar/Kozár Mária: Etnološki slovar Slovencev na Madžarskem / A Magyarországi Szlovének néprajzi szótára, Monošter-Szombathely 1996. ISBN 963-7206-62-0
- Franci Just: Besede iz Porabja, besede za Porabja, Franc-Franc, Murska Sobota 2003. ISBN 961-219-070-4
