= Vasszécseny =

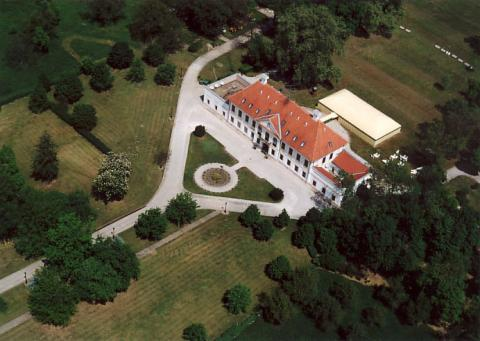

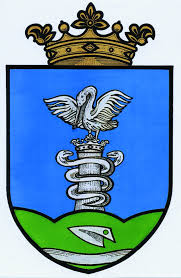
- Coat of arms

- Location of Vasszécseny in Hungary
- Coordinates: 47°10′58″N 16°45′58″E
- Country: Hungary
- Region: Western Transdanubia
- County: Vas
- Subregion: Szombathelyi
- Rank: Village

Area
  - Total: 17.95 km^{2} (6.93 sq mi)

Population (1 January 2008)
  - Total: 1,447
  - Density: 80.61/km^{2} (208.8/sq mi)
- Time zone: UTC+1 (CET)
  - Summer (DST): UTC+2 (CEST)
- Postal code: 9763
- Area code: +36 94
- KSH code: 29373
- Website: www.vasszecseny.hu

Vasszécseny is a village in Vas county, Hungary.
