= Orfalu =

Orfalu Andovci
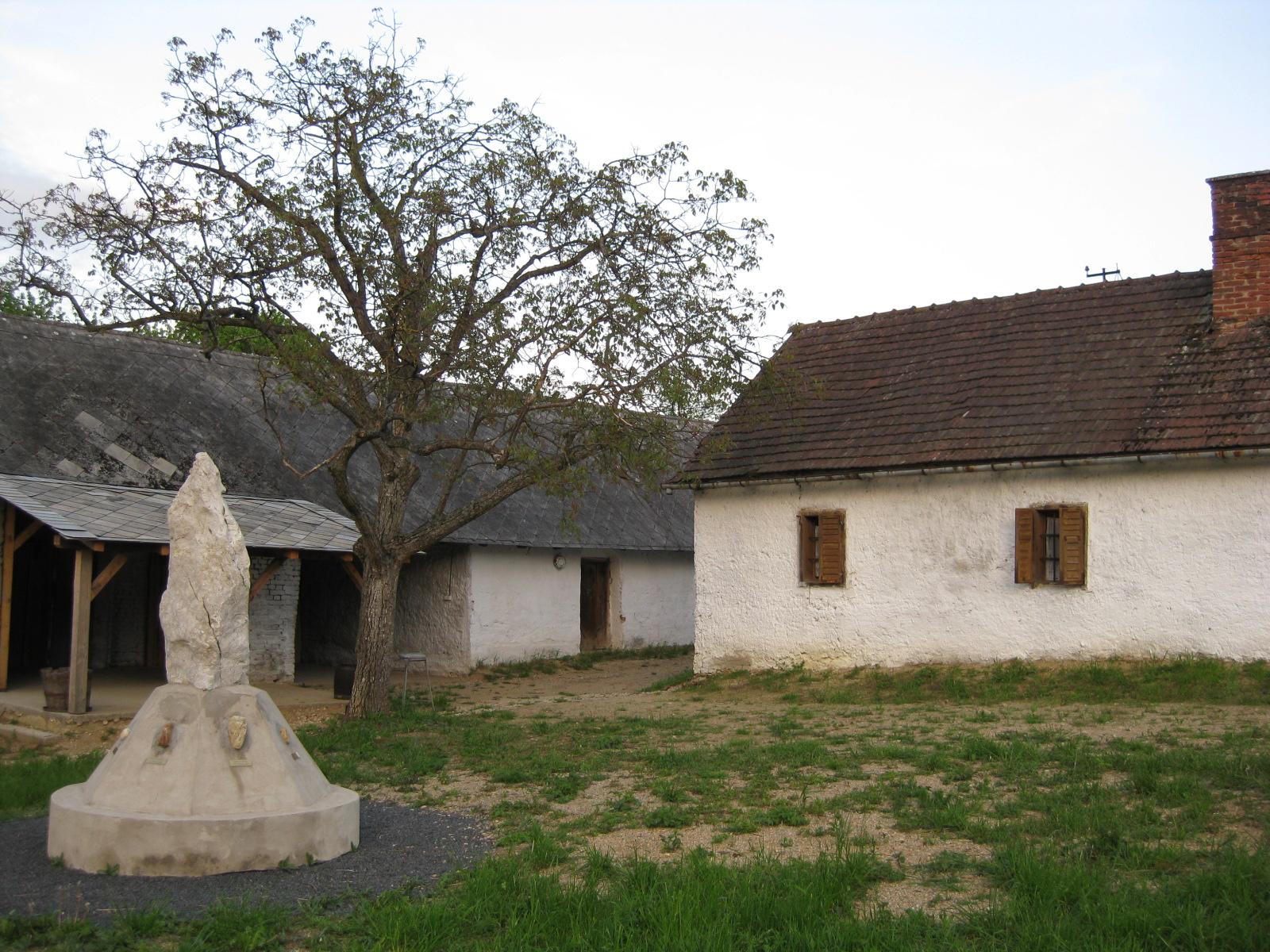
- Monument in Orfalu to the Slovene culture in Hungary, made from a rock from Mount Triglav

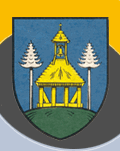
- Coat of arms
- Interactive map of Orfalu
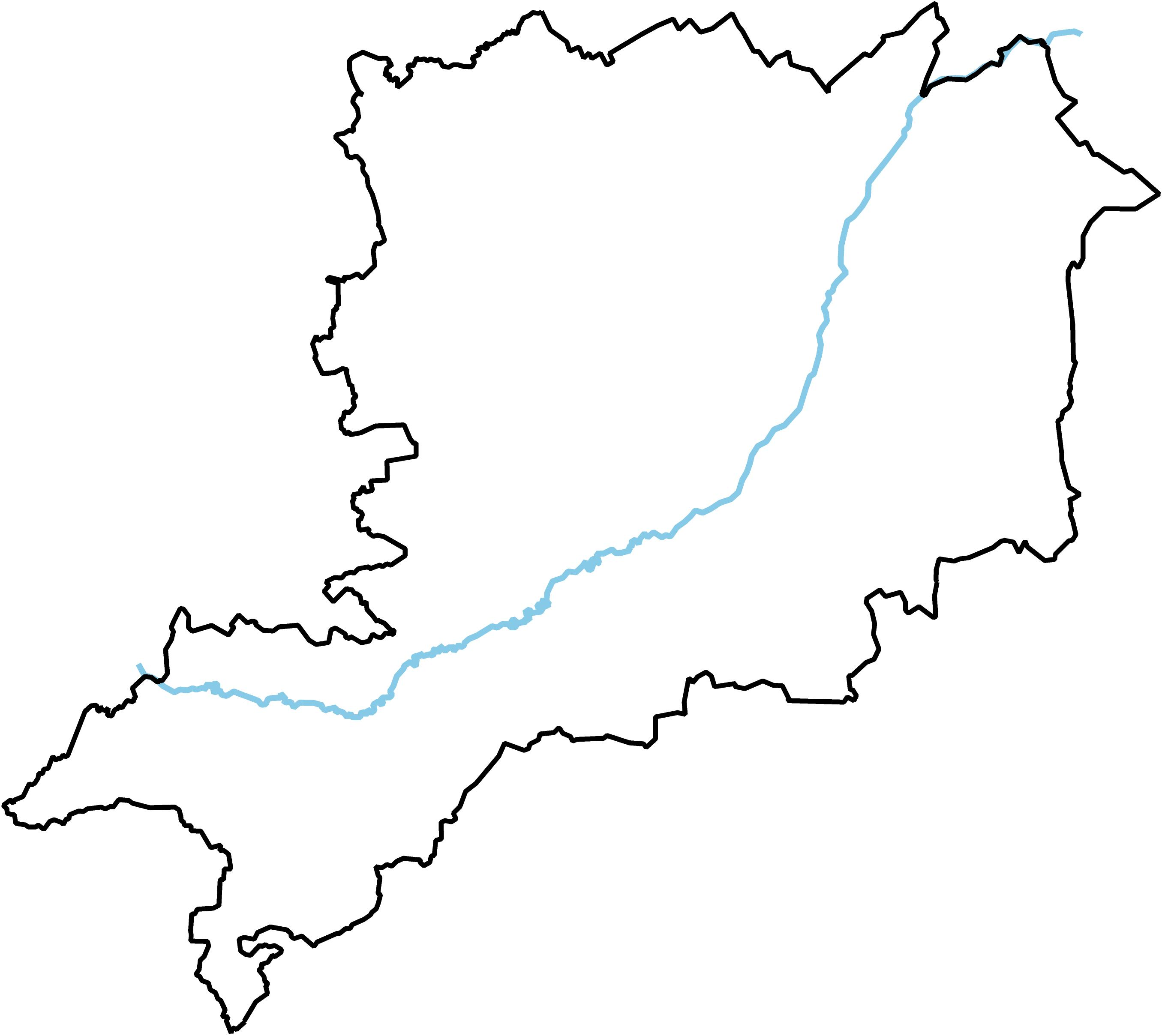
- Location of Orfalu Orfalu (Hungary)
- Coordinates: 46.87647°N 16.26616°E
- Country: Hungary
- Region: Western Transdanubia
- County: Vas
- District: Szentgotthárd

Area
  - Total: 6.94 km^{2} (2.68 sq mi)

Population (2015)
  - Total: 71
  - Density: 8.64/km^{2} (22.4/sq mi)
- Time zone: UTC+1 (CET)
  - Summer (DST): UTC+2 (CEST)
- Postal code: 9982
- Area code: 94

Orfalu (Slovene: Andovci, German: Andelsdorf) is a village in the District of Szentgotthárd, Vas county, Hungary. In 2019, a 1.29 km bicycle path was completed, connecting Orfalu and Budinci, Slovenia.

== Notable people ==
Notable people that were born or lived in Orfalu include:

- Károly Doncsecz, Slovenian master potter
