= Kétvölgy =

- Location of Vas county in Hungary

- Location of Kétvölgy
- Coordinates: 46.88227°N 16.22321°E
- Country: Hungary
- County: Vas

Area
  - Total: 6.28 km^{2} (2.42 sq mi)

Population (2015)
  - Total: 97
  - Density: 20.85/km^{2} (54.0/sq mi)
- Time zone: UTC+1 (CET)
  - Summer (DST): UTC+2 (CEST)
- Postal code: 9982
- Area code: 94

Kétvölgy (Slovene: Verica-Ritkarovci, German: Permisch und Riegersdorf) is a village in Vas county, Hungary. Lived and worked in Kétvölgy Károly Doncsecz potter, Master of folk art. The village is one of the localities where Slovenes live.

== See also ==
- Terézia Zakoucs
- Mátyás Krajczár
