= Szakonyfalu =

- Location of Vas County in Hungary

- Location of Szakonyfalu
- Coordinates: 46.92465°N 16.23056°E
- Country: Hungary
- County: Vas

Area
  - Total: 11.19 km^{2} (4.32 sq mi)

Population (2015)
  - Total: 351
  - Density: 32.26/km^{2} (83.6/sq mi)
- Time zone: UTC+1 (CET)
  - Summer (DST): UTC+2 (CEST)
- Postal code: 9983
- Area code: 94

Szakonyfalu (Slovene: Sakalovci) is a village in Vas County, Hungary.
