= Felsőszölnök =

Felsőszölnök Gornji Senik · Oberzemming
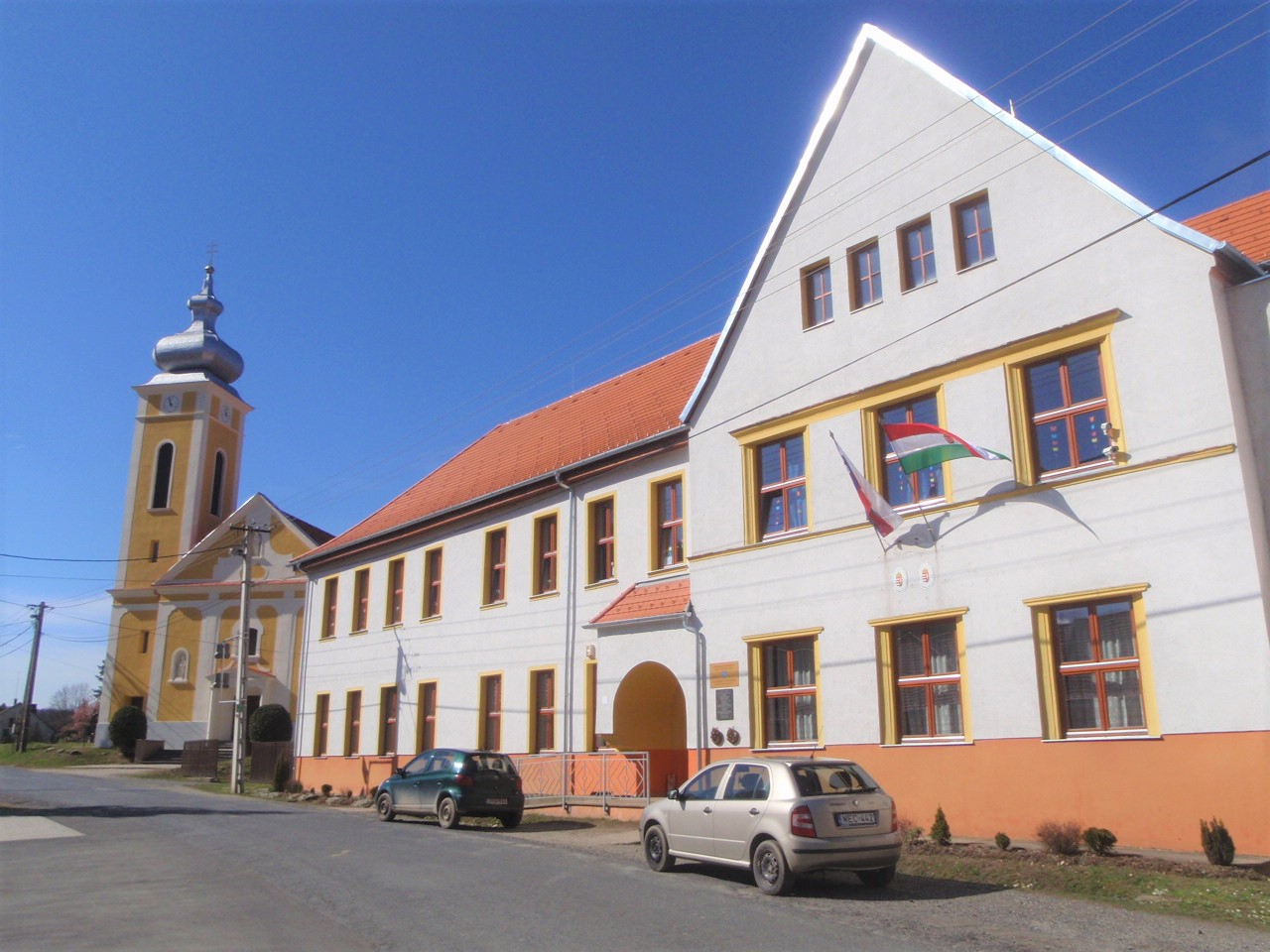

- Flag Coat of arms
- Interactive map of Felsőszölnök
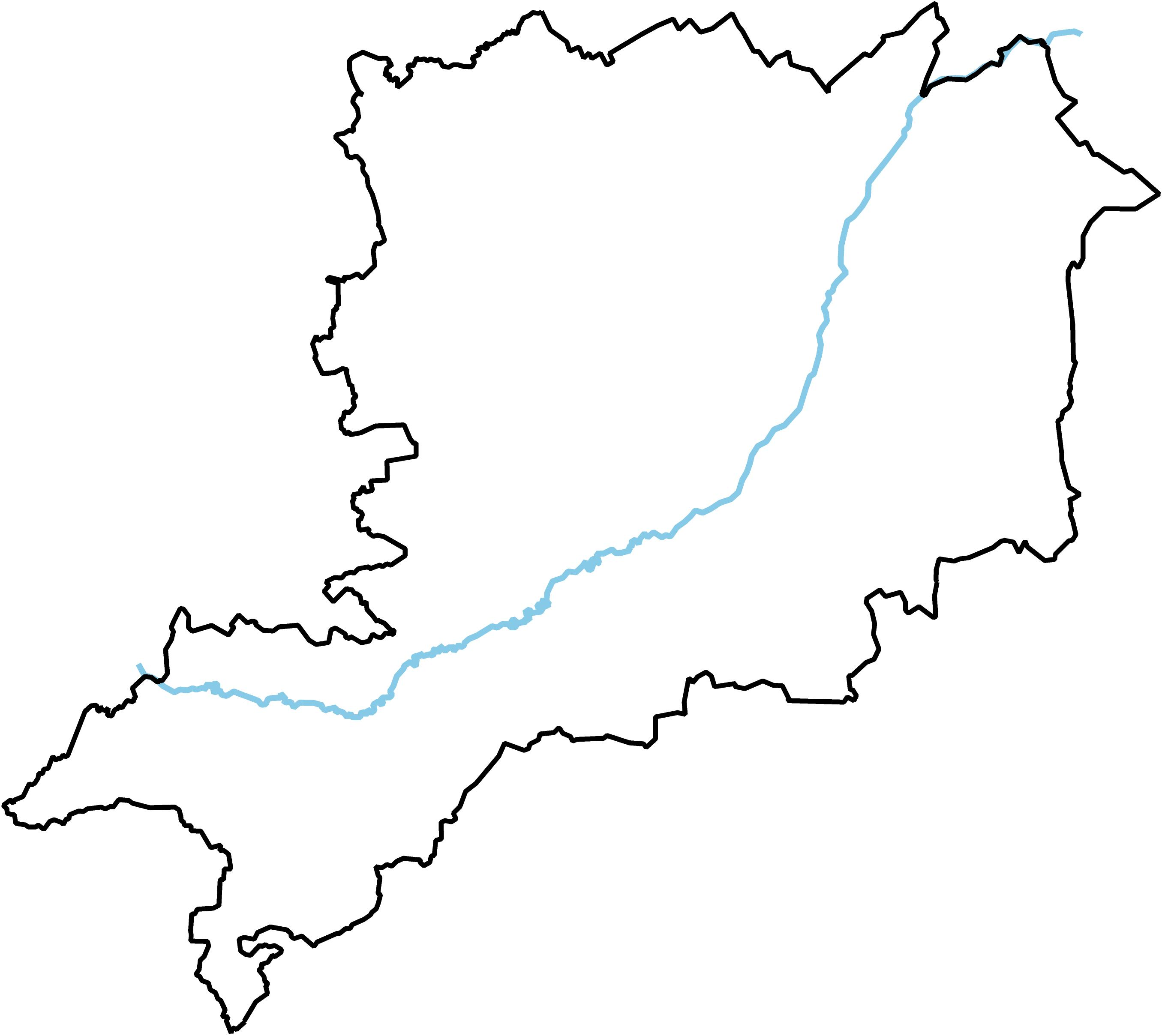
- Location of Felsőszölnök Felsőszölnök (Hungary)
- Coordinates: 46.87059°N 16.15973°E
- Country: Hungary
- Region: Western Transdanubia
- County: Vas
- District: Szentgotthárd

Area
  - Total: 23.56 km^{2} (9.10 sq mi)

Population (2015)
  - Total: 584
  - Density: 24.8/km^{2} (64.2/sq mi)
- Time zone: UTC+1 (CET)
  - Summer (DST): UTC+2 (CEST)
- Postal code: 9985
- Area code: 94

Felsőszölnök (Slovene: Gornji Senik, German: Oberzemming. Latin: Zelnuk Superior) is a village in Vas County, Hungary. It is the westernmost point of Hungary, and lies on the borders with Slovenia and Austria. It is closer to the capitals of four countries (Slovenia, Croatia, Austria, and Slovakia) than it is to Budapest, its own country.

== Location ==
The nearest settlements are Oberdrosen in Jennersdorf, Burgenland to the northwest, and Neradnovci in the Municipality of Gornji Petrovci, Slovenia to the south.

== Culture ==
The Alliance of Hungarian Slovenes has its seat in Felsőszölnök, there is a preschool with education in Slovene, and Slovene is taught in the primary school.

The Martinje-Felsőszölnök border crossing between Hungary and Slovenia was opened in 1992, resulting in more frequent contacts between the districts in the neighbouring countries.

== Twin cities ==
- Kuzma, Slovenia
- Sankt Martin an der Raab, Austria

== People ==
- József Kossics died in Felsőszölnök.
- István Pintér
